= Edward L. Toppins =

American Tuskegee Airman fighter pilot (1915–1946)

Edward Toppins
- Born: Edward Lucien Toppins; June 12, 1915; Mississippi, US
- Died: December 10, 1946 (aged 31); Lockbourne, Ohio, US
- Cause of death: B-25 Bomber Crash
- Resting place: Golden Gate National Cemetery
- Education: Los Angeles Junior College, University of San Francisco
- Occupations: Military officer; fighter pilot
- Years active: 1942-1946

Edward Lucien Toppins (June 12, 1915 – December 10, 1946) was a U.S. Army Air Force officer, commanding officer of the 602nd Air Engineering Squadron, and a celebrated African-American World War II fighter pilot within the 332nd Fighter Group's 99th Fighter Squadron, best known as the Tuskegee Airmen, "Red Tails," or “Schwartze Vogelmenschen” ("Black Birdmen") among enemy German pilots. He was one of 1,007 documented Tuskegee Airmen Pilots.

Toppins is considered one of the best pilots to have emerged from the Tuskegee program. He earned the Distinguished Flying Cross, the Air Medal with 5 clusters, a Victory Medal, an Eastern Theater Offensive Ribbon with 7 battle stars, and an American Defense recognition. Known among by his peers as a "pilot's pilot" and "almost a daredevil," Toppins completed 141 missions, destroying four enemy aircraft with one probable. Toppins, "Buddy" Lee Archer, and Joseph Elsberry each destroyed four enemy aircraft during World War II aerial missions in Europe. None of these Tuskegee Airmen were officially credited with the coveted fifth “kill” which would place a fighter pilot in the “ace” category.

== Early life, education, family ==
Toppins was born in Mississippi on June 12, 1915, to Martha E. Toppins Davis, a dressmaker. He was the only brother of three sisters: Henrietta Toppins Whitby, Delphine, and Naomi. After living in Louisiana in the 1930s, Toppins moved with his mother and sisters to Los Angeles, California where Martha worked as a maid to a wealthy family.

After graduating from Los Angeles Junior College, Toppins enrolled at the University of San Francisco while also working as a Greyhound Bus Company porter. At the University of San Francisco, Toppins took five courses in civilian pilot training, and obtained both his commercial pilot’s license and instructor’s rating. Though it was difficult for an African American to get into the course, Toppins considered his pre-war pilot’s training a feather in his cap. "Once in," he remarked, "there was not trouble at all."

After World War II, Toppins married Lucille, the widow of fellow Tuskegee Airman Sidney Brooks. Toppins died in an aircraft crash in Ohio six months after marrying Lucille.

== Military career ==
Interested in a career as a pilot, he joined the military on October 16, 1940. He applied and was admitted into the Tuskegee Army Air Field Training Program. Despite incurring injuries during a training crash, Toppins recovered and, on September 6, 1942, he graduated as a member of the Tuskegee Army Air Field Training Program's Class 42-H.

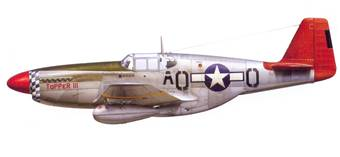
A P-51B/C marked at Toppin's Topper III, August 1944

Toppins was considered one of the best pilots to have completed the Tuskegee program. Known among by his peers as a "pilot's pilot" and "almost a daredevil," Toppins completed 141 missions, shooting down four enemy aircraft with one probable victory.

Toppins was one of three Tuskegee Airmen who came close to earning the US Military's designation of fighter ace. His tours included Germany, Czechoslovakia, Romania, Pantelleria, Sicily, Italy, Bulgaria, Southern France, Austria, Greece, Poland, and Yugoslavia.

Toppins and fellow Red Tail Leonard M. Jackson earned the Distinguished Flying Cross for heroic actions on June 4, 1944, pursuant to a Fifteenth Air Force General Order 4041 -dated October 19, 1944, and a Fifteenth Air Force General Order 4876 - dated 5 Dec 5, 1944.

On July 26, 1944, Toppins, now a Captain, destroyed an enemy Messerschmitt Bf 109 aircraft while his squadron escorted the 47th Bombardment Wing on a bombing mission against the Markersdorf airdrome in Austria. This event marked Toppins' fourth kill, giving him more kills than any other Red Tail pilot at that time.

After returning from the United States from Europe, Toppins became the commanding officer of the 602nd Air Engineering Squadron or the 580th Air Services Group at Ohio's Lockbourne Army Air Base.

Overall, Toppins was one of only nine 332nd Fighter Group pilots with at least three confirmed kills during World War II.

== Death in B-25 bomber crash ==
During a routine instrument training exercise on December 10, 1946, Toppins piloted a North American B-25 Mitchell bomber with co-pilot Captain Chase Brenzier, Jr., Lt. Ralph Berkes, and Staff Sergeant John Smith. Mid-flight, the bomber crashed and exploded over 25 acres of land near Lockbourne Army Air Base, killing all four men.

Toppins is interred in Section G Site 2191-B at the Golden Gate National Cemetery, San Bruno, California.

== Awards ==
- Distinguished Flying Cross
- Air Medal with 5 clusters
- Victory Medal, an Eastern Theater Offensive Ribbon with 7 battle stars
- Eastern Theater Offensive Ribbon with 7 battle stars
- American Defense recognition.

== Legacy ==
- Toppins' letters, awards and journals sit in the California African American Museum’s special collection.
- Likely in response to Toppins' death in 1946, Toppins' widow, Lucille, was made an honorary member of the Lockbourne Officers' Wives Club.
- "Captain Edward Toppins Ct" in the predominantly African American town of Fort Washington, Maryland in Prince George's County is named for Toppins.

== See also ==
- List of Tuskegee Airmen Cadet Pilot Graduation Classes
- List of Tuskegee Airmen
- Military history of African Americans
- Dogfights (TV series)
- Executive Order 9981
- The Tuskegee Airmen (movie)
