= Joseph Elsberry =

American fighter pilot (1921–1985)

- Born: Joseph Dubois Elsberry; April 25, 1921; Langston, Oklahoma, US
- Died: March 31, 1985 (aged 63); Los Angeles, California, US
- Resting place: Arlington National Cemetery
- Education: Langston University
- Occupations: Military officer; fighter pilot; retired as Major
- Years active: 1942-1962

Joseph D. Elsberry (April 25, 1921 – March 31, 1985) was a U.S. Army Air Force officer and a prolific African-American World War II fighter pilot in the 332nd Fighter Group's 301st Fighter Squadron, best known as the famed Tuskegee Airmen, "Red Tails," or “Schwartze Vogelmenschen” ("Black Birdmen") among enemy German pilots. Elsberry destroyed three enemy aircraft over France in a single mission on July 12, 1944, and a fourth aircraft on July 20, 1944, becoming the first African American fighter pilot in history to do so. He is only one of four Tuskegee Airmen to have earned three aerial victories in a single day of combat: Clarence Lester, Lee Archer (pilot), and Harry Stewart.

Elsberry was one of the first African-American military aviators in the United States Army Air Corps, the United States Army Air Forces and later the U.S. Air Force, eventually earning the rank of major before retiring in 1962.

Elsberry was one of three Tuskegee Airmen to have come close to achieving the US Military's designation of flying ace. Elsberry, Lee Archer and Edward L. Toppins each destroyed four enemy aircraft during missions in Europe. None of these Tuskegee Airmen ever received a fifth “kill” which would have placed them in the “ace” category. However, despite some contention, Lee Archer is considered by some as the first and only African American U.S. pilot in World War II to earn an "ace" designation.

On September 10, 1944, brigadier general Benjamin Davis Sr., the first African American to receive the rank of general and the father of Tuskegee Airmen commander Benjamin O. Davis Jr., awarded Elsberry the prestigious Distinguished Flying Cross. Elsberry received this award for single acts of heroism or extraordinary achievement while participating in aerial flights on July 12, 1944, and July 20, 1944. Several major military leaders attended the ceremony including Ira C. Eaker, Commanding General of the Mediterranean Allied Air Forces, Nathan F. Twining, Commanding General of the 15th Air Force, and Dean C. Strother, Commanding General of the 306th Fighter Wing of the 15th Air Force.

== Early life and family ==
Born Joseph Dubois Elsberry in Langston, Oklahoma. Elsberry was the youngest child and only son of Joseph Dean Elsberry (1890–1930), a school teacher and civic leader, and Beulah Earle Meeks Elsberry (1894–1969), a school teacher. He was the younger brother of Beulah O'Dyne Elsberry Irons (1916–1984), an accomplished pianist and organist, and finish tailor.

Prior to joining the military, Elsberry attended Langston University for three years.

Elsberry is considered Langston's most famous resident for his heroics in World War II.

== Military career, fame as Tuskegee Airmen fighter pilot ==
Elsberry enlisted in the US Army in Oklahoma City, Oklahoma on 19 Feb 1942, receiving Army Serial Number 18086103

Prior to 1942, African Americans were not permitted to become fighter pilots because of rampant racial discrimination in the U.S. armed services. As the United States ramped up its involvement in World War II, the U.S. military experienced a severe shortage of skilled, experienced pilots. African American newspapers and civil rights leaders including the NAACP's Walter White, Judge William H. Hastie, and Pullman Porter union leader A. Philip Randolph pleaded with President Franklin Roosevelt to include African American in aeronautics and the United States Army Air Corps, the U.S. Army Corps. In response, the U.S. military created an 'experimental' aviator training program for African Americans. Some of the way was paved by U.S. Congress' April 3, 1939 Appropriations Bill Public Law 18 which designated funds to train African-American pilots at civilian flight schools.

This program, initiated in June 1941, began at Tuskegee, Alabama at the Tuskegee Army Airfield near Tuskegee Institute (now Tuskegee University).

Elsberry became one of the most famous graduates of Tuskegee Army Flying School, graduating with Class 42-H-SE on September 6, 1942. As a member of the all-African American 332nd Fighter Group, Elsberry as a fighter pilot graduated from the Tuskegee Army Flying School.

As a captain, Elsberry led the 301st Fighter Squadron. On 23 June 1944, Elsberry and his squadron of P-51 “Mustang” long-range, single-seat fighters sank a German destroyer in Italy's Trieste Harbor employing exclusively 50-caliber machine guns. Though the German military denied destruction of its destroyer at the hands of US fighter pilots, film confirmed the successful attack.

On 12 July 1944, Elsberry, while escorting bombers with his squadron in southern Italy, shot down three German Focke-Wulf Fw 190s in a single day.

On 20 July 1944, Elsberry destroyed an enemy Messerschmitt 109 aircraft on his accomplishments were tantamount to those of an “ace” fighter pilot. His 4 kills came very close to meeting the designation for an ace. Elsberry joined fellow Tuskegee Airmen Edward L. Toppins and Lee Archer to each destroy four enemy aircraft.

A prolific member of the Tuskegee Airmen, Elsberry was one of only nine 332nd Fighter Group pilots with at least three confirmed kills during World War II:

- Joseph Elsberry - 332nd Fighter Group's 301st Fighter Squadron - 4 Confirmed Kills, 1 Possible
- Edward L. Toppins - 332nd Fighter Group's 99th Fighter Squadron - 4 Confirmed Kills, 1 Possible
- Lee Archer - 332nd Fighter Group's 302nd Fighter Squadron - 4 Confirmed Kills
- Charles B. Hall - 332nd Fighter Group's 99th Fighter Squadron - 3 confirmed kills
- Leonard M. Jackson - 332nd Fighter Group's 99th Fighter Squadron - 3 Confirmed Kills
- Clarence D. Lester - 332nd Fighter Group's 100th Fighter Squadron - 3 Confirmed Kills
- Wendell O. Pruitt - 332nd Fighter Group's 302nd Fighter Squadron - 3 Confirmed Kills
- Roger Romine - 332nd Fighter Group's 302nd Fighter Squadron - 3 Confirmed Kill, 1 Unconfirmed
- Harry Stewart, Jr. - 332nd Fighter Group's 301st Fighter Squadron - 3 Confirmed Kills

He is only one of four Tuskegee Airmen to have earned three aerial victories in a single day of combat: Clarence Lester, Lee Archer and Harry Stewart.

Elsberry retired in 1962 with the rank of major.

== Later life and death ==
After returning to Oklahoma, Elsberry relocated to San Francisco in 1962, working for Western Electric Company until his final retirement in 1977.

On 31 March 1985, Elsberry had a heart attack and died in his San Francisco, California apartment. He was interred at Arlington National Cemetery in Section 42, Grave 2804.

== See also ==
- Tuskegee Airmen
- List of Tuskegee Airmen Cadet Pilot Graduation Classes
- List of Tuskegee Airmen
- Military history of African Americans
- Dogfights (TV series)
- Executive Order 9981
- The Tuskegee Airmen (movie)
