= Andrew D. Turner =

American military officer and fighter pilot

2nd lieutenantf Andrew D. Turner
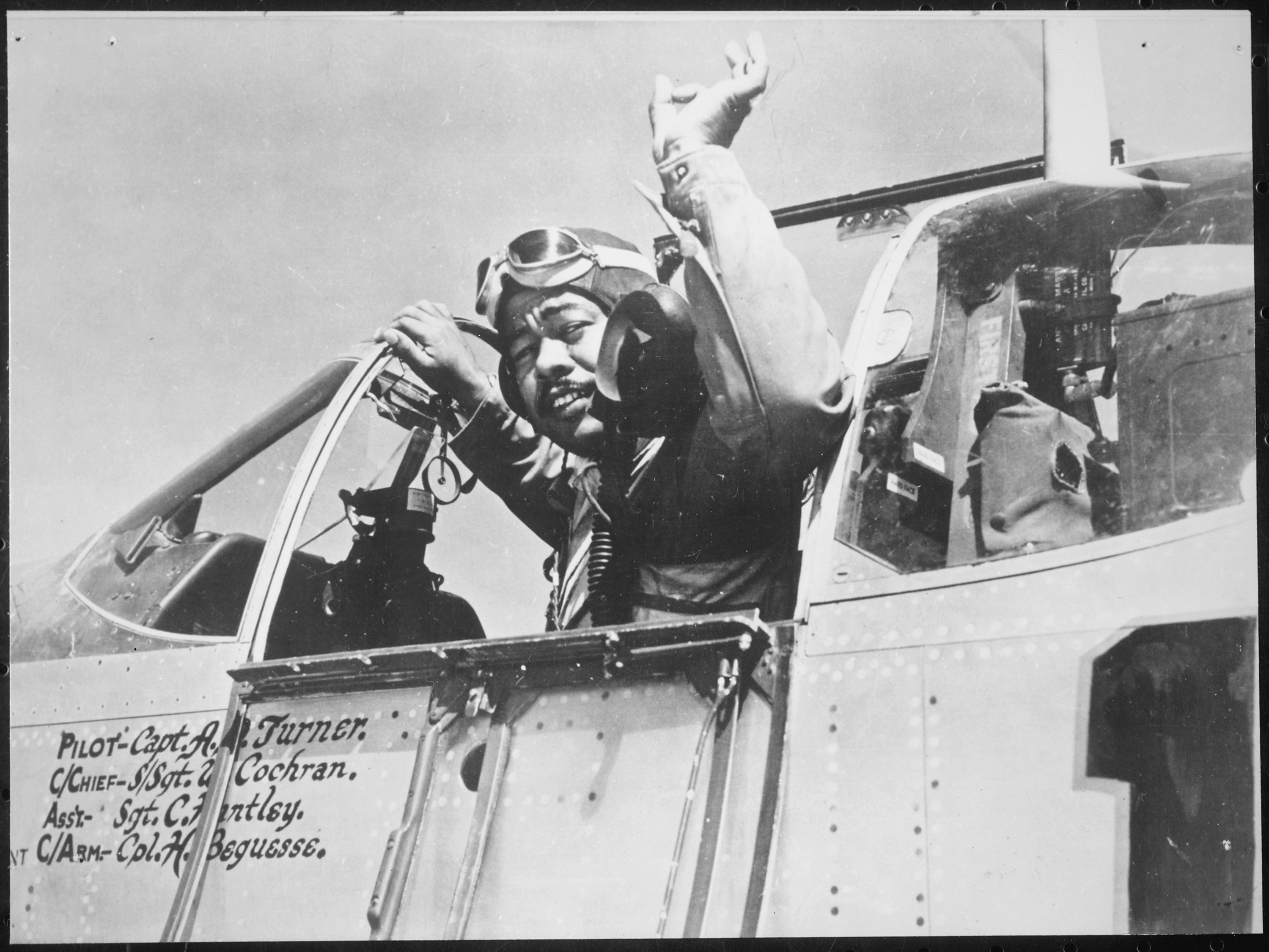
- Turner in September 1944
- Born: January 6, 1920; Washington D.C.
- Died: September 14, 1947 (aged 27); Lockbourne Army Airfield
- Burial place: Arlington National Cemetery
- Military career
- Allegiance: United States of America
- Branch: United States Army Air Forces
- Service years: 1942-1947
- Rank: 2nd lieutenant
- Nickname: Jugs
- Commands: 100th Fighter Squadron
- Conflicts: World War II
- Awards: Air Medal; Congressional Gold Medal awarded to Tuskegee Airmen; Distinguished Flying Cross

Andrew D. Turner (6 January 1920 – 14 September 1947) was an officer in the U.S. Army Air Forces (USAAF) and a fighter pilot and commanding officer of the all-African American 332nd Fighter Group's 100th Fighter Squadron, best known as the all-African American Tuskegee Airmen, "Red Tails," or among enemy German pilots, “Schwarze Vogelmenschen” ("Black Birdmen").

== Early life ==
Turner was born on 6 January 1920 in the Deanwood neighborhood of Washington D.C. He was the son of Reverend Clarence Turner I, a founding member of the First Baptist Church of Deanwood.

Turner attended Deanwood Elementary and Dunbar High School in Washington, DC.

== Military career ==
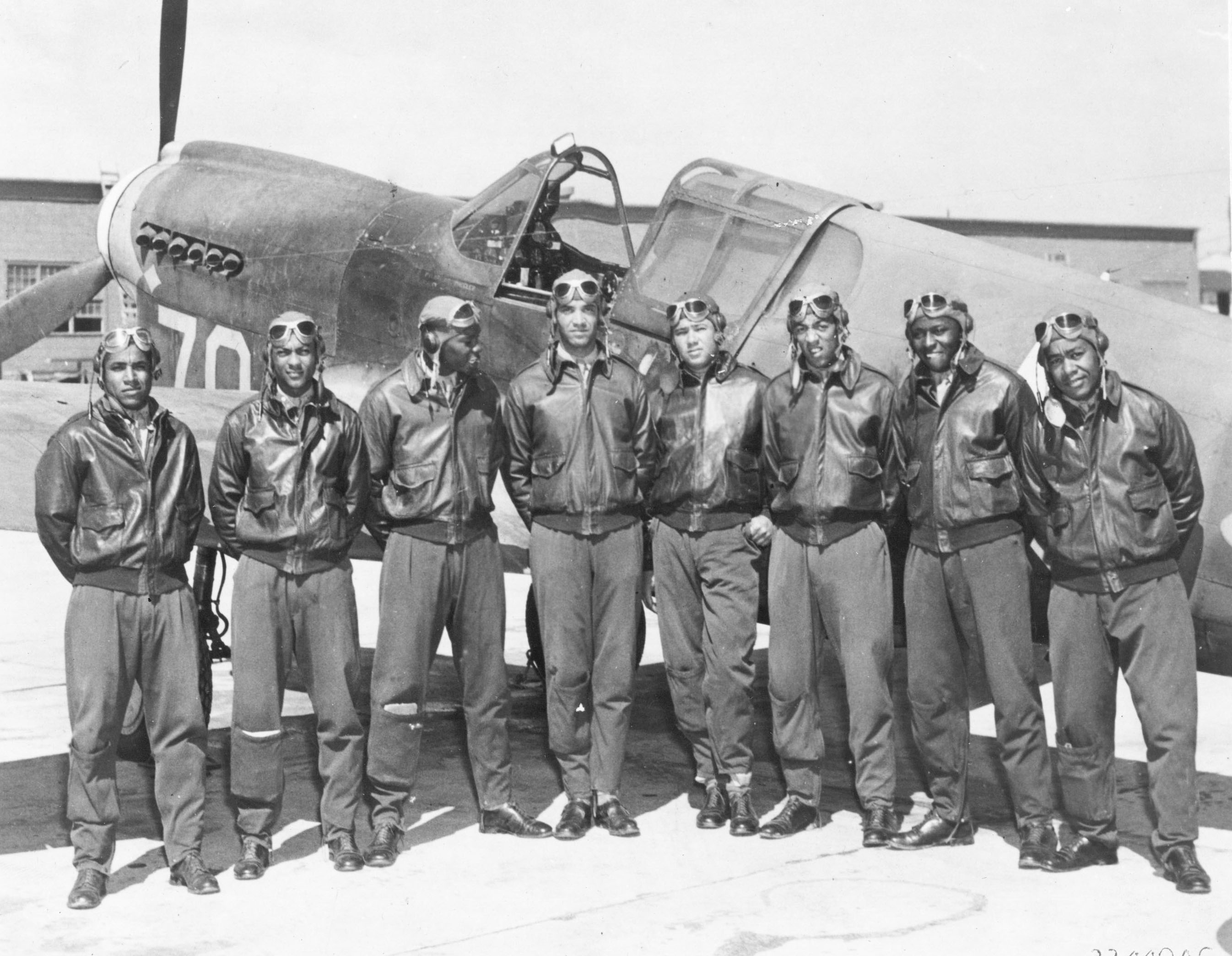
Class 42-I Left to right: Nathaniel M. Hill, Marshall S. Cabiness, Herman A. Lawson, William T. Mattison, John A. Gibson, Elwood T. Driver, Price D. Rice, Andrew D. Turner

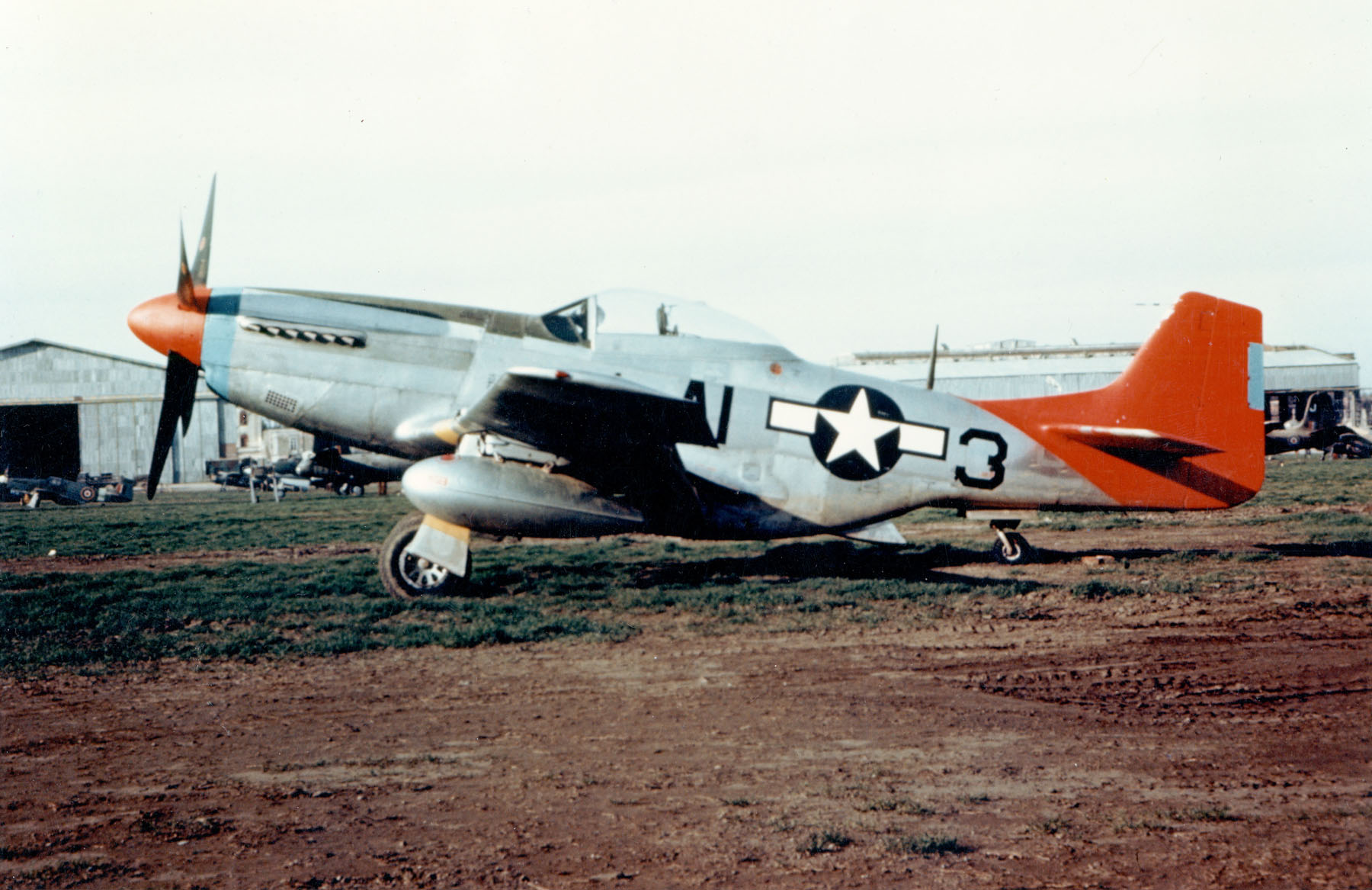
The Tuskegee Airmen's aircraft had distinctive markings that led to the name "Red Tails." (Note: The red markings that distinguished the Tuskegee Airmen included red bands on the noses of P-51s as well as a red rudder; their P-51B and D Mustangs flew with similar color schemes, with red propeller spinners, yellow wing bands and all-red tail surfaces.)

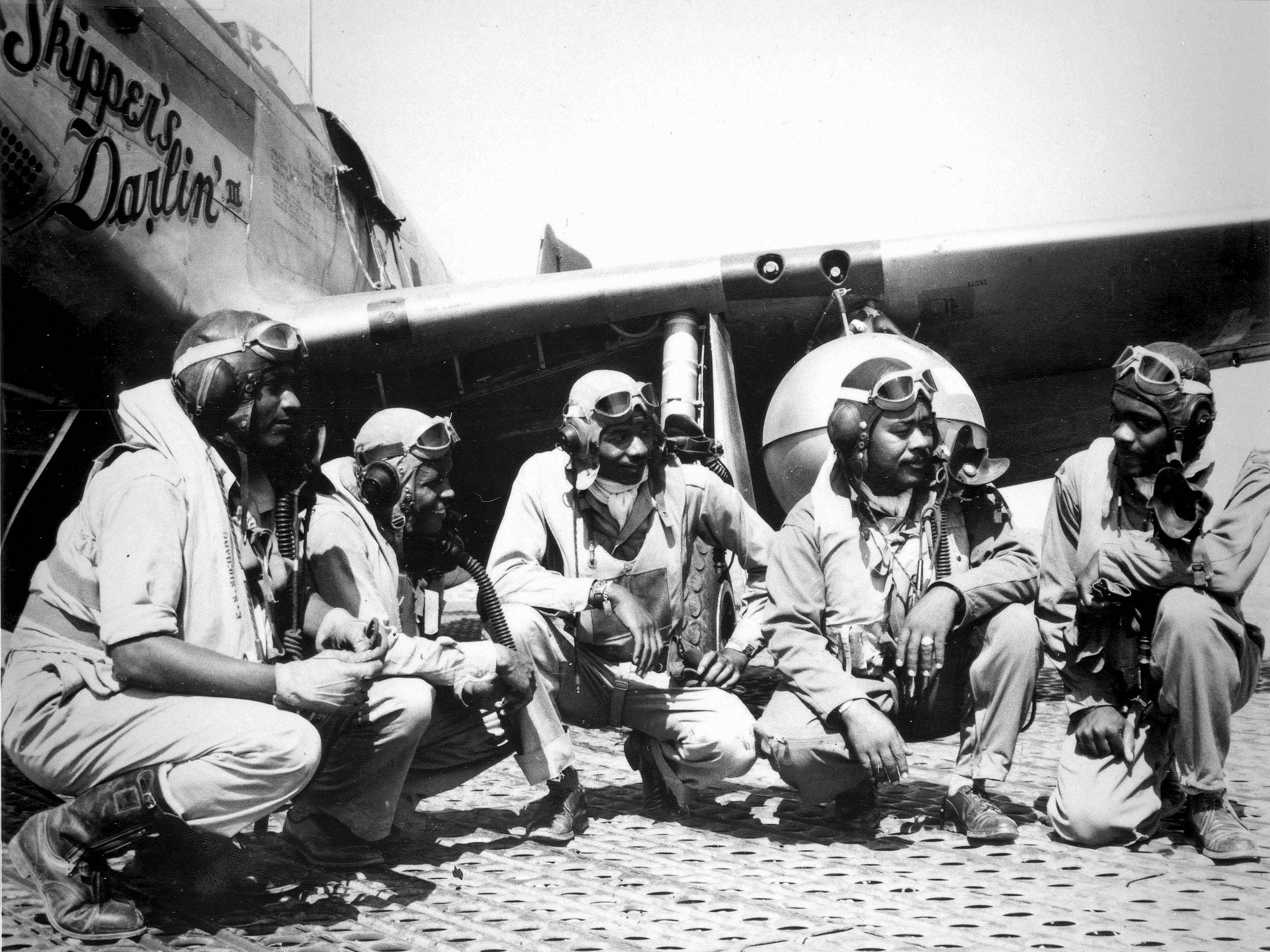
332nd Fighter Group at Ramitelli, Italy., from left to right, Lt. Dempsey W. Morgan, Lt. Carroll S. Woods, Lt. Robert H. Nelson, Jr., Capt. Andrew D. Turner, and Lt. Clarence P. Lester. (U.S. Air Force photo)

On 9 October 1942, Turner graduated from Tuskegee's cadet pilot training class 42-I-SE, receiving his wings and a commission as a 2nd Lieutenant. The U.S. Army Air Corps assigned Turner to the 332nd Fighter Group's 100th Fighter Squadron.

In June 1944, Turner became the 100th Fighter Squadron's commanding officer, after previous squadron commander, Lieutenant Robert B. Tresville, failed to return from a mission. On 18 July 1944, he was credited with damaging a German Bf 109 aircraft. During World War II, he flew a total of 69 missions.

He returned to the U.S. on 10 June 1945 and on 17 July became the deputy commander of the 477th Fighter Group at Godman Army Airfield which was training in preparation for deployment to the Pacific Theater. After the war Turner stayed in the USAAF and continued to serve in the 477th as it moved to Lockbourne Army Airfield in March 1946. With the reorganization of the 477th into the 332nd Fighter Group and then the 332nd Fighter Wing in mid-1946 he became the Wing's operations and training officer.

== Awards ==
- Air Medal with four oak leaf clusters
- Distinguished Flying Cross.
- Congressional Gold Medal (2006) awarded to the Tuskegee Airmen

== Death ==
On 14 September 1947 Turner was killed in a mid-air collision near Lockbourne when his Republic P-47N Thunderbolt crashed into another fighter pilot's aircraft, killing both pilots. He was interred at Arlington National Cemetery.

== See also ==
- List of Tuskegee Airmen Cadet Pilot Graduation Classes
- List of Tuskegee Airmen
- Military history of African Americans
- Dogfights (TV series)
- Executive Order 9981
- The Tuskegee Airmen (movie)
