= Price D. Rice =

Tuskegee Airman (1916–1999)

Colonel Price D. Rice
- Price D. Rice
- Born: Price D. Rice; October 22, 1916; Shelby, North Carolina, U.S.
- Died: February 21, 1999 (aged 82); San Francisco, California, U.S.
- Burial place: Arlington National Cemetery Section 68, Grave 2255
- Military career
- Allegiance: United States
- Branch: United States Army Air Forces
- Service years: 1942-1965
- Rank: Colonel
- Units: 99th Pursuit Squadron, 332nd Division, Tuskegee Airmen
- Conflicts: World War II
- Awards: Congressional Gold Medal

Price D. Rice (October 22, 1916 – February 21, 1999) was a U.S. Army Air Corps/U.S. Air Force officer and combat fighter pilot of the 332nd Fighter Group's 99th Fighter Squadron, best known as the Tuskegee Airmen. He was one of 1,007 documented Tuskegee Airmen Pilots.

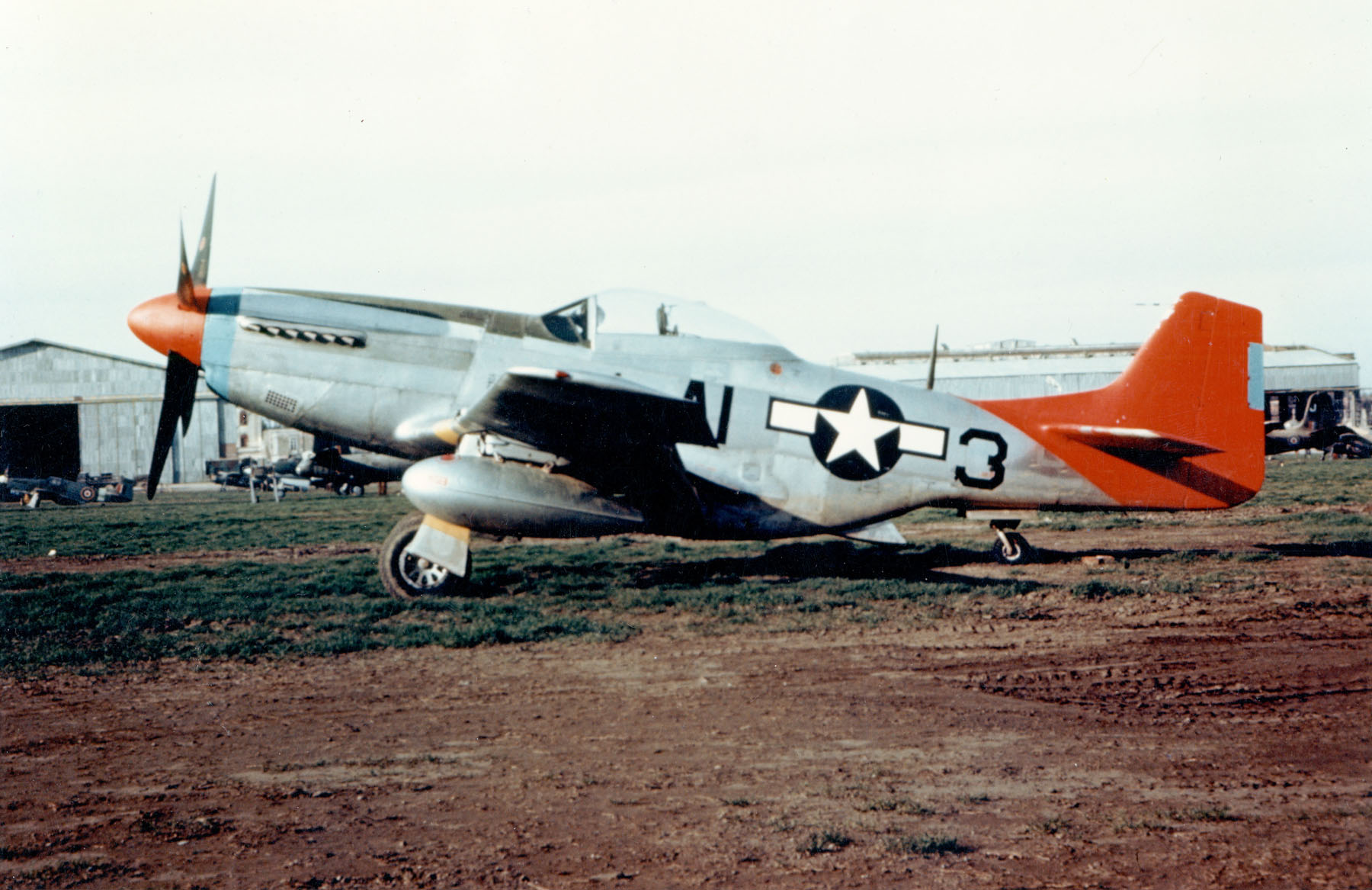
The Tuskegee Airmen's aircraft had distinctive markings that led to the name, "Red Tails." (Note: The red markings that distinguished the Tuskegee Airmen included red bands on the noses of P-51s as well as a red rudder; their P-51B and D Mustangs flew with similar color schemes, with red propeller spinners, yellow wing bands and all-red tail surfaces.)

== Early life ==
Born on October 22, 1916, in Shelby, North Carolina, Cleveland County, Rice was raised in Montclair, New Jersey.

Though there is little information on Price's first wife, Price had four daughters with her.

In 1962, Rice married Ohio State University alumnus and Howard University-trained physician Ellamae Simmons. In 1964, Price and Simmons relocated from Ohio to the San Francisco Bay Area in California. In 1977, Rice and Simmons divorced.

== Military career ==
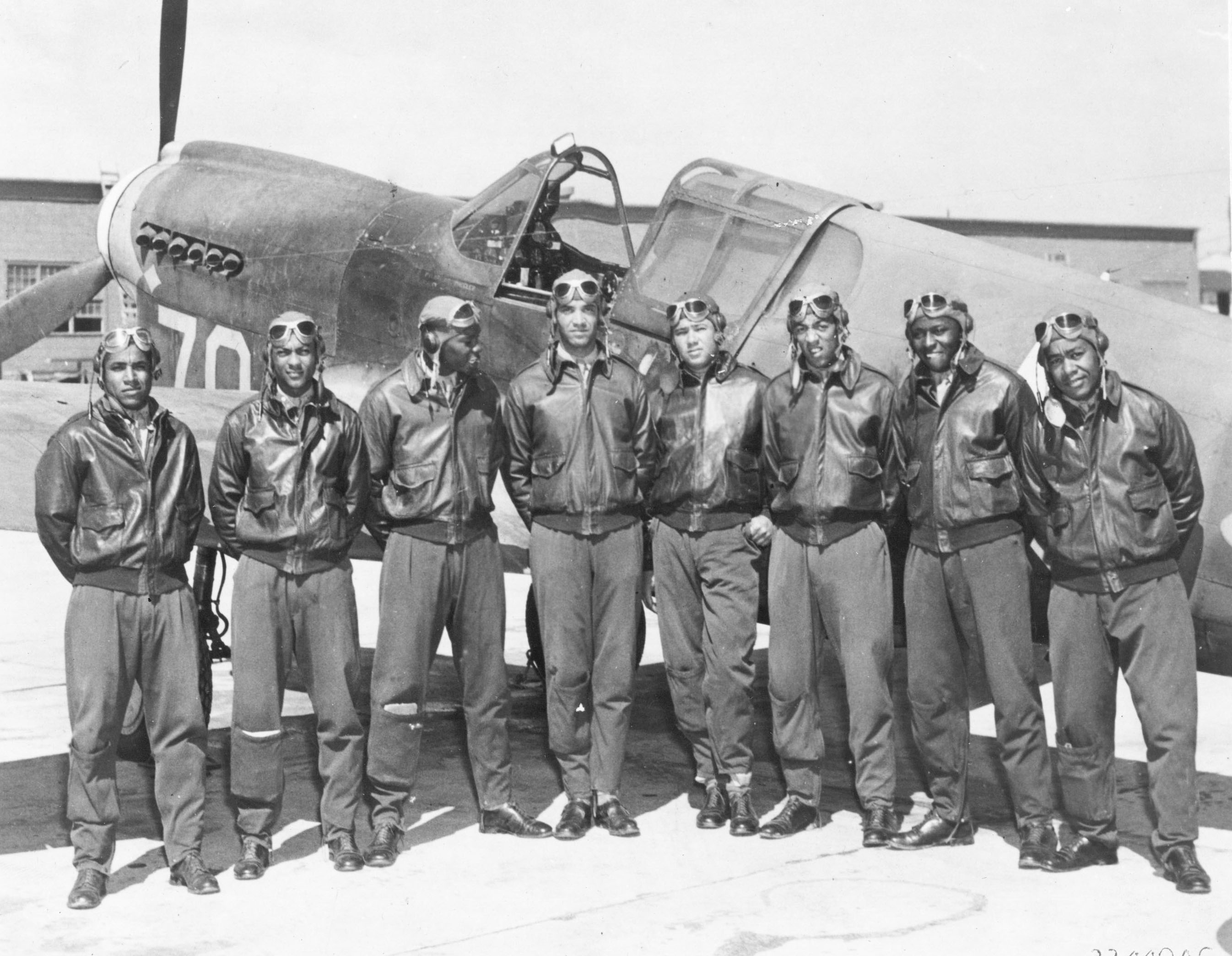
Class 42-I Left to right: Nathaniel M. Hill, Marshall S. Cabiness, Herman A. Lawson, William T. Mattison, John A. Gibson, Elwood T. Driver, Price D. Rice, Andrew D. Turner

Early 1942, Rice volunteered for service in the U.S. Army Air Corps. On October 9, 1942, Rice graduated from Tuskegee's cadet pilot training class 42-I-SE, receiving his wings and a commission as a 2nd Lieutenant.

After graduation, the U.S. Army Air Corps assigned Rice to the Tuskegee Airmen-99th Fighter Squadron where he flew patrol, strafing and bomber escort missions in World War II's Mediterranean and European Theater. Rice also served during Korea War and Vietnam War, retiring as a Colonel in 1965 after 23 years of active duty military service. He resided in the San Francisco Bay area until his death in 1999.

== Awards ==
- Congressional Gold Medal (2007)

== Death ==
Rice died on February 21, 1999, from complications from diabetes. He was 82. He was interred at Arlington National Cemetery, Section 68, Grave 2255, in Arlington, Virginia.

== See also ==
- Tuskegee Airmen
- List of Tuskegee Airmen Cadet Pilot Graduation Classes
- List of Tuskegee Airmen
- Military history of African Americans
- Dogfights (TV series)
- Executive Order 9981
- The Tuskegee Airmen (movie)
