= Elwood T. Driver =

American Tuskegee Airman aviator (1921–1992)

Major Elwood T. Driver
- Born: August 20, 1921; Trenton, New Jersey U.S.
- Died: March 26, 1992 (aged 70); Reston, Virginia, USA
- Education: New Jersey State College, BA; New York University, MS
- Spouse: Shirley Martin
- Children: 1
- Military career
- Allegiance: United States of America
- Branch: United States Army Air Force; United States Air Force
- Service years: 1942-1962
- Rank: Flight Commander
- Nickname: Woody
- Unit: Tuskegee Army Air Field
- Awards: Group Congressional Gold Medal awarded to Tuskegee Airmen

Elwood "Woody" T. Driver (August 20, 1921 – March 26, 1992) was an American aviator who served as a Tuskegee Airman during World War II. He flew 123 missions and he is given credit for one confirmed kill. In 1978 President Jimmy Carter nominated Driver to be a member of the National Transportation Safety Board.

== Early life ==
Elwood Driver was born in Trenton, New Jersey. He had three siblings. While attending Trenton State College, he earned his pilot's license. He graduated from college in 1942. Later he attended New York University and earned an MS in safety engineering.

Driver married Shirley Martin in 1960. He had one son, Timothy, from a previous marriage.

== Career ==
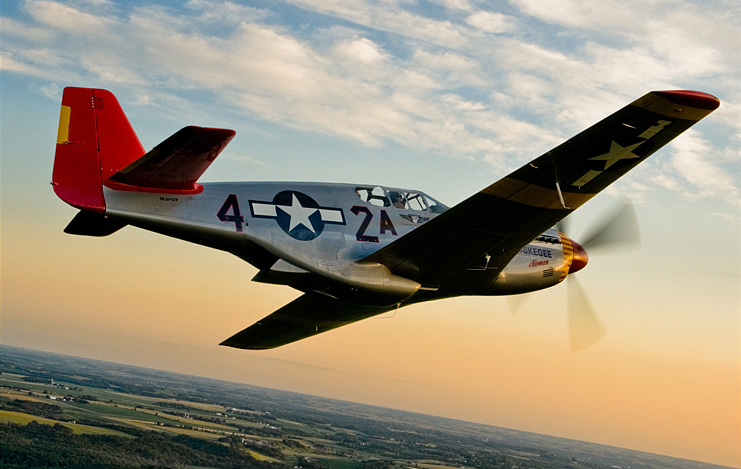
P-51 "Redtail" aircraft showing red markings. (Note: The Tuskegee Airmen became known for flying the P-51 "Redtail" aircraft that sported distinctive red markings that included red bands on the noses of P-51s as well as a red rudder. Their P-51B and D Mustangs flew with similar color schemes, with red propeller spinners, yellow wing bands and all-red tail surfaces.)

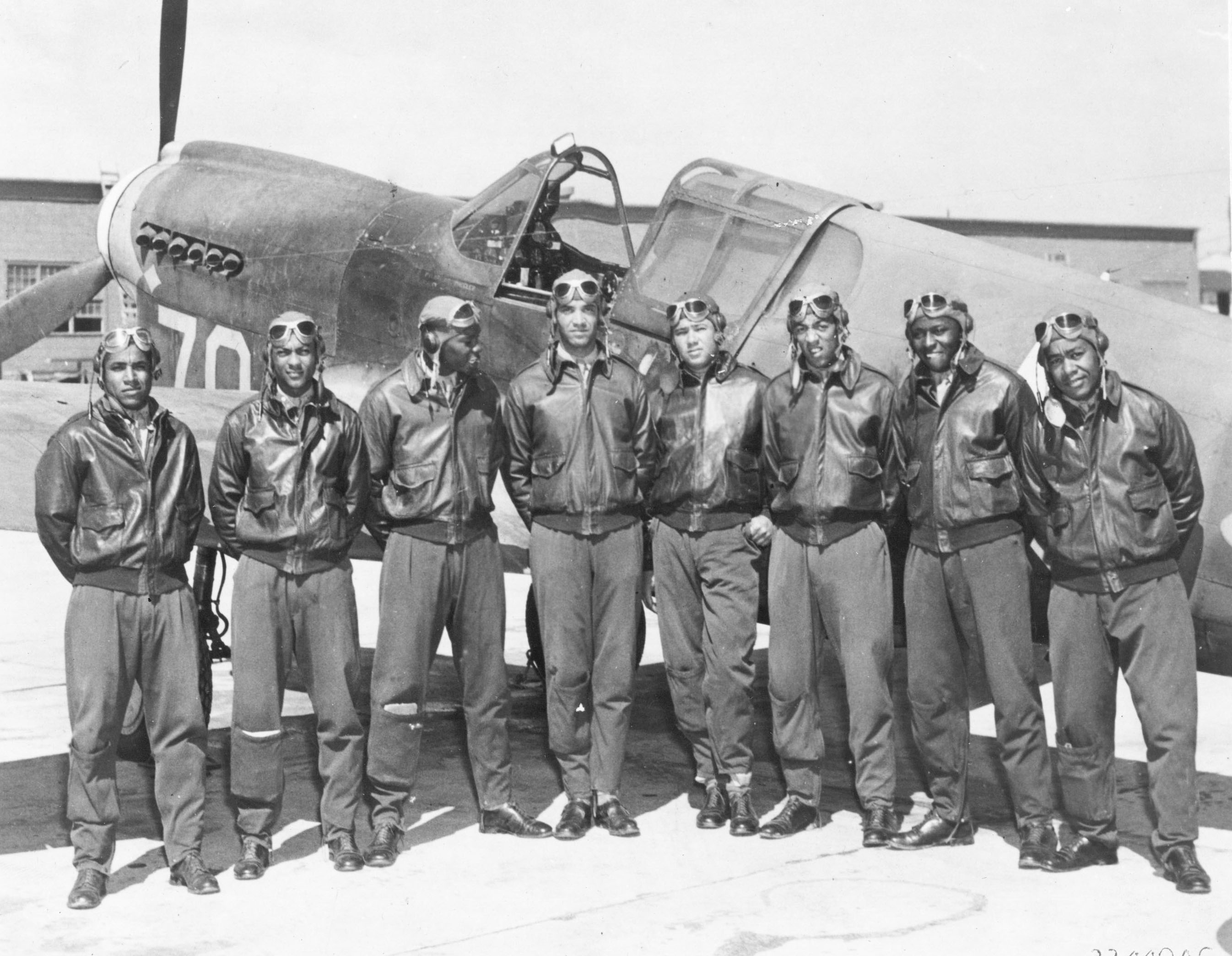
Class 42-I Left to right: Nathaniel M. Hill, Marshall S. Cabiness, Herman A. Lawson, William T. Mattison, John A. Gibson, Elwood T Driver, Price D. Rice, Andrew D. Turner

Driver signed up for the Army Air Corps in 1942. He became a Tuskegee Airman and was sent to the European Theatre where he recorded an aerial combat kill over Anzio, Italy. He retired from the Air force as a Major in 1962.

Driver worked with the National Transportation Safety Board beginning in 1967. In 1978, he was nominated to be a member of the Safety Board and served from 1978 to 1980.

Driver held a board of director position at Howard University.

== Awards and honors ==
In 2006, a Congressional Gold Medal was awarded to Tuskegee Airmen, including Driver.

== Death ==
On May 26, 1992, Driver died at his home in Reston, Virginia from liver cancer.

== See also ==
- Military history of African Americans
- List of Tuskegee Airmen Cadet Pilot Graduation Classes
