= Sibak Al Fursan (Race of the Horsemen) =

- Developer(s): Kuma Reality Games
- Publisher(s): Kuma Reality Games
- Platform(s): Windows
- Release: 2010
- Genre(s): Racing
- Mode(s): Single-player, multiplayer

Sibak Al Fursan (Race of the Horsemen) is a free-to-play 3D, episodic racing game developed by Kuma Reality Games. Set in and made for the Middle Eastern gamer, the game has been translated into local language dialogue including Arabic, French, Urdu and Persian. A global release into the United States, Latin America, and beyond are scheduled for late 2011.

Players can earn Golden Thorium Beans (GTBs) by placing in a race to use towards the purchase of microtransactions, such as oil slicks, reactive bumpers, and spring traps to use against opponents.

== Gamisodes ==
Each week, players will receive a new "gamisode" in the series. Sibak Al Fursan is set to release 12 episodes.

Episode 1: City of the Horsemen : The race to reclaim the lost city of Dubai as the Horsemen's home begins! When police corruption and violence causes the fiery destruction of 50 race cars and their precious Hologs, the Horsemen turn anger into action.

Episode 2: Border Run : The race to save Dima takes a deadly turn when the warlords controlling the Capital City's Thorium mines launch a vicious attack on the Horsemen.

Episode 3: War Zone : Scouring a refugee camp on the border for signs of Dima, the Horsemen soon find themselves under attack from the Army and the False Caliph.

Episode 4: The Glass Desert : Dima-Holog leads Ahmed to Dima's signal - smack in the center of the poisoned waste of the Glass Desert and at the feet of the wicked False Caliph!

Episode 5: The Free City of Damascus : With Dima's tracking signal gone, the Horsemen must cross the Old Battlefield, where Ahmed must lead the Horsemen through a veritable forest of unexploded missiles and radioactive waste—a dark reminder of Iran's long siege of Damascus.

Episode 6: The Shield of the Horsemen : Having braved the Old Battlefield, the Horsemen finally reached the Free City of Damascus. The race is on to celebrate the arrival of the Horsemen clans as they continue their search for their lost princess.

Episode 7: The Tunnel of Ancient Secrets : Ahmed and the Horsemen must race through the Tunnel of Ancient Secrets located in Damascus before the Dragon Clan can kidnap Dr. Al Assaf.

Episode 8: The Fight for Dr. Al Assaf : Ahmed and the Horsemen must battle against the Dragon Clan in a demolition derby to rescue the kidnapped Doctor.

Episode 9: Rescue the Nuke Scientists : Dima and the Oasis group rise up and free their fellow scientists from the nuclear weapons lab in old Esfahan—but she is trapped by the radioactivity in the ravaged city. Alimah prepares to race through a Fasadi road block, and radios Ahmed sweet words of farewell...

== See also ==
- Episodic games
- List of racing video games
