= Lee Archer (pilot) =

Tuskegee Airman fighter Ace (1919–2010)

Lee Andrew Archer, Jr.
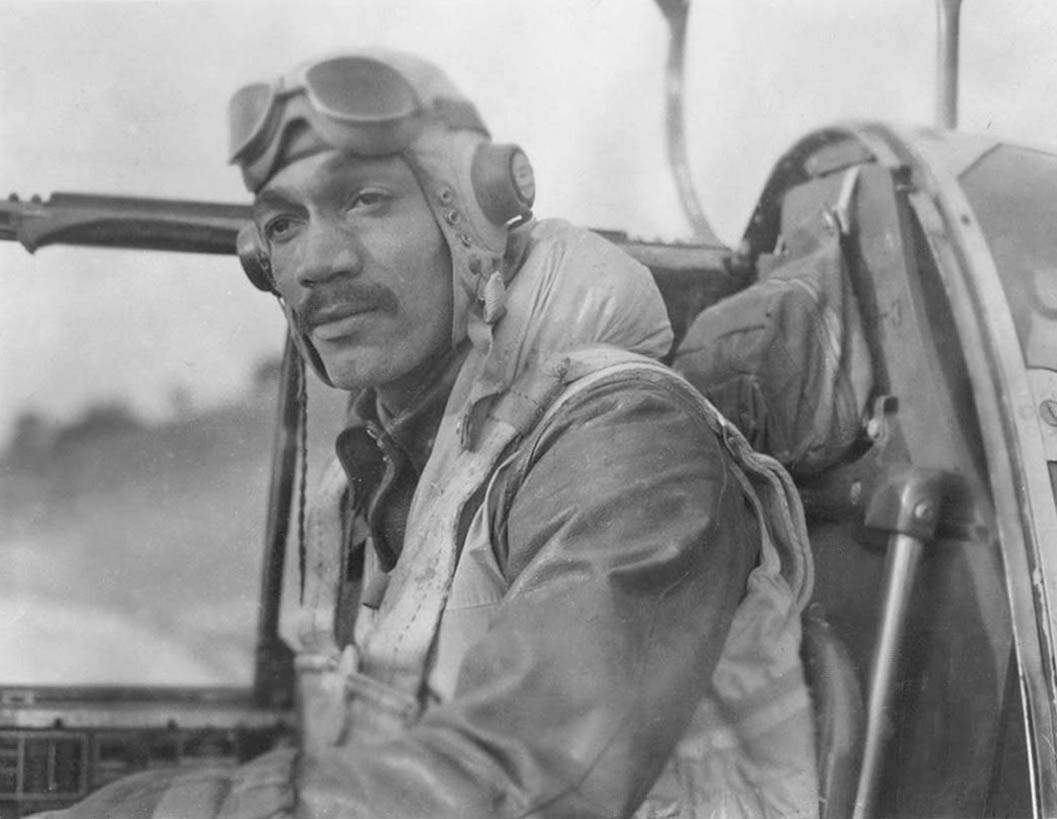
- Lee Archer in World War II
- Born: September 6, 1919; Yonkers, New York, U.S.
- Died: January 27, 2010 (aged 90); Manhattan, New York, U.S.
- Burial place: Arlington National Cemetery
- Military career
- Allegiance: United States
- Branch: United States Army Air Forces; United States Air Force
- Service years: 1941–1970
- Rank: Lieutenant colonel
- Nickname: Buddy
- Units: 332nd Fighter Squadron; Tuskegee Airmen
- Commands: 7416th Material Squadron
- Conflicts: World War II; Korean War
- Awards: Distinguished Flying Cross; Meritorious Service Medal; Air Medal (9); Air Force Commendation Medal (2); Congressional Gold Medal

Lee Andrew Archer, Jr. (September 6, 1919 – January 27, 2010) was an American fighter Ace in the 332nd Fighter Group, commonly known as the Tuskegee Airmen, during World War II. He was one of the first African American military aviators in the United States Army Air Corps, the United States Army Air Forces and later the United States Air Force, eventually earning the rank of lieutenant colonel.

During World War II, Archer flew 169 combat missions, including bomber escort, reconnaissance and ground attack. Archer claimed and was credited with five enemy fighter aircraft shot down, making him an ace.

Archer was one of only four Tuskegee Airmen to have earned three aerial victories in a single day of combat: Joseph Elsberry, Clarence Lester, and Harry T. Stewart Jr.

== Early life ==
Born in Yonkers, New York, Archer grew up in New York's Harlem, Manhattan neighborhood, later attending New York University. After graduation, he joined the United States Army in the hopes of becoming a pilot. At that time, the Army did not accept black pilots, so Archer was posted to a communications job as a telegrapher and field network-communications specialist in Georgia. When the Army's policy changed, he was accepted to the training program for black aviators at Tuskegee Army Airfield in Alabama, graduating first in his class, and one of only 994 black wartime pilots to graduate there. He was commissioned as a second lieutenant on July 28, 1943.

== World War II ==
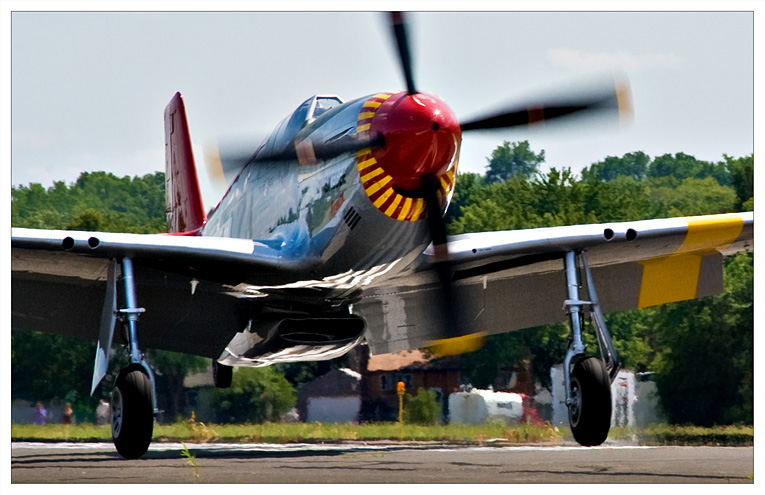
A restored P-51C Mustang in Lee Archer's markings, is now flown by Kermit Weeks, at Fantasy of Flight. (Note: Markings that distinguished the Tuskegee Airmen included red bands on the noses of P-51s as well as a red rudder; their P-51B, C and D Mustangs flew with similar color schemes, with red propeller spinners, yellow wing bands and all-red tail surfaces.)

Archer is the only black U.S. pilot to earn an "ace" designation, for shooting down at least five enemy aircraft. Archer was acknowledged to have shot down four planes, and he and another pilot, Lt Hutchins both claimed victory for shooting down a fifth aircraft. An investigation by the Air Force years later, revealed Lt. Archer had inflicted the damage that destroyed the Bf-109, by destroying the Bf-109's left wing; causing it to spiral into the ground. This was also verified by Lt. Hutchins. (source needed)

The Air Force eventually confirmed him an ace pilot. Archer also destroyed six aircraft on the ground during a strafing mission in August 1944, as well as several locomotives, motor transports and barges.

While flying with the 302nd Fighter Squadron, as a combat pilot, nicknamed "Buddy", Archer flew 169 combat missions in the European Theatre of World War II, flying the Bell P-39 Airacobra, Republic P-47 Thunderbolt and North American P-51 Mustang fighter aircraft. (Note: During the latter part of the war, Archer flew a North American P-51C Mustang, sporting "Ina The Macon Belle" on its nose, named after his wife, Ina, and adorned with a Zoot-suited "Hep Cat" painted on its rear fuselage.) Flying a P-51C fighter with the distinctive red tail of the 332nd Fighter Group, known collectively as the "Tuskegee Airmen", he scored his first victory, a Messerschmitt Bf 109 on July 18, 1944, over Memmingen, Germany. (Note: On this mission the 332d FG was escorting B-17s of the 483d Bomb Group. Although 15 Fortresses were lost to fighter interception in the fierce air battle, the 332d was credited with nine victories including Archer's.)

Archer is best remembered for his exploits of October 12, 1944. In the midst of a furious series of dogfights over German-occupied Hungary, he shot down three Hungarian Bf 109s over Lake Balaton, Hungary, in engagements that spanned only 10 minutes.

Archer was one of only four Tuskegee Airmen to have earned three aerial victories in a single day of combat: Joseph Elsberry, Clarence Lester, and Harry Stewart, Jr. Moreover, Archer was one of only nine 332nd Fighter Group pilots with at least three confirmed kills during World War II:

- Joseph Elsberry – 332nd Fighter Group's 301st Fighter Squadron – 4 Confirmed Kills, 1 Possible
- Edward L. Toppins – 332nd Fighter Group's 99th Fighter Squadron – 4 Confirmed Kills, 1 Possible
- Lee Archer – 332nd Fighter Group's 302nd Fighter Squadron – 5 Confirmed Kills
- Charles B. Hall – 332nd Fighter Group's 99th Fighter Squadron 3 confirmed kills
- Leonard M. Jackson – 332nd Fighter Group's 99th Fighter Squadron – 3 Confirmed Kills
- Clarence D. Lester – 332nd Fighter Group's 100th Fighter Squadron – 3 Confirmed Kills
- Wendell O. Pruitt – 332nd Fighter Group's 302nd Fighter Squadron – 3 Confirmed Kills
- Roger Romine – 332nd Fighter Group's 302nd Fighter Squadron – 3 Confirmed Kill, 1 Unconfirmed
- Harry Stewart, Jr. – 332nd Fighter Group's 301st Fighter Squadron – 3 Confirmed Kills

When Archer returned home in 1945 as a recipient of the Distinguished Flying Cross, he found that nothing seemed to have changed in American society. "I flew 169 combat missions when most pilots were flying 50," Archer told the Chicago Tribune in 2004. "When I came back to the U.S. and down that gangplank, there was a sign at the bottom: ′Colored Troops to the Right, White Troops to the Left′."

Archer remained in the armed forces for a career as the United States Army Air Forces transitioned into the present day United States Air Force in 1947. He later flew missions during the Korean War, became a diplomatic officer at Supreme Headquarters Allied Powers Europe (SHAPE) and then became the headquarters chief of the U.S. Air Force Southern Command in Panama, eventually retiring as a lieutenant colonel in 1970.

== Later career ==
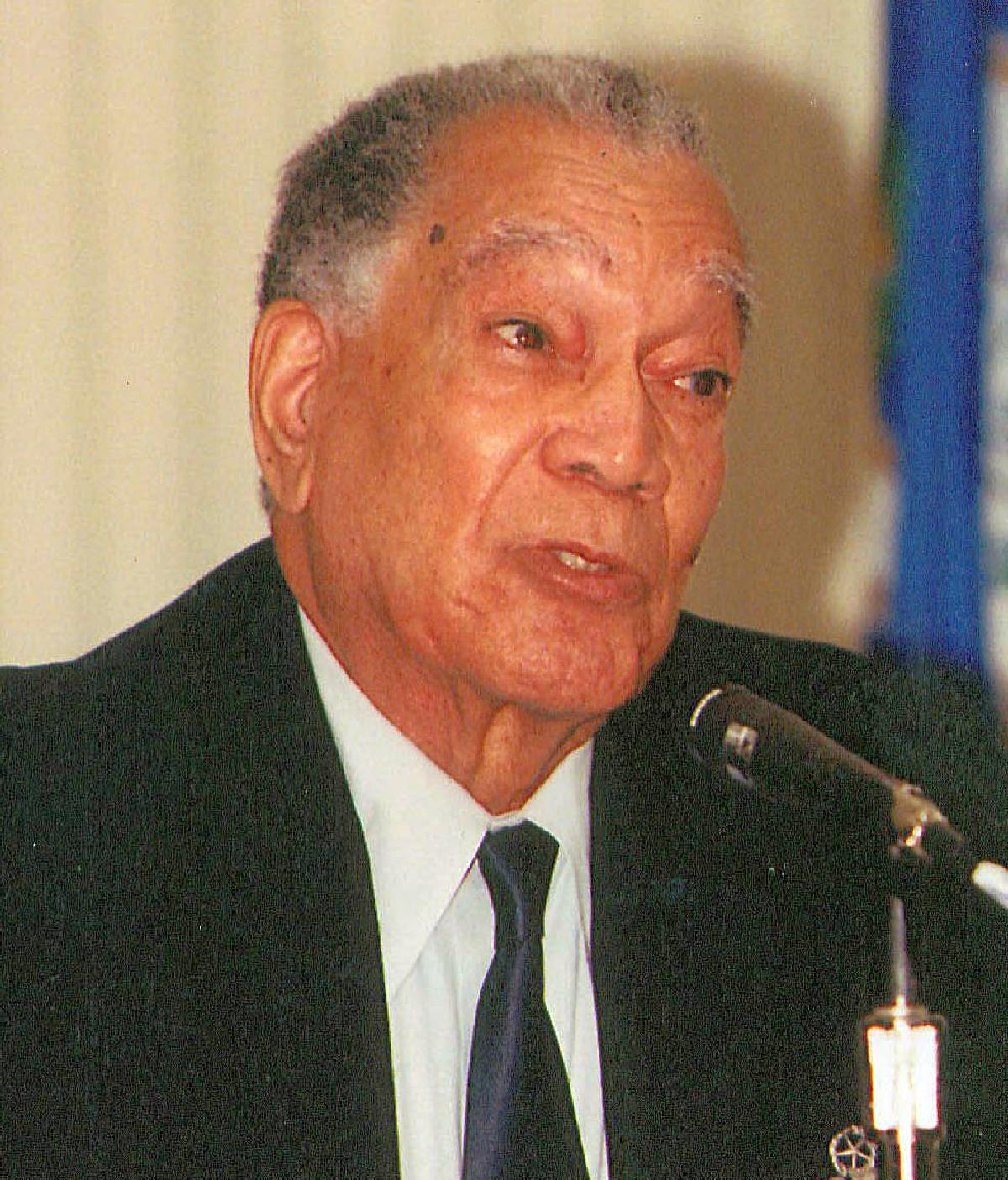
Archer speaking at the San Diego Aerospace Museum, September 2003.

Television personality Bill Cosby (right) eulogized Archer at a Riverside Church memorial service on February 4, 2010.

After retiring from the military, Archer joined General Foods Corporation in White Plains, N.Y. where he became one of the first black corporate vice presidents of a major U.S. company. While there he also led its small-business investment subsidiary, North Street Capital Corporation, which serviced clients such as Essence Communications and Black Enterprise Magazine. In 1987 he helped establish the food conglomerate TLC Beatrice and in the same year founded the venture capital firm Archer Asset Management. Archer became a longtime resident of New Rochelle, New York.

In October 2005, Archer and four fellow Tuskegee veterans, retired pilot Lt. Colonel Robert Ashby, Retired Master Sgt James A. Sheppard, Retired Colonel Richard Tolliver, and retired Technical Sergeant George Watson Sr. visited Balad Air Base at Balad, Iraq, to meet with 700 servicemen from the 332nd Air Expeditionary Wing, the successor unit to his all-black outfit.

"This is the new Air Force," he told The Associated Press. In the dining room, he said, he saw "black, white, Asian, Pacific Islanders, people from different parts of Europe. This," he said, "is what America is."

== Illness and death ==
In April 2009, Archer was selected to be an adviser for the George Lucas produced film, Red Tails. Archer, aged 90, died at Cornell University Medical Center in New York City on January 27, 2010, as a result of coronary complications, according to his son Roy Archer. His death came during the post-production work on the Lucas film Red Tails, and the film's final credits subsequently bore a tribute to the pilot. At a memorial service for Archer held at the Riverside Church on February 4, entertainer and commentator Bill Cosby gave a eulogy.

Archer was predeceased by his wife, Ina Burdell, who died in 1996 and was survived by his three sons, one daughter and four granddaughters. He is buried at Arlington National Cemetery.

== Awards and tributes ==
=== Military awards ===

U.S. Air Force Command Pilot Badge
Distinguished Flying Cross	Meritorious Service Medal	Air Medal with 1 silver and 3 bronze oak leaf clusters
Air Force Commendation Medal with 1 bronze oak leaf cluster	Air Force Presidential Unit Citation	Army Good Conduct Medal
American Campaign Medal	European–African–Middle Eastern Campaign Medal with 3 bronze campaign stars	World War II Victory Medal
National Defense Service Medal with 1 bronze service star	Korean Service Medal	Air Force Longevity Service Award with 1 silver oak leaf cluster
Small Arms Expert Marksmanship Ribbon	Legion of Honour; Chevalier	United Nations Korea Medal

=== Other honors ===
- Archer earned special citations for his work from Presidents Dwight D. Eisenhower, John F. Kennedy and Lyndon B. Johnson.
- Archer and his fellow Tuskegee airmen were awarded the Congressional Gold Medal in 2007.
- Archer was an Honoree of the American Fighter Aces Association.
- Aviation warplane collector and pilot Kermit Weeks restored and flew a P-51 fighter painted in tribute to Archer, in the colorful markings of Archer's "Ina the Macon Belle", originally dedicated to his wife, Ina Burdell.
- A youth flight training program was established in honor of Lee A. Archer Jr. by Glendon Fraser, President of the "Major General Irene Trowell-Harris chapter" of the Tuskegee Airmen, Inc. The Lee A. Archer Jr., Red Tail Youth Flying Program operates out of Newburgh, New York and accepts high school students from the Orange County, New York area.
- Freedom medal

== See also ==
- Dogfights (TV series)
- Executive Order 9981
- List of Tuskegee Airmen
- Military history of African Americans
- The Tuskegee Airmen (movie)
