= Shootout! =

- Country of origin: United States
- Original language: English
- No. of seasons: 2
- No. of episodes: 22

Original release
- Network: History Channel
- Release: July 19, 2005 – December 29, 2006

Shootout! is a documentary series featured on the History Channel and ran for two seasons from 2005 to 2006. It depicts actual firefights between United States military personnel and other combatants. There are also occasional episodes dedicated to police or S.W.A.T. team firefights, as well as Wild West shootouts. It also has a feature of downloading and playing a first-person shooter, developed by Kuma Reality Games, detailing some of the battles. The battles include skirmishes from World War II, the Vietnam War, and the ongoing war on terror in Afghanistan and during the 2003-2011 Iraq War. Season 1 was produced for The History Channel by Greystone Communications and Season 2 was produced by Flight 33 Productions. The series was created by Dolores Gavin and Louis Tarantino.

== Season 1 episodes ==
- D-Day: Fallujah (Second Battle of Fallujah)
- Guadalcanal (Battle of Guadalcanal)
- Wild West (Northfield Raid, Battle of Ingalls)
- WWII: Assault on Germany (Siegfried Line Campaign, Battle of Hill 400, Operation Varsity)
- Battle for Baghdad (Battle of Baghdad)
- North Hollywood shootout
- WWII: The Pacific (Makin Raid, New Georgia Campaign, Battle of Peleliu, Battle of Luzon)
- SWAT Team Shootouts (1991 Sacramento hostage crisis)
- Iraq's Ambush Alley (Battle of Nasiriyah)
- Hunt for Bin Laden
- WWII: Storming France
- Battlecry Iraq: Ramadi (Battle of Ramadi)

== Season 2 episodes ==
Produced by Flight 33 Productions, the production team included executive producers Louis Tarantino and Douglas Cohen, producers Samuel K. Dolan, Brian Thompson and Tony Long.

- Iraq's Most Wanted (Battle of Najaf, the killing of Uday and Qusay Hussein)
- Iwo Jima: Fight to the Death (Battle of Iwo Jima)
- Battle of the Bulge (Battle of the Bulge)
- Iraq's Most Wanted: Terror at the Border (Battle of Al Qaim)
- Okinawa: The Last Battle of World War II (Battle of Okinawa)
- Raid on the Bataan Death Camp (Battle of Bataan, Cabanatuan Raid)
- Tet Offensive (Tet Offensive)
- The Big Red One (Operation Torch, Battle of El Guettar, Invasion of Sicily, Operation Overlord)
- Afghanistan's Deadliest Snipers (Operation Anaconda, Operation Asbury Park, the death of Pat Tillman)
- Return to Fallujah (Second Battle of Fallujah)

== Video game ==
Shootout! is a free episodic first-person shooter computer game developed by Kuma Reality Games. It is based on the show's World War II and Vietnam War episodes.

== See also ==
- The Lost Evidence
- Dogfights (TV)
