= The Lost Evidence =

- Country of origin: United States
- No. of episodes: 23

Original release
- Network: History Channel
- Release: 2004

The Lost Evidence is a television program on the History Channel which uses three-dimensional landscapes, reconnaissance photos, eyewitness testimony and documents to reevaluate and recreate key battles of World War II. The entire series was made up of 23 fifty-minute episodes with the exception of the D-Day episode, which is 100 minutes in length (or 1 hour and 40 minutes).

The first episode aired in the United Kingdom in 2004.

Episode Number	Title
Episode 1	D-Day
Episode 2	North Africa
Episode 3	Battle of the Bulge
Episode 4	Sicily
Episode 5	Liberation of Paris
Episode 6	Breakout from Normandy
Episode 7	Battle of Berlin
Episode 8	Crossing the Rhine
Episode 9	Monte Cassino
Episode 10	Stalingrad
Episode 11	Operation Market Garden
Episode 12	Peleliu
Episode 13	El Alamein
Episode 14	Battle of Britain
Episode 15	Luzon
Episode 16	Guam
Episode 17	Okinawa
Episode 18	Leyte Gulf
Episode 19	Saipan
Episode 20	Guadalcanal
Episode 21	Tarawa
Episode 22	Iwo Jima
Episode 23	Pearl Harbor

== Broadcast Airings ==
Repeats of the series are currently airing on Military History and the digital broadcast network Quest.

== See also ==
- History Channel
- Shootout!
- Dogfights
