= William L. Igoe =

American politician (1879–1953)

Harris & Ewing photo, Library of Congress

William Leo Igoe (October 19, 1879 – April 20, 1953) was a United States representative from Missouri.

Igoe was born in St. Louis to Irish immigrants. He attended the public and parochial schools of St. Louis and graduated from the law school of Washington University in St. Louis in 1902. He was admitted to the bar in the same year and commenced the practice of law in St. Louis. He was a member of the municipal assembly of St. Louis from 1909 until March 3, 1913, when he resigned to enter the United States Congress.

Igoe was elected as a Democrat to the Sixty-third and to the three succeeding Congresses (March 4, 1913 – March 3, 1921). On April 6, 1917, he joined 49 other representatives in voting against declaring war on Germany. He declined to become a candidate for renomination in 1920. He had opted to run for president initially, but ruled it out due to the political implications of a Coolidge presidency. He resumed the practice of law and was an unsuccessful Democratic nominee for mayor of St. Louis in 1925. He was chairman of the St. Louis Board of Police Commissioners 1933–1937. He died in St. Louis on April 20, 1953 and is buried in Calvary Cemetery.

== Legacy ==
After his death, he was one of two namesakes, along with Air Force pilot Wendell O. Pruitt, of the Pruitt-Igoe public housing project in St. Louis.

== Bibliography ==
- Thompson, Alice Anne. "The Life and Career of William L. Igoe, The Reluctant Boss from 1879 to 1953." Ph.D. dissertation, St. Louis University, 1980.
- United States Congress. "William L. Igoe (id: I000005)". Biographical Directory of the United States Congress.

U.S. House of Representatives
Preceded by Patrick F. Gill	Member of the U.S. House of Representatives from Missouri's 11th congressional district 1913–1921	Succeeded by Harry B. Hawes
