= Fowler, California =

City in California, United States

- City
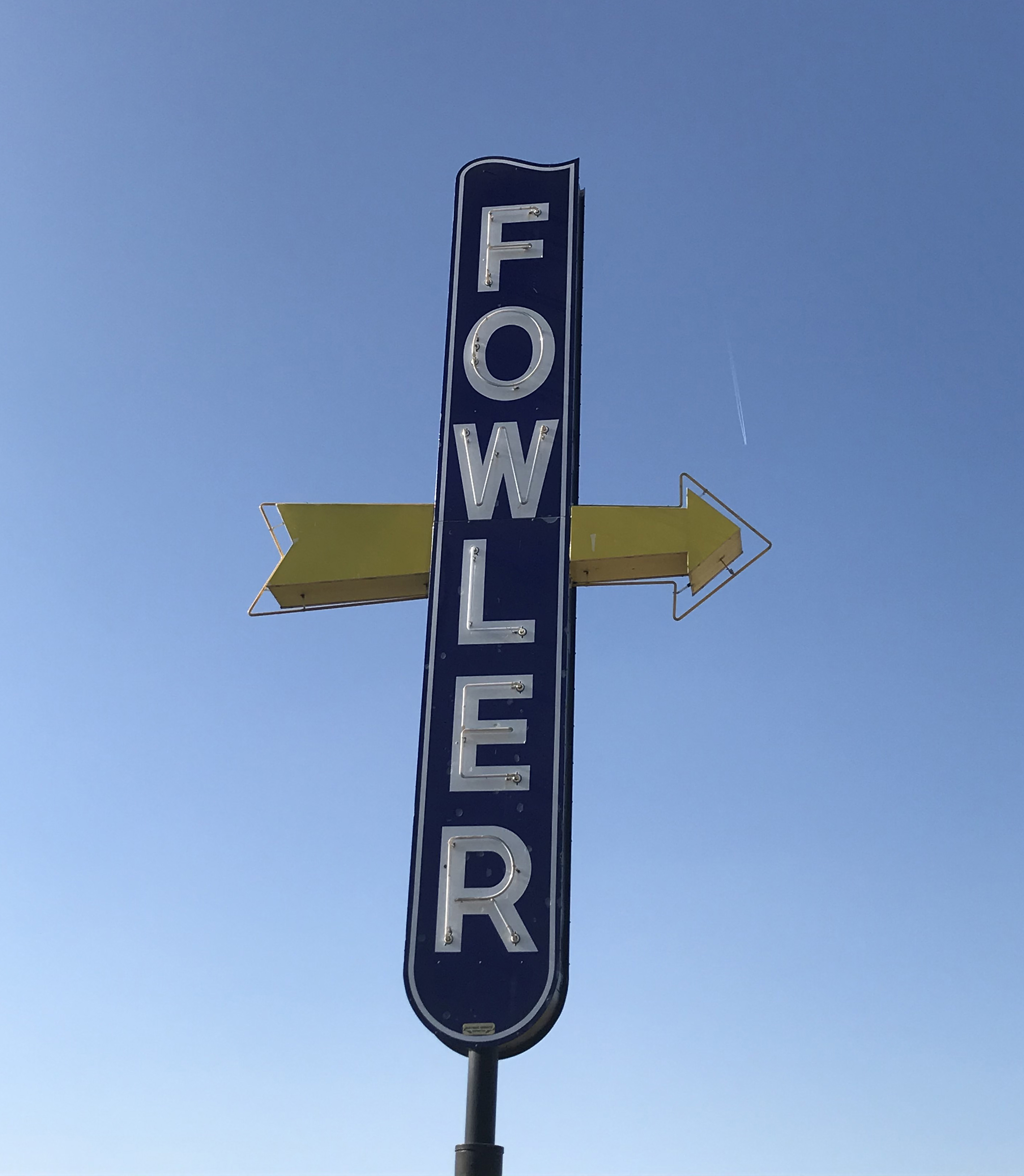
- Sign at the intersection of Golden State Blvd. and E Merced St. in Fowler

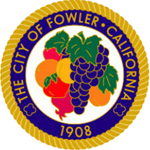
- Seal
- Interactive map of Fowler, California
- Location in the United States
- Coordinates: 36°38′N 119°41′W
- Country: United States
- State: California
- County: Fresno
- Incorporated: June 15, 1908

Government
  - Mayor: Juan Mejia
  - Mayor Pro-Tem: Amarjeet Gill
  - State Senate: Anna Caballero (D)
  - State Assembly: Joaquin Arambula (D)
  - U. S. Congress: Jim Costa (D)

Area
  - Total: 2.53 sq mi (6.56 km^{2})
  - Land: 2.53 sq mi (6.56 km^{2})
  - Water: 0 sq mi (0.00 km^{2}) 0%
- Elevation: 308 ft (94 m)

Population (2020)
  - Total: 6,700
  - Estimate (2024): 7,470
  - Density: 2,600/sq mi (1,000/km^{2})
- Time zone: UTC-8 (Pacific (PST))
  - Summer (DST): UTC-7 (PDT)
- ZIP code: 93625
- Area code: 559
- FIPS code: 06-25436
- GNIS feature IDs: 1659724, 2410538
- Website: www.fowlercity.org

Fowler (formerly, Fowler's Switch) is a city in Fresno County, California, United States. It is located within the San Joaquin Valley. It has a strong agricultural community, with lush grape vineyards and expansive farmland. Fowler is located 11 miles (18 km) southeast of downtown Fresno, at an elevation of 308 feet (94 m). The population was 6,700 at the 2020 census, and 5,570 at the 2010 census.

== History ==
Fowler's first post office opened in 1882. Fowler was incorporated June 15, 1908. The community was named for rancher Thomas Fowler, an early 1870s California state senator.

== Geography ==
According to the United States Census Bureau, the city has a total area of 2.5 square miles (6.5 km^{2}), all land.

== Demographics ==
Historical population
Census	Pop.	Note	%±
1910	675		—
1920	1,528		126.4%
1930	1,171		−23.4%
1940	1,531		30.7%
1950	1,857		21.3%
1960	1,892		1.9%
1970	2,239		18.3%
1980	2,496		11.5%
1990	3,208		28.5%
2000	3,979		24.0%
2010	5,570		40.0%
2020	6,700		20.3%
2024 (est.)	7,470	▲	11.5%
U.S. Decennial Census

=== 2020 census ===
As of the 2020 census, Fowler had a population of 6,700 and a population density of 2,646.1 inhabitants per square mile (1,021.7/km^{2}). The median age was 34.6 years, with 27.6% of residents under age 18, 9.6% aged 18 to 24, 26.9% aged 25 to 44, 23.5% aged 45 to 64, and 12.4% aged 65 or older. For every 100 females, there were 96.9 males, and for every 100 females age 18 and over, there were 94.4 males age 18 and over.

The census reported that 99.3% of the population lived in households and 0.7% were institutionalized. There were 2,049 households, of which 46.8% had children under age 18, 54.7% were married-couple households, 6.4% were cohabiting couple households, 23.4% had a female householder with no spouse or partner present, and 15.4% had a male householder with no spouse or partner present. About 16.3% of households were one person households, and 6.7% had someone living alone who was 65 years of age or older. The average household size was 3.25, and there were 1,620 families (79.1% of all households).

There were 2,133 housing units at an average density of 842.4 units per square mile (325.3 units/km^{2}), of which 2,049 (96.1%) were occupied. Of occupied units, 61.3% were owner-occupied and 38.7% were occupied by renters. Overall, 3.9% of housing units were vacant; the homeowner vacancy rate was 0.5% and the rental vacancy rate was 2.9%.

Of residents, 99.6% lived in urban areas and 0.4% lived in rural areas.

Racial composition as of the 2020 census
Race	Number	Percent
White	2,038	30.4%
Black or African American	103	1.5%
American Indian and Alaska Native	140	2.1%
Asian	911	13.6%
Native Hawaiian and Other Pacific Islander	4	0.1%
Some other race	2,429	36.3%
Two or more races	1,075	16.0%
Hispanic or Latino (of any race)	4,446	66.4%

=== Demographic estimates ===
In 2023, the US Census Bureau estimated that 19.2% of the population were foreign-born. Of all people aged 5 or older, 51.2% spoke only English at home, 40.9% spoke Spanish, 7.7% spoke other Indo-European languages, and 0.2% spoke Asian or Pacific Islander languages. Of those aged 25 or older, 76.1% were high school graduates and 23.5% had a bachelor's degree.

=== Income and poverty ===
The median household income in 2023 was $61,071, and the per capita income was $29,141. About 22.0% of families and 23.4% of the population were below the poverty line.

=== Historical demographics ===
In 1920, Armenians comprised 65% of the population of Fowler, with 1,000 Armenian residents out of a total population of 1,528.

== Notable people ==
- Marvin R. Baxter, Associate Justice of the Supreme Court of California
- Ernest A. Bedrosian, founder of the Raisin Bargaining Association (RBA), 1967. His dynamic organizational skill brought together over 1,000 raisin growers to form the largest agricultural bargaining association in America. The RBA's bargaining power was instrumental in increasing raisin grower returns from $180/ton to a recent record of $1,900/ton with a corresponding record increase for raisin grower land values.
- Jerry Dyer, Mayor of Fresno
- Richard Hagopian, American Oriental-style oud player and traditional Armenian musician.
- Victor Davis Hanson, classicist, historian, and political writer.
- Douglas Jamgochian, professional dancer who has worked on both stage and screen.
- Herman A. Lawson, highly decorated U.S. Army Air Force/U.S. Air Force officer, combat fighter pilot, and combat flight instructor with the 332nd Fighter Group's 99th Pursuit Squadron, best known as the Tuskegee Airmen or "Red Tails". He was one of 1,007 documented Tuskegee Airmen Pilots.
