= Kuma\War =

2004 video game

- Developer: Kuma Reality Games
- Publisher: Kuma Reality Games
- Engine: Source
- Platform: Windows
- Release: March 2004
- Genre: Shooter
- Modes: Single-player, multiplayer

Kuma\War (stylized as KUMA\WAR) is a tactical shooter game created by developer Kuma Reality Games. Kuma\War is an episodic game that re-creates real-world conflicts in video game format using information culled from news accounts, military experts, Department of Defense records and original research. Episodes consist of a playable mission, extensive background text, and often include interviews with military experts, soldiers and other actual participants in the events described.

Kuma\War is notable for its current free-to-play ad-supported business model, its ardent Iraqi fan base and continuous updates, delivering new episodes each month. Every episode from the collection of Kuma\War missions can be downloaded for free and played as a single-player first-person shooter. Popular past missions can also be played as a free online multiplayer experience.

== History ==
In July 2006, Kuma\War 2 was released, featuring improved graphics (based on the Source engine) and an expanded online multiplayer environment. The first mission re-creates the killing of Abu Musab al-Zarqawi.

=== Game missions ===
First released in 2004, Kuma\War now features over 120 missions, known as "episodes". While many episodes are drawn from the Iraq War, Kuma has also re-created events from Afghanistan, Iran, South Korea (a 1996 raid by North Korean commandos), Vietnam (John Kerry's Silver Star mission), Sierra Leone (Operation Barras) and Mexico (a battle between Mexican soldiers and drug cartels).

The first mission of the game (named "Uday and Qusay's Last Stand") is the battle in which the two sons of Saddam Hussein, Uday and Qusay, are killed. The attack is described as "a turning point in Operation Iraqi Freedom" and "a milestone in the war on terror". Other significant episodes include "John Kerry’s Silver Star", "Fallujah: Operation al Fajr", and "Osama 2001: Tora Bora." The main distinguishing feature in Kuma\War is its extensive background information for each mission, which includes satellite photos, original articles and a multimedia library.

=== Osama bin Laden and the end of Kuma\War ===
In May 2011, Kuma Games released Kuma\War 2's 107th mission: a recreation of the death of Osama bin Laden. Later in October 2011, Kuma Games released the 108th, and as of 2013, final mission for Kuma/War 2, a recreation of the Fall of Sirte and the death of Muammar Gaddafi.

== Gameplay ==
The original Kuma\War is a military third-person shooter utilizing the N-Fusion game engine. A first person perspective was also available for players to choose. A variety of weapons are available and depending on the mission the player either played solo or participated in squad based play. The game had 74 episodes produced for it before the developer moved on to its sequel Kuma\War 2.

Kuma\War 2 is a military first-person shooter that utilizes Valve's Source Engine. Both Kuma\War 1 and Kuma\War 2 features third and first person views. Kuma\War 2 features similar gameplay themes to the original Kuma\War such as single, multiplayer, and co-op maps. Thus far 125 episodes have been produced continuing the numbering from Kuma\War 1.

== Reception ==
GameDaily gave a rating of 3.5 out of 5 and called it a pretty enjoyable game.

== See also ==
- List of free first-person shooters
- First-person shooters
