= Richard G. Candelaria =

American flying ace (1922–2024)

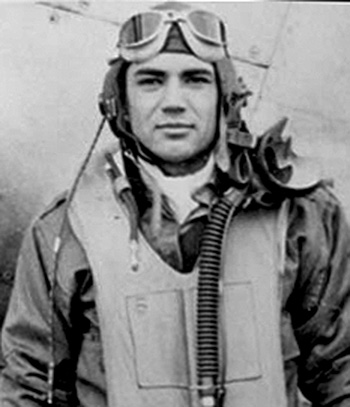
- Born: July 14, 1922; El Paso, Texas, U.S.
- Died: August 30, 2024 (aged 102)
- Military career
- Allegiance: United States of America
- Branch: United States Army Air Forces; United States Air Force Reserve; California Air National Guard
- Service years: 1943–1964
- Rank: Colonel
- Unit: 479th Fighter Group
- Commands: 8195th Replacement Training Squadron
- Conflicts: World War II
- Awards: Silver Star; Distinguished Flying Cross; Purple Heart; Air Medal (8)

Richard G. Candelaria (July 14, 1922 – August 30, 2024) was an American flying ace in the 479th Fighter Group during World War II, who was credited with six aerial victories, including an Me 262.

== Early life ==
Candelaria was born in El Paso, Texas on July 14, 1922. The only child in his family, Candelaria was seven years old when his father died. His maternal grandmother, two aunts and an uncle then moved to Southern California to live with the family, where they lived comfortably during the Great Depression.

After graduating from Theodore Roosevelt High School in Fresno in February 1939, Candelaria passed preliminary entrance exams for the Air Force flying program. He began his seven-month studies at the University of Southern California to meet the two-year college requirement within the U.S. Army Air Corps. During this time, he maintained his interest in aviation by working part time at Miller Dial & Instrument, a company that produced instrument dials for aircraft.

== Military career ==
During World War II, Candelaria enlisted in the Aviation Cadet Program of the U.S. Army Air Forces on January 22, 1943. He began his training at airfields in California and Arizona. In January 1944, he graduated as a second lieutenant and received his wings. Following completion of flight training, Candelaria was selected and assigned to Williams and Luke Fields in Arizona, as a flight instructor, teaching advanced pilot instrument flying and gunnery.

=== World War II ===
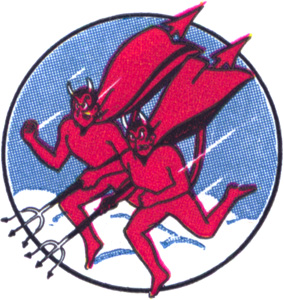
434th Fighter Squadron

In May 1944, Candelaria registered to be assigned in combat operations. After completing P-51 Mustang transition training, he was assigned with the 435th Fighter Squadron of the 479th Fighter Group in England in September 1944. Based at RAF Wattisham, he flew P-38 Lightnings and P-51 Mustangs in bomber escort missions.

On December 5, he was flying as wingman to the flight leader on a mission northwest of Berlin when his squadron encountered 80 Focke-Wulf Fw 190s that were attempting to attack a formation of B-24 Liberators. The P-51s attacked with Candelaria shooting down two Fw 190s, resulting the remaining Fw 190s to scatter and retreat.

His biggest day came on April 7, 1945. Candelaria was taxiing for takeoff as a leader of his section when he got a call from the control tower informing him that his rear tire was flat. The ground crew quickly appeared to put on a new one, but by the time he got airborne the rest of the flight element had departed earlier to rendezvous with the B-24s.

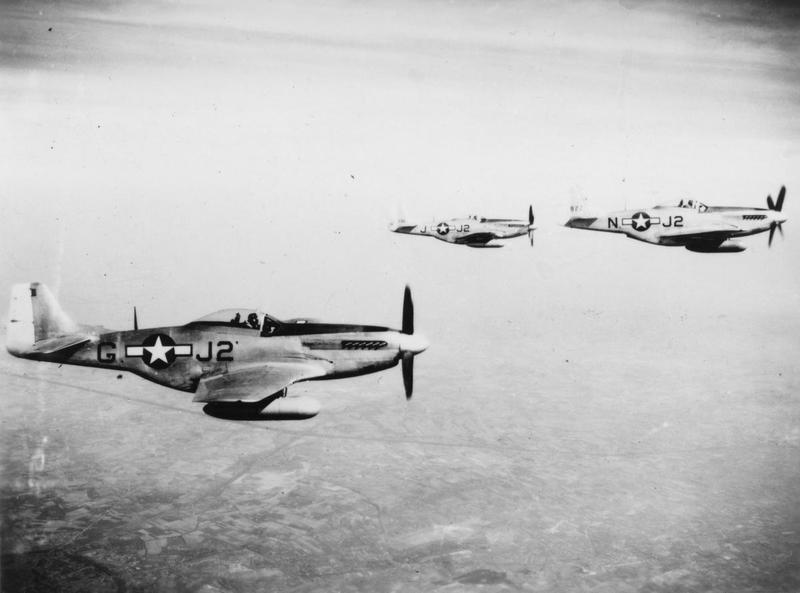
479th FG P-51s fly in combat formation

As he arrived early over the target by taking shortcuts, he noticed two jet-powered Messerschmitt Me 262s waiting to attack the B-24s. Candelaria headed close to the Me 262s, and as the jets dipped to go below him, he dropped his fuel tanks, in an attempt to hit one of them. This didn't happen, but the maneuver managed to distract the two German pilots. As they began to circle, Candelaria pulled his P-51 to get inside their wide turn. He managed to fire at one of the Me 262s, and it began to smoke and roll over. The other Me 262 attempted to attack Candelaria, but decided to break off and head away.

Just after his encounter with the Me 262s ended, Candelaria noticed several Messerschmitt Bf 109s attempting to attack the B-24s. He radioed his squadron for aid and shot down the lead Bf 109. Candelaria went after the remaining German fighters and shot down three more of them before the rest of his squadron finally arrived, resulting in the remaining Bf 109s to retreat.

==== Shot down and evasion ====
On April 13, 1945, after a mission over East Prussia, Candelaria attacked enemy aircraft at an airfield in Rostock. After attacking the airfield in first pass, he decided to attack the airfield again in a second pass. But by this time, the German anti-aircraft personnel managed to shoot at him. As a result, his aircraft's engine caught fire and Candelaria steered his aircraft to the Elbe River to head towards Allied-controlled territory. He then bailed out of his P-51.

After several days on the run, he was moving through an open field to get from one forested area to hide in another when two German soldiers appeared. Candelaria attempted to surrender to them by waving his white pilot scarf, but the Germans ignored his effort to surrender and opened fire with their rifles. In response, Candelaria pulled out his pistol, and shot and killed both the soldiers.

After another two days, weakened from hunger and exposure, Candelaria found himself near a settlement and hid in a vacant cabin. But the locals had seen him, and some of them later approached the cabin along with a German army sergeant. They wanted to lynch him on the spot because their village had been attacked by Allied aircraft. But the sergeant held them off until an officer arrived and escorted Candelaria away from the mob.

Candelaria was taken to a Luftwaffe command center, where other Allied pilots were also being held. After several weeks of captivity, Candelaria and two British officers managed to overpower a German captain inspecting the farmhouse where they were being kept. They hijacked a German automobile, taking a German captain hostage to reach Allied lines. Soon they had crossed over into Belgium, where they were surprised to learn that the war in Europe was over. Candelaria made it safely back to his squadron, and eventually back to the United States.

During World War II, Candelaria was credited with destroying six enemy aircraft in aerial combat plus one probable. During his time with the 479th FG, he flew P-51K named "My Pride and Joy".

=== Post war ===
Candelaria left active duty on May 1, 1946, and served in the Air Force Reserve until joining the California Air National Guard (CA ANG) on April 27, 1950. He served in a variety of command and staff positions over the next ten years, including commanding 8195th Replacement Training Squadron at Van Nuys Air National Guard Base from February 1955 to June 1957. He transferred to the Air Force Reserve on October 20, 1960, and retired on June 15, 1964, at the rank of colonel.

== Later life and death ==
Candelaria married Betty Jean Landreth in 1953. The couple had two daughters.

After his retirement from military, Candelaria had a successful business career and started a series of manufacturing businesses. He worked in management and administration.

In 2007, Candelaria appeared on an episode of the History Channel series Dogfights. In the episode titled 'P-51 Mustang' features his April 7, 1945 mission. The episode was the eleventh episode of the second season of the series, which recreated historical air combat campaigns using modern computer graphics.

Candelaria died on August 30, 2024, at the age of 102.

== Aerial victory credits ==
Date	Location	Air/Ground	Number	Type	Status
5 December 1944	Berlin, Germany	Air	2	Fw 190	Destroyed
7 April 1945	Lüneburg, Germany	Air	1	Me 262	Probable
7 April 1945	Lüneburg, Germany	Air	4	Bf 109	Destroyed

SOURCES: Air Force Historical Study 85: USAF Credits for the Destruction of Enemy Aircraft, World War II

== Awards and decorations ==
His awards include:

USAF Command Pilot Badge
Silver Star
Distinguished Flying Cross
Purple Heart
Air Medal with one silver and two bronze oak leaf clusters
Air Force Presidential Unit Citation with two bronze oak leaf clusters
Prisoner of War Medal
Army Good Conduct Medal
American Campaign Medal
European-African-Middle Eastern Campaign Medal with four bronze campaign stars
World War II Victory Medal
Armed Forces Reserve Medal with bronze hourglass device
Air Force Longevity Service Award with four bronze oak leaf clusters
French Legion of Honour (Chevalier)

=== Silver Star citation ===
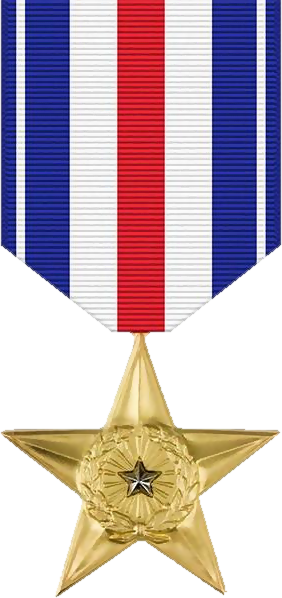

For gallantry in action while escorting heavy bombers over Germany, 7 April 1945. When adverse weather caused Captain Candelaria to become separated from his Squadron, he continued on alone to rendezvous with the bombers. Observing two (2) ME-262 jets attacking the formation, he intercepted and dispersed them, probably destroying one (1) of the fighters. Still alone, and completely ignoring the odds and personal danger, Captain Candelaria attacked approximately fifteen (15) hostile fighters. Selecting the lead plane for his initial target, he shot it down in flames and then gallantly engaged the remaining aircraft until assistance arrived. Captain Candelaria's courage, tenacity of purpose, and determination to destroy the enemy at any cost are borne out by the fact that during this action he shot down four (4) ME-109's, thus preventing serious damage being inflicted on the bombers.
