= Wendell O. Pruitt =

United States Army Air Forces officer

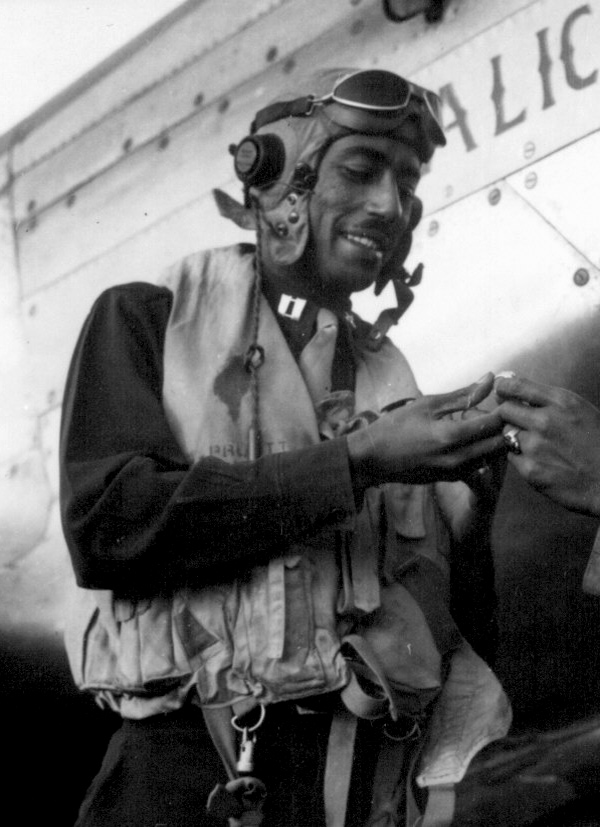
- Born: June 20, 1920; St. Louis, Missouri
- Died: April 15, 1945 (aged 24); Tuskegee, Alabama
- Military career
- Allegiance: United States
- Branch: United States Army
- Service years: 1942–1945
- Rank: Captain
- Unit: 332nd Fighter Group
- Awards: Distinguished Flying Cross

Wendell Oliver Pruitt (June 20, 1920 – April 15, 1945) was an American military pilot and Tuskegee Airman originally from St. Louis, Missouri. He was killed during a training exercise in 1945. After his death, his name, along with that of William L. Igoe, was given to the Pruitt–Igoe public housing complex in St. Louis.

== Biography ==
Pruitt grew up in St. Louis, Missouri, as the youngest of ten children to Elijah and Melanie Pruitt and attended Sumner High School. He then furthered his education at Lincoln University in Jefferson City, Missouri, becoming a member of Alpha Phi Alpha fraternity. Pruitt was a member of St. Elizabeth Catholic Church.

== Military career ==
Pruitt, already a licensed pilot, enlisted in the Army Air Corps Cadet Flying Program in Tuskegee, Alabama, eventually graduating and being commissioned as a second lieutenant on December 11, 1942.

After graduating from flight school at Tuskegee, Pruitt was assigned to the 332nd Fighter Group, then stationed in Michigan. The 332nd was transferred to the Mediterranean theater in late 1943 where Pruitt flew the P-47 Thunderbolt.

In June 1944, Pruitt and his occasional wingman, 1st Lt. Gwynne Walker Peirson, landed direct hits on an enemy destroyer that sank at Trieste harbor in northern Italy. He received the Distinguished Flying Cross for this action. Thereafter, the 332nd flew the P-51 Mustang as their primary fighter aircraft.

Pruitt teamed with Lee Archer to form the famed "Gruesome Twosome", the most successful pair of Tuskegee pilots in terms of air victories. The "Gruesome Twosome" are featured in a History Channel show entitled Dogfights: Tuskegee Airmen. Pruitt flew seventy combat missions, was credited with three enemy kills, and reached the rank of captain.

== Death ==
Pruitt was killed, along with a student pilot, during a training exercise in Tuskegee, Alabama, on April 15, 1945.

== Honors ==
=== U.S. decorations and badges ===
Distinguished Flying Cross (with 7 Oak Leaf Clusters)

=== Things named for Pruitt ===
- The Pruitt–Igoe Housing Project (along with William L. Igoe)
- A Martian rock studied by the Mars Spirit Rover
- A St. Louis elementary school and a military school
- "Wendell O. Pruitt Day" in the City of St. Louis, Missouri (December 12, 1944)

== See also ==
- Dogfights (TV series)
- Executive Order 9981
- List of Tuskegee Airmen
- Military history of African Americans
- The Tuskegee Airmen (movie)
