= Herman A. Lawson =

American soldier and politician (1916–1995)

Major Herman A. Lawson
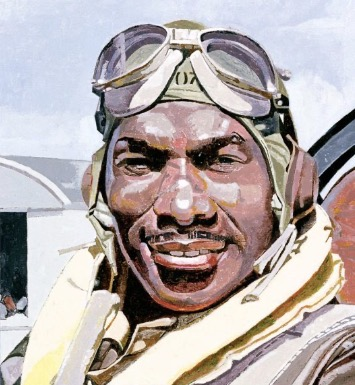
- 1988 portrait of Lawson by Roy E. LaGrone
- Born: Herman Albert Lawson; December 4, 1916; Fowler, California, U.S.
- Died: April 9, 1995 (aged 78); Sacramento, California, U.S.
- Military career
- Allegiance: United States
- Branch: United States Army Air Forces
- Rank: Major
- Nickname: Ace
- Units: 99th Pursuit Squadron, 332nd Division, Tuskegee Airmen
- Conflicts: World War II
- Awards: Congressional Gold Medal; Distinguished Service Cross; Silver Star

Herman Albert "Ace" Lawson (December 24, 1916 – May 9, 1995) was an American soldier and politician. He served with the Tuskegee Airmen during World War II, and later served as a city councilman of Sacramento, California.

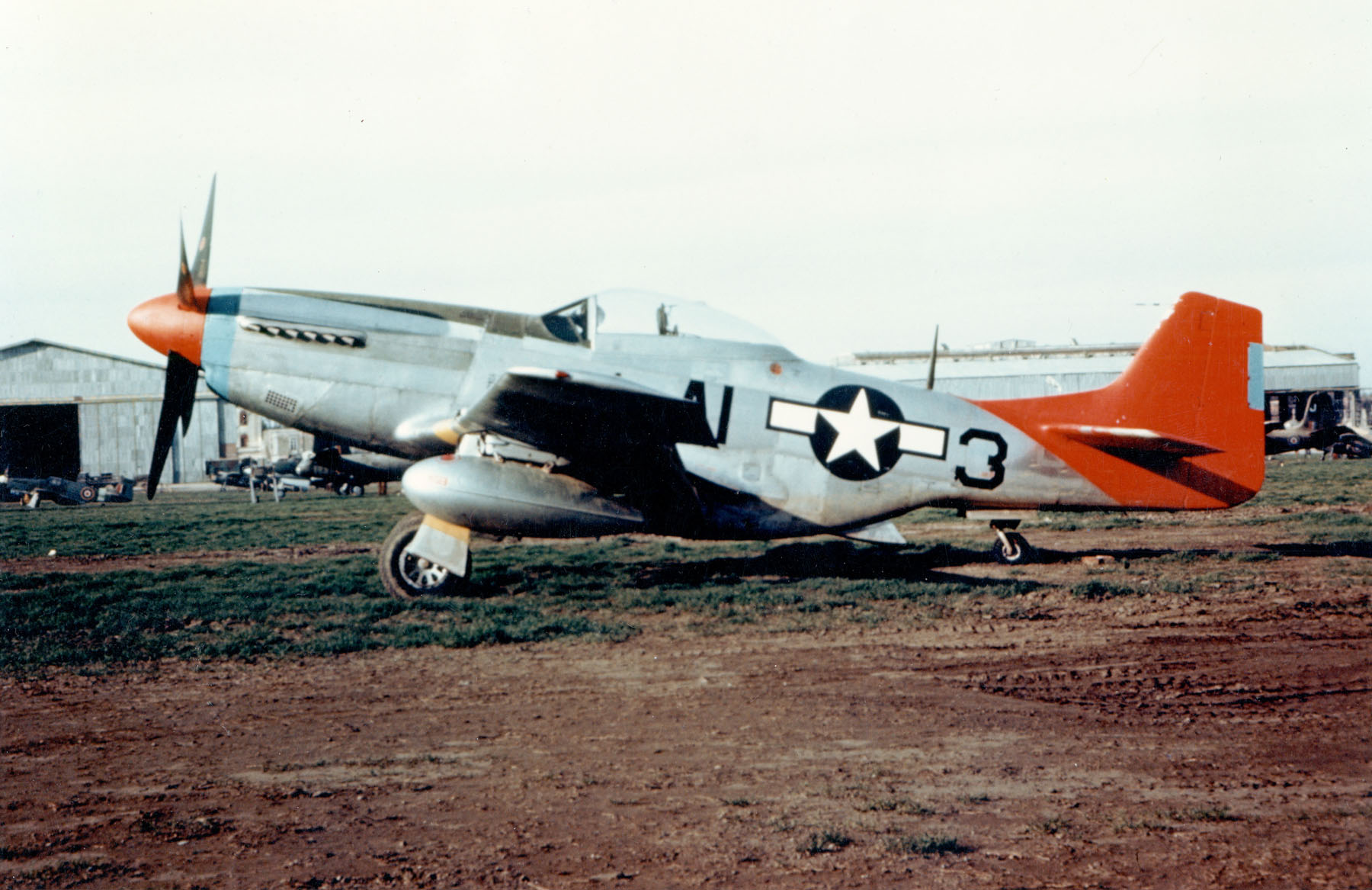
The Tuskegee Airmen's aircraft had distinctive markings that led to the name, "Red Tails." (Note: The red markings that distinguished the Tuskegee Airmen included red bands on the noses of P-51s as well as a red rudder; their P-51B and D Mustangs flew with similar color schemes, with red propeller spinners, yellow wing bands and all-red tail surfaces.)

== Early life ==
Lawson was born on December 24, 1916, in Fowler, California. He attended Marysville High School, where he garnered the nickname "Ace" as its star football player.

In the late 1930s after a year in the Civilian Conservation Corp, Lawson attended Fresno State University, one of three African American students there at the time. While at Fresno, Lawson became the first African American to play four years of football there. He also served as the Fresno Football team's official photographer. A prolific athlete, Lawson was also Fresno's collegiate Light Heavyweight Boxing champion, a letterman in Basketball, and a letterman in track and field.

At Fresno, Lawson met and later married fellow student Pearl Lee Johnson Lawson, an aspiring teacher. The Lawsons had seven children: Betty Lawson Davis, Patricia Lawson, Gloria Lawson-Riddle, Yvonne Lawson, Thomas Lawson, Tracey Lawson, and a child who died as an infant.

After riding on an aircraft with a pilot friend, Lawson became interested in becoming a pilot and joining the U.S. Army Air Corps. Lawson became one of the first African Americans in Northern California to earn a Private Pilot license. He also built his own functioning gliders.

== Military service ==
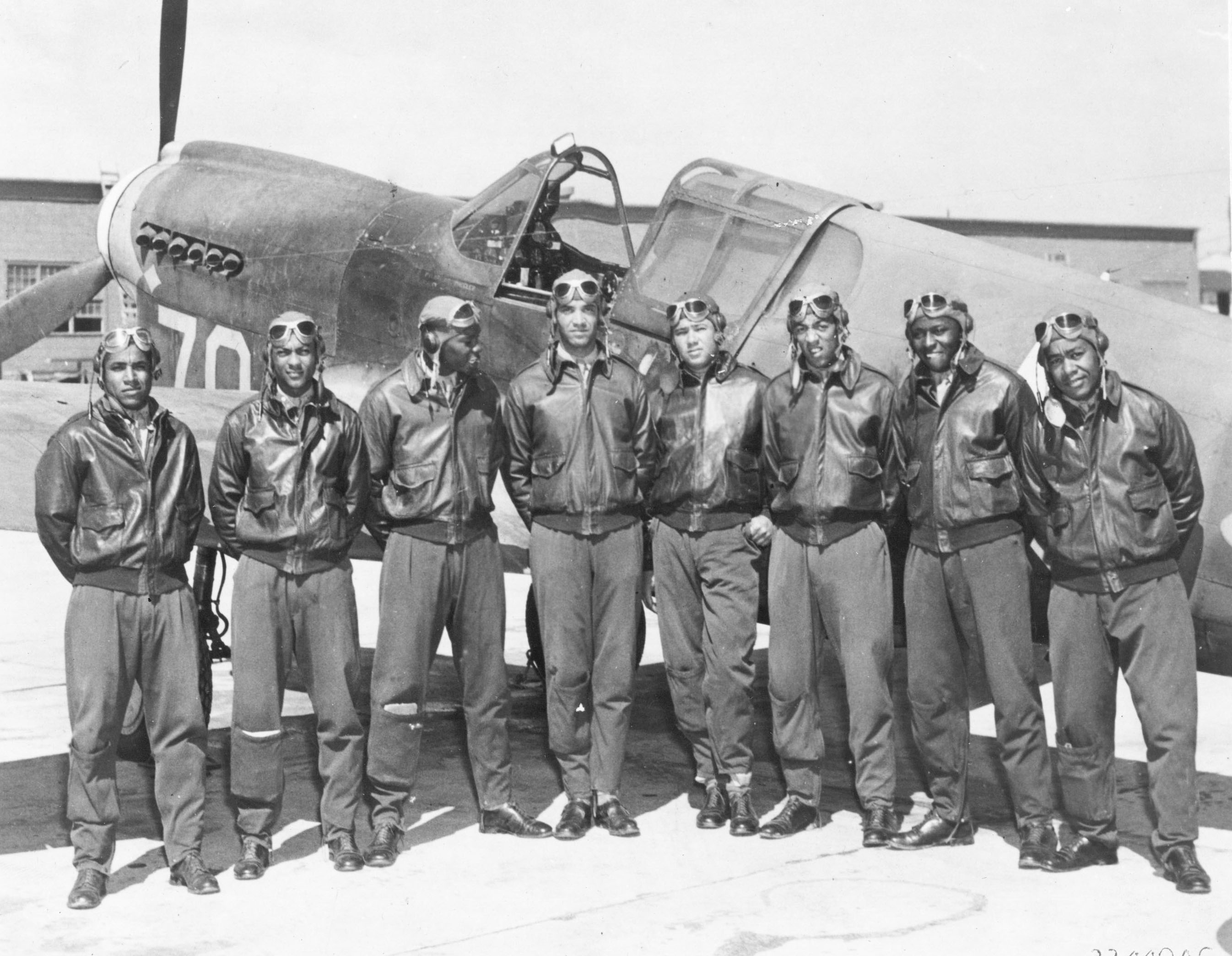
Class 42-I Left to right: Nathaniel M. Hill, Marshall S. Cabiness, Herman A. Lawson, William T. Mattison, John A. Gibson, Elwood T Driver, Price D. Rice, Andrew D. Turner

While a student at Fresno State University, Lawson and a group of friends attended an interview event with the U.S. Army Air Corps. After an hour's wait, a U.S. Army Air Corps Colonel and a Lieutenant dismissed Lawson, telling him that the military had no interest in recruiting "night fighters," a vague but albeit stark reference to Lawson's race. Undeterred, Lawson wrote a letter to Congress and a separate letter to President Franklin D. Roosevelt's wife, First Lady Eleanor Roosevelt, who had been sympathetic to African American causes. After receiving a U.S. Army Air Corps flight school acceptance letter in the U.S. mails, Lawson rushed to a local train station en route to Tuskegee Army Air Field in Tuskegee, Alabama, abandoning his car storing $1,000 worth of camera equipment in its trunk.

Lawson became one of second group of 99th Fighter Squadron replacement pilots. Lawson and several other 99th Fighter Squadron pilots were sent to Brazil in error.

During World War II, Lawson earned the Silver Star, the Distinguished Service Cross, and the Distinguished Flying Cross for aerial action on October 4, 1944. Using P-40s, P-47s, and P-51s, Lawson flew 133 missions in World War II's European Theater including Greece, Bulgaria, Germany, Austria, France, Poland, Yugoslavia, and Czechoslovakia. He survived two engine failures in P-40s; one of his P-40s landed him in the Mediterranean. Lawson later flew another P-40 named "Ace of Pearls", and another P-51B named "Ace of Pearls", both named in honor of Lawson's wife Pearl.

On September 22, 1944, as the 99th Fighter Squadron's flight leader, Lawson and his squadron escorted 5th Bomb Wing B-17 bombers on a mission to destroy an Allach BMW Engine Works plant in Munich, Germany. One of Lawson's squadron pilots, Flight Officer Leonard R. Willette, radioed that he needed to bail from his aircraft as a result of low oil pressure. Though Lawson instructed Willette to change radio channels and head back to base, Willette, unable to bail, crashed. The Germans recovered Willette's body, returning it through the Red Cross.

After his tour in Europe ended, Lawson returned to Tuskegee as a flight instructor. After World War II, Lawson remained in the military, retiring after 25 years with the rank of Major.

=== Service awards ===
- Congressional Gold Medal (2007)
- Distinguished Service Cross
- Silver Star

== Politics and later life ==
After leaving the military, Lawson worked twenty years for the State of California. In 1973, Lawson was appointed to the Sacramento, California City Council as District 2 Councilman, completing the remainder of then-recently deceased District 2 council member Rosenwald Robertson's term until 1975. He represented northeastern neighborhoods of Sacramento.

Lawson had four children. He died on May 9, 1995, aged 78, in Sacramento.

== See also ==
- List of Tuskegee Airmen Cadet Pilot Graduation Classes
- List of Tuskegee Airmen
- Military history of African Americans
