= Kuma Reality Games =

American video game developer

Kuma Games
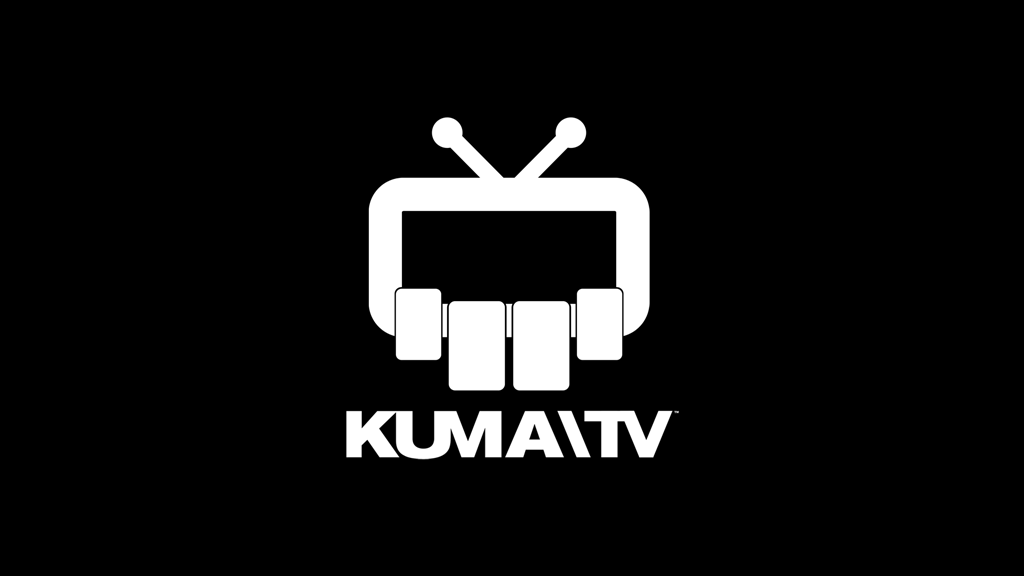
- Type: Video game developer
- Industry: Video games
- Founded: 2002
- Headquarters: New York, New York, U.S.
- Website: kumawar.org

Kuma Games is an American video game developer, specializing in developing free episodic and first-person shooters (FPS) since 2004. The company has also created a number of machinima movies for their games, particularly The Dinohunters.

Kuma Games has partnered with brands and networks throughout its history to re-imagine TV storytelling by integrating high quality, immersive video game experiences into TV entertainment. such as The History Channel's Dogfights and ShootOut! series, as well as The Kill Point for Spike TV.

Kuma, LLC has its headquarters in Midtown Manhattan, New York City.

== KUMA\TV Gameisodes ==
KUMA has embarked on revolutionizing the way people play games and watch TV with TV games. Players can use both their smartphones and smart TVs to play games.

- Space Epic Untitled: Greenlit by the Steam community, Space Epic Untitled is a new style of TV entertainment built on a game engine in which fans play, star in, and help create TV shows using their phone and smart TV devices together. The game is due out Fall 2017 for iOS and Android mobile devices, Apple TV, AmazonFireTV, and Steam for PC.
- Infinite Overdrive: A fast-paced, combat racer filled with robotic hordes, boss fights and insane upgradable weapons.
- Evil Magic Finger: Evil Magic Finger is an online card game that fuses elements of the classic game, “War”, with strategy, memory, chance and (evil) magic!
- Ice Road Truckers: A free, infinite runner based on the History Channel's TV show.

== Kuma Reality Gameisodes ==
Kuma Reality Games produced free episodic PC game titles until 2013. While Kuma ceased production of the titles below, the games are still available for free download. Most of the games are built on Valve's Source engine.

- Kuma\War The second version of Kuma\War Classics is a first and third-person shooter, taking information from military operations. Kuma Games is known as UE9 (Unidad Especial 9) in Latin America. In 2011, KUMA released the last two episodes ofKUMA\War: The Death of Osama bin Laden. and The Fall of Sirte: Gaddafi's Last Stand
- I, Predator: I, Predator is a survival game based on Discovery's TV channel Animal Planet.The game has three playable episodes.
- Dogfights: Dogfights is a game that was produced in conjunction with The History Channel program of the same name. The games for this title are based on the show's Season 2 World War II episodes.
- WWII\Vietnam: WWII\Vietnam is a game that was produced in conjunction with The History Channel program ShootOut!. The episodic games for this title are based on the actual ShootOut! episodes that air on The History Channel. Some of the battles recreated include Iwo Jima, The Tet Offensive, The Battle of the Bulge, and an episode on the Vietcong attacking of the US Embassy in Vietnam.
- The DinoHunters: The story of the Dinohunters is centered around a fictitious reality show on the Total Hunting Channel. The producers send a crew of washed up celebrities into the past to hunt dinosaurs for sport and big ratings. The crew consists of Australian stuntman and actor Roger Wallaby, country singer Harlan Davis, Brooklyn native Shaw Jefferson, and their sexpot producer Candace "Candy" Spencer. It was released on April 24, 2006.
- Mobsters: Mobsters is a free episodic first-person shooter based on The Biography Channel's program Mobsters. Each game episode mirrors events from each episode of the series; where police try to negotiate the safe release of hostages in a bank robbery gone awry. The game was formerly based on Spike TV's program The Kill Point.
- WWII Experience: WWII Experience is a game based on actual World War II missions. The missions cover land, sea, and air.
- National Blood Sport: A football-style shooter taking place in Nazi-occupied America.
- Street Soccer: Street Soccer is a third-person soccer game with melee combat & a wall-walking ability.
- Kuma War Classics: This game takes information and strategic data from recent military operations and attempts to recreate the war scenario as it happened. The missions for Kuma War Classics are missions 1-74. The missions after that are Kuma War missions. This game has come under much praise and criticism for the role it plays in reproducing recent battles. Kuma War now has an option to play in first-person, rather than the default third-person.

== Other projects ==
- Free Energy Game: An informative and fun approach to energy management, created by Stanford University, KUMA Games, and Seriosity

== See also ==
- Episodic games
- List of free first-person shooters
