= Clarence D. Lester =

Tuskegee Airman (1923–1986)

Colonel Clarence D. Lester
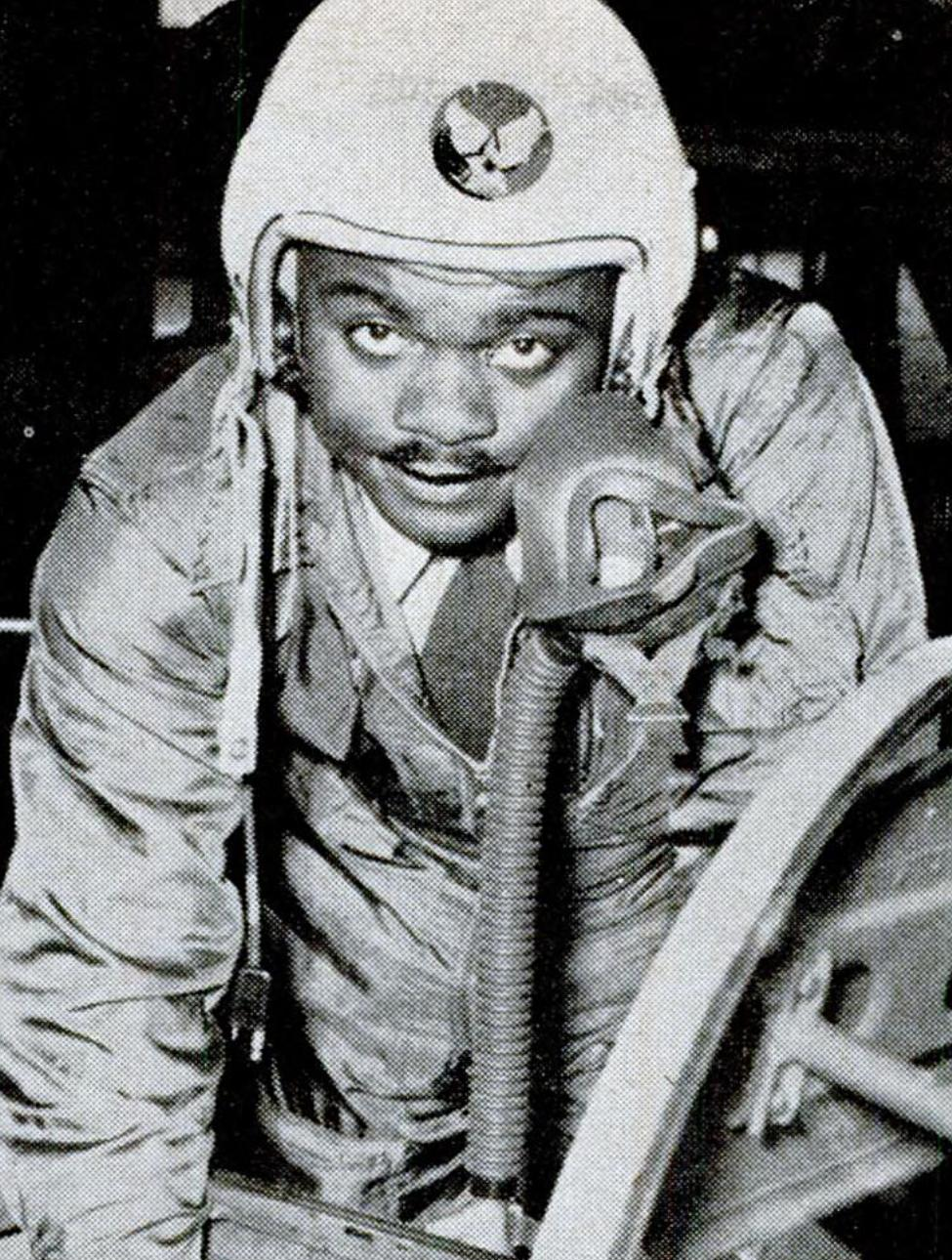
- Colonel Lester c. 1951
- Born: February 23, 1923; Richmond, Richmond City, Virginia, US
- Died: March 17, 1986 (aged 63); Washington, District of Columbia, District Of Columbia, US
- Burial place: Arlington National Cemetery, Virginia, US
- Military career
- Allegiance: United States of America
- Branch: United States Army Air Forces
- Service years: 1942–1969
- Rank: Colonel
- Nickname: Lucky
- Units: 322nd Fighter Squadron; Tuskegee Airmen
- Conflicts: World War II
- Awards: Congressional Gold Medal awarded to the Tuskegee Airmen

Clarence D. "Lucky" Lester (February 23, 1923 – March 17, 1986) was an American fighter pilot who served in the 332nd Fighter Group, commonly known as the Tuskegee Airmen, during World War II. He was one of the first African-American military aviators in the United States Army Air Corps, the United States Army Air Forces and later the United States Air Force.

Lester best known as one of two Tuskegee pilots who shot down three Focke-Wulf Fw 190 or Messerschmitt Bf 109 on a single mission; the other pilot was Captain Joseph Elsberry. Lester flew a P-51 Mustang nicknamed "Miss Pelt." He and Elsberry are two of only four Tuskegee Airmen to have earned three aerial victories in a single day of combat.

== Early life, family, education ==
Lester was born on February 23, 1923, in Richmond, Virginia. Raised in Chicago, Illinois, Lester attended West Virginia State College where he was a star football player. On May 17, 1946, Lester was initiated as a fraternity brother of Kappa Alpha Psi, Iota chapter at the University of Chicago.

== World War II ==
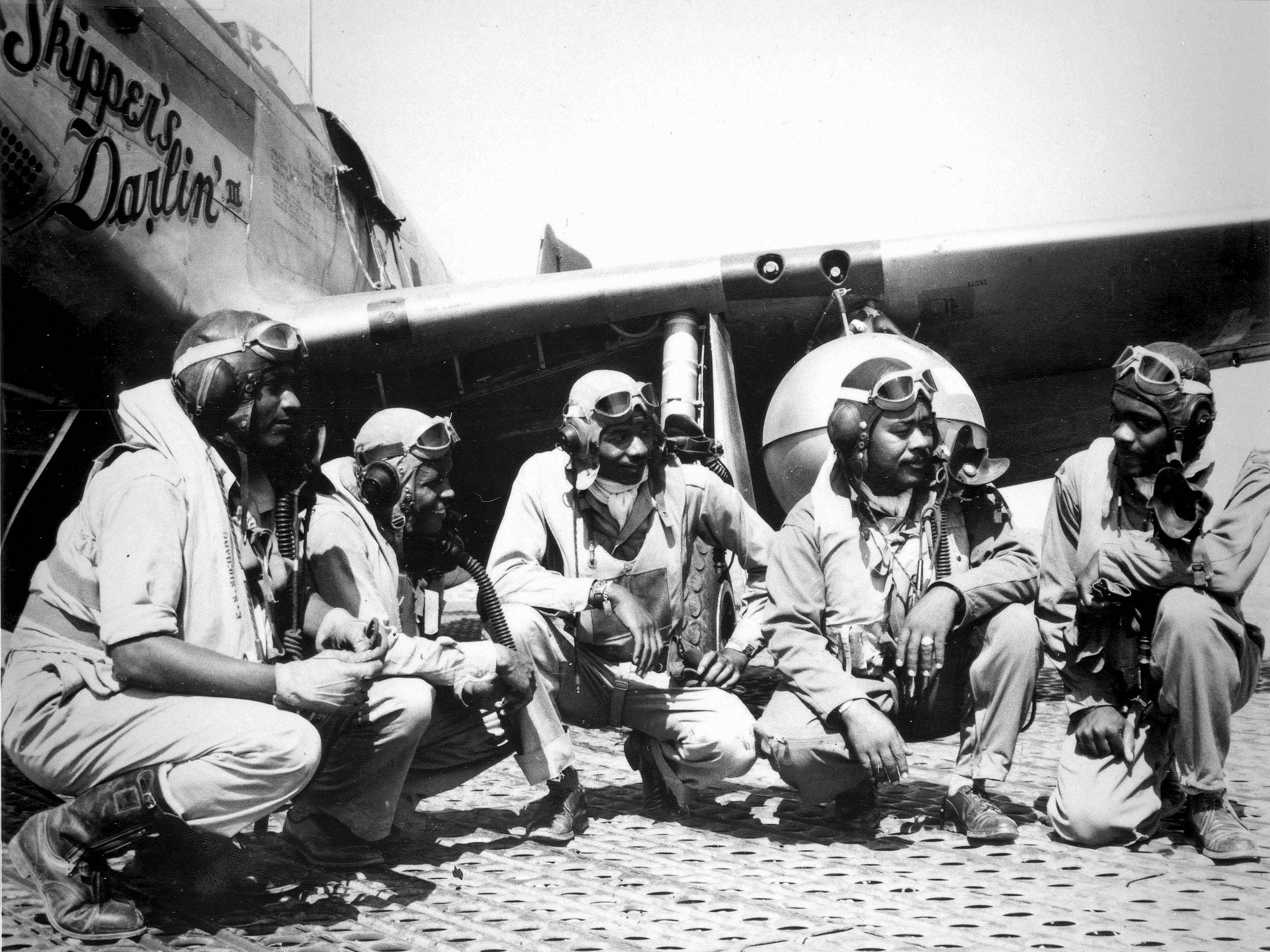
332nd Fighter Group at Ramitelli, Italy., from left to right, Lt. Dempsey W. Morgan, Lt. Carroll S. Woods, Lt. Robert H. Nelson, Jr., Capt. Andrew D. Turner, and Lt. Clarence P. Lester. (U.S. Air Force photo)

The Tuskegee Airmen is the popular name of a group of African-American military pilots (fighter and bomber) who fought in World War II. They formed the 332nd Fighter Group and the 477th Bombardment Group of the United States Army Air Forces. Lester recalled that "Being a black pilot in the 1940s was like being a pro athlete today ... We knew we were special, that we would have to prove something. This was the first chance blacks had had outside of working in the kitchen or the possibility [sic] of being a truck driver." White pilots would fly around 50 combat missions but because there were no replacements, black pilots of the Tuskegee Airmen flew around 70 missions. During the war he flew over 90 combat missions.

Overall, Lester was one of only nine Tuskegee Airmen pilots with at least three confirmed kills during World War II.

== Awards ==
- Congressional Gold Medal awarded to the Tuskegee Airmen in 2006

== After WWII ==
While flying an F-84E Thunderjet it experienced mechanical failure and exploded into flames forcing Lester to yank his ejection seat and parachute from the inflamed jet, which made him "only the sixth pilot ever to use the ejection method." Later in his career he also worked with the infamous "Whiz kids" that Robert McNamara assembled at the Office of the Secretary of Defense. In 1969 Lester retired as a full colonel and was then appointed as associate director of social services in Rockville, Maryland.

In 1969, Lester, along with three Department of Defense analysts, also founded the company which would later become ICF International following his military service. The original Inner City Fund was a venture capital firm aimed at supporting minority-owned businesses to achieve government contracts. In the early 1970s the company transitioned toward a consulting model and has now achieved over $1.5B in annual revenue.

== Personal life ==
Lester was Catholic.

== Bibliography ==
Notes

References

- Campbell, Crispin Y. (February 23, 1983). "Black Pilots Of '40s Charted New Horizons". The Washington Post.
- Gubert, Betty Kaplan; Sawyer, Miriam; Fannin, Caroline M (2002). Distinguished African Americans in Aviation and Space Science. Greenwood Publishing Group. ISBN 9781573562461. - Total pages: 319
- Hardesty, Von (2008). Black Wings: Courageous Stories of African Americans in Aviation and Space History. HarperCollins. ISBN 9780061261381. - Total pages: 180
- Homan, Lynn; Reilly, Thomas (2001). Black Knights: The Story of the Tuskegee Airmen. Pelican Publishing Company. ISBN 9781455601257. - Total pages: 336
- Nalty, Bernard C. (1989). Strength for the Fight: A History of Black Americans in the Military. Simon & Schuster. ISBN 9780029224113. - Total pages: 424
- United States Air Force (February 8, 2012). "Tuskegee Airman gives account of 'lucky' day". United States Air Force.
- Viera, Bené (April 12, 2018). "This black fighter pilot broke all kinds of records. He doesn't even have a Wikipedia page". timeline.com.
