= Robert Duncan (pilot) =

American World War II flying ace

- Born: Robert Wayne Duncan; 20 December 1920; Marion, Illinois, US
- Died: 12 October 2013 (aged 92); Marion, Illinois, US
- Military career
- Allegiance: United States
- Branch: United States Navy
- Service years: 1942–1966
- Rank: Captain
- Conflicts: Pacific War; Korean War
- Awards: Navy Cross; Distinguished Flying Cross (2); Air Medal (8)

Robert Wayne Duncan (20 December 1920 – 12 October 2013) was an American flying ace in the Pacific theatre of World War II. Duncan was the first person to shoot down a Mitsubishi A6M Zero while flying a Grumman F6F Hellcat. He was in the U.S. Navy from 1942 to 1966, retiring with the rank of Captain after having flown more than 100 combat missions in World War II and the Korean War.

== World War II ==
Duncan scored his first and second aerial victories in the Hellcat on 5 October 1943, the second being Japanese flying ace Warrant Officer Toshiyuki Sueda, who previously had downed nine American aircraft, most of which were older Grumman F4F Wildcats. Sueda had previously lured Wildcats into a trap by flying into a vertical loop and waiting for them to stall out before diving down to shoot them. However, this same technique failed to cause the similar looking but improved Hellcat to stall and Duncan was able to shoot his opponent down. Duncan was unaware for a while that his second kill was a flying ace, and not a rookie pilot because the dogfight did not prove to be particularly difficult.

He became the most successful pilot in his squadron, totaling seven victories, all Mitsubishi Zeros. His aviation accomplishments in 1944, when he became the first flying ace in his squadron after he scored his fifth victory in Operation Hailstone, were documented on the History Channel.

== Subsequent Navy service ==
During the Korean War, Duncan was stationed to a jet squadron on the USS Boxer, and cumulatively (with WWII) flew 100 combat missions in a Grumman F9F Panther. He retired from the Navy in 1966 with the rank of captain, his final post being commander of the 8th Navy Recruiting Area at San Francisco. Duncan was awarded the Navy Cross in 2003, decades after Admiral Chester W. Nimitz had recommended him for the award.

== Post-Navy ==
Following his retirement from the Navy, Duncan was the chairman of the board of the Williamson County Regional Airport Authority.

He died in his birthplace of Marion, Illinois, at age 92.
