= Sidney Brooks =

American baseball player

- Outfielder
- Born: February 22, 1893; Galveston, Texas, U.S.
- Died: February 1, 1949 (aged 55); St. Louis, Missouri, U.S.
- Batted: Right Threw: Right

Negro league baseball debut
- 1919, for the St. Louis Giants

Last appearance
- 1926, for the Dayton Marcos
- Stats at Baseball Reference

Teams
- St. Louis Giants (1919–1921); St. Louis Stars (1922–1923); St. Louis Giants (1924); Dayton Marcos (1926)

Sidney William Brooks (February 22, 1893 – February 1, 1949) was an American Negro league baseball outfielder between 1919 and 1926.

A native of Galveston, Texas, Brooks made his Negro leagues debut in 1919 with the St. Louis Giants. He played five seasons for the Giants, later known as the Stars. Brooks finished his career in 1926 with the Dayton Marcos. He died in St. Louis, Missouri in 1949 at age 55.
