= Dogfights (TV series) =

American TV series

- A CGI P-40 Tomahawk from Dogfights
- Created by: Cynthia Harrison; Jason McKinley; Brooks Wachtel
- Starring: Pilots involved
- Narrated by: Phil Crowley
- Country of origin: United States
- Original language: English
- No. of seasons: 2
- No. of episodes: 29+1 Pilot Episode

Production
- Executive producers: Robert Kirk; Rob Lihani
- Producers: Abe Scheuermann; David Connelly
- Running time: about 45 minutes

Original release
- Network: History Channel
- Release: November 3, 2006 – May 10, 2008

Dogfights is an American military aviation themed television series depicting historical re-enactments of air-to-air combat that took place in World War I, World War II, the Korean War, and the Vietnam War, as well as smaller conflicts such as the Gulf War and the Six-Day War. The program consists of former fighter pilots sharing their stories of actual dogfights in which they took part, combined with computer-generated imagery (CGI) to give the viewer a better perspective of what it is like to engage in aerial combat.

== Historical documentary format ==
The show has simulated not only air combat, but also surface sea combat, as in the case of Taffy 3's stand against the Japanese Center Force, and the Royal Navy's pursuit and destruction of the German battleship Bismarck, which included the Bismarck being hit by torpedo bombers. These episodes have been cited as a source for several English Wikipedia articles, such as the Battle of Leyte Gulf. Simulated models include views from the cockpit, pilots visible through canopies, and battle damage. Orders of battle, comparisons of aircraft, and dissections of particular maneuvers are also presented. Jet and prop powered aircraft and ships from various eras from the First World War to the late 20th century are featured. The series often presents interviews of pilots and experts, so far mostly Americans or their allies such as a survivor of HMS Hood (as was a German survivor of Bismarck), though the first episode of the second season showed interviews with Japanese and German pilots.

== Creation of the series ==
The series was created after the airing of a one-time special called Dogfights: The Greatest Air Battles in September 2005. That program's combination of realistic-looking CGI dogfights, interviews, period documentary footage, and voice-over narration proved so successful, that the History Channel requested the production of an entire TV series, which became Dogfights. The original special continues to air occasionally and has been recently updated to reflect the current series logo.

== Overview ==
"Now, you're in the cockpit... Experience the battle. Dissect the tactics. Re-live the dogfights."

— Opening narration by Phil Crowley.

In each episode, true historical dogfights of a certain battle or war are played out. Pilots from the actual fights are brought in to re-tell their accounts of the battles. Along with the battle, there are occasional scenes that describe the pilot's living conditions or events that have happened outside the battle. Each battle is told by the pilot and a special narrator. CGI effects are used, providing a realistic simulation. The show also describes the aircraft, showing diagrams on screen and taking some time to describe the advantages and disadvantages of each plane. It also describes and illustrates the air maneuvers and tactics used by the pilots. Usually, the battles are told by pilots of the winning side of each war or battle. Occasionally, there are other variants brought into a battle besides the planes. For example, a pilot may recount their experience destroying ship fleets, bombing enemy air fields, or dealing with Anti Aircraft fire from the ground, but the process is interrupted by enemy planes. After each battle, the show usually features a short biography about the pilots and the conflicts they were involved in, and then the credits roll.

== Episode list ==
=== Pilot episode ===
No.	Title	Original airdate
Pilot episode	"The Greatest Air Battles"	09/16/05
US Army Air Service SPAD S.XIII piloted by Eddie Rickenbacker vs. Luftstreitkräfte Fokker D.VIIs and LVG C.VIs on September 25, 1918; US Army Air Force P-51 Mustang piloted by Bud Anderson vs. Luftwaffe Messerschmitt Bf 109s on May 27, 1944; US Air Force F-86 Sabre piloted by Frederick "Boots" Blesse vs. North Korean MiG-15s on October 2, 1952; US Navy F-4 Phantom II piloted by Duke Cunningham; and Willy "Irish" Driscoll vs. North Vietnamese MiG-17s (piloted by the elusive Colonel Toon) and MiG-21s on May 10, 1972.

=== Season one ===
No.	Title	Original airdate
01	"MiG Alley"	11/03/06
US Air Force aces Robbie Risner and Ralph Parr fly the F-86 Sabre vs. the MiG-15 in the Korean War.
02	"Air Ambush"	11/10/06
US Army Air Force Flying ace Robin Olds pilots the P-38 Lightning vs. the Luftwaffe Messerschmitt Bf 109 in 1944. Also, Air Force F-4 Phantoms trick MiG-21s into a dogfight by disguising themselves as F-105 Thunderchiefs, natural prey of the North Vietnamese MiG-21s, in Operation Bolo on January 2, 1967.
03	"Flying Tigers"	11/17/06
Flying Tigers squadron; Leading Tiger aces Tex Hill and John R. Alison's P-40 Tomahawk vs. the Imperial Japanese Army Air Service's Ki-27 Nate, Ki-21 Sallys and Ki-43 Oscar.
04	"Guadalcanal"	11/24/06
Guadalcanal campaign aces; Captain John Lucian Smith and Medal of Honor recipients Jefferson J. DeBlanc and James E. Swett pilot the Grumman F4F Wildcat vs. the Mitsubishi Zeros, Mitsubishi F1M Petes, Aichi D3A Vals, and Nakajima Ki-43 Oscars.
05	"Hell Over Hanoi"	12/01/06
American pilots Fred Olmsted and Dan Cherry, and ace Steve Ritchie in USAF F-4 Phantoms fight North Vietnamese MiG-21s.
06	"The Zero Killer"	12/08/06
Robert Duncan, Hamilton McWhorter, and Alexander Vraciu fly the improved US Navy fighter Grumman F6F Hellcat in battles against Japanese Mitsubishi Zeroes and Nakajima A6M2-N Rufes.
07	"The Last Gunfighter"	12/15/06
US Navy pilots Paul Speer, Phil Wood, and Lieutenant Commander Richard Schaffert in the F-8 Crusader vs. North Vietnamese Air Force MiG-17s and MiG-21s.
08	"Death of the Japanese Navy"	12/29/06
The Leyte Gulf attack on Taffy 3, and the counterattack of destroyers, destroyer escorts, and escort carriers - namely the USS Johnston and USS Samuel B. Roberts - against an armored main battle force predominantly consisting of heavy cruisers and fast battleships in the Battle off Samar on October 25, 1944. Despite lacking suitable armament except for torpedoes, destroyers with carrier air support inflicted enough damage and confusion to send the Japanese force back without it accomplishing its primary goal. The episode also covers Operation Ten-Go, the last major Japanese naval operation in the Pacific campaign of World War II, and the sinking of the Japanese battleship Yamato on April 7, 1945.
09	"Hunt for the Bismarck"	01/05/07
HMS Hood is sunk and HMS Prince of Wales damaged on May 24, 1941, in the Battle of Denmark Strait by the German battleship Bismarck and the German heavy cruiser Prinz Eugen. A hunt begins for the damaged German battleship by Force H, led by Admiral John Tovey. Swordfish biplanes from the carrier HMS Ark Royal of the British Fleet Air Arm attack the Bismarck, and the battleships HMS King George V, HMS Rodney, cruisers HMS Norfolk, HMS Dorsetshire and HMS Sheffield send it to the sea floor on May 27.
10	" Long Odds"	01/12/07
This episode showcases survival stories of bomber pilots battling fighter aircraft. US Navy pilot Stanley 'Swede' Vejtasa in a SBD Dauntless vs. the A6M Zero in the Battle of the Coral Sea; the US Army Air Force B-17 Flying Fortress 'Old 666' piloted by Jay Zeamer vs. A6M Zeroes & a Ki-46 "Dinah"; and Leo K. Thorsness in an F-105 Thunderchief vs. the North Vietnamese Air Force MiG-17 in the Vietnam War.
11	"Dogfights of the Middle East"	01/19/07
Israeli Air Force Mirage III vs. the Egyptian Air Force MiG-17 & MiG-19 during the Six-Day War; defection of Munir Redfa with an Iraqi Air Force MiG-21 in 1966; and Israeli Air Force F-15 Eagle vs. Syrian Air Force MiG-21 over Lebanon in 1979.

=== Season two ===
No.	Title	Original airdate
01	"Kamikaze"	07/13/07
Towards the end of World War II, Japan sent volunteer pilots on suicide attacks against American naval targets. Kamikaze attacks covered include those against the escort carrier USS St. Lo on October 25, 1944 done by Yukio Seki, and the destroyer USS Laffey on April 16, 1945, off Okinawa. Also discussed is the use of Japanese Ohka rocket planes on the USS Mannert L. Abele and USS Stanly.
02	"Luftwaffe's Deadliest Mission"	07/13/07
On April 7, 1945, pilots of the Sonderkommando Elbe ram their stripped-down Bf 109s into incoming American B-24 Liberator and B-17 Flying Fortress bombers while facing down deadly P-51 Mustang escort fighters. Note: This episode was first released as "Kamikaze Part II", and is sometimes combined with the previous one and shown as a single, two-hour episode also called "Kamikaze".
03	"Jet vs. Jet"	07/20/07
In the skies over North Korea, F-86 Sabres battle MiG-15s. American pilots such as James Jabara, Ralph "Hoot" Gibson, and Ralph Parr are in pursuit of a previously unknown achievement — the title of jet ace.
04	"Thunderbolt"	07/27/07
The rugged P-47 Thunderbolt, or "Jug" as it was known, was the largest single-seat fighter plane of World War II. The episode portrays aerial battles fought by Robert S. Johnson, George Sutcliffe, and Ken Dalhberg against Focke-Wulf Fw 190s and Messerschmitt Bf 109s.
05	"Gun Kills of Vietnam"	08/3/07
The era of missiles had arrived, and electronic warfare was coming of age. But when technology failed, pilots were forced to fight the old-fashioned way — with Guns. Clinton Johnson and Charles Hartman down a MiG-17 with propeller-driven A-1 Skyraiders armed with 20-mm cannons in June 1965; Robert Titus and Milan Zimer's F-4 Phantom shoots it out with a 20-mm gun pod against MiG-21s in May 1967; Darrell Simmonds and George McKinney's Phantom fights MiG-17s in November 1967.
06	"Desert Aces"	08/10/07
Pilots of the Israeli Air Force. The episode covers combat missions flown by Ran Ronen and by "ace of aces" Giora Epstein. Ronen used the French-built Mirage III to engage British-built Jordanian Air Force Hawker Hunters in 1966. Epstein flew a Mirage V against Egyptian Sukhoi Su-7s in the Six-Day War, and piloted a Nesher against MiG-21s in the Yom Kippur War.
07	"The First Dogfighters"	08/23/07
Dogfighting was invented by the fighter pilots of World War I. Ernst Udet's Albatros D.III vs. Georges Guynemer's SPAD VII in June 1917; Werner Voss, flying a Fokker triplane, battles six S.E.5a pilots, including leading aces James McCudden, Arthur Rhys Davids, and Richard Maybery on September 24, 1917; and Arthur Raymond Brooks and his SPAD XIII dogfights with eight Fokker D.VIIs in 1918.
08	"No Room for Error"	08/30/07
Low-altitude dogfights are portrayed. Art Fiedler and his P-51 Mustang go against Focke-Wulf Fw 190s and Messerschmitt Bf 109s in World War II; James H. Kasler and his F-86 Sabre go against MiG-15s in the Korean War; and Robin Olds and Steve Croker in their F-4 Phantom II fight against MiG-17s in the Vietnam War.
09	"Night Fighters"	09/21/07
The history of dogfighting in darkness is covered. Radar-equipped F6F Hellcats shoot down A6M2-N "Rufe"s over Chichi Jima, and P-61 Black Widows score kills against Messerschmitt Me 410's over Germany in World War II. The F3D Skyknight downs a faster MiG-15 in the Korean War. USAF F-15 Eagles and F-117 Nighthawks oppose MiG-29s in Operation Allied Force.
10	"The Bloodiest Day"	12/03/07
May 10, 1972, was the bloodiest day of air combat during the Vietnam War. American F-4 Phantoms, A-6 Intruders, and A-7 Corsairs fought against North Vietnamese MiG-21s, MiG-19s, and MiG-17s. The episode includes battles fought by Bob Lodge and Roger Locher and by Steve Ritchie and Charles B. DeBellevue.
11	"P-51 Mustang"	12/04/07
In the European and Pacific theaters of World War II, the P-51 Mustang became one of the conflict's most successful and recognizable aircraft. The episode portrays aerial battles fought by Donald S. Bryan, Robert Scamara, and Richard Candelaria against German and Japanese aircraft, including the Messerschmitt Bf 109, Kawanishi N1K "Georges", Nakajima Ki-84 "Franks", Mitsubishi A6M Zero, and Messerschmitt Me 262 Schwalbe.
12	"Dogfights of Desert Storm"	12/05/07
An EF-111 Raven is attacked by an Iraqi Mirage F-1 jet on the first night of Operation Desert Storm and American fighter pilots pit F-15 Eagles against Iraqi MiG-25s, MiG-23s and advanced MiG-29s during the day. American aviators James Denton, Brent Brandon, Larry Pitts, Cesar Rodriguez, Craig Underhill, and Tony "Kimo" Schiavi are interviewed.
13	"The Tuskegee Airmen "	12/06/07
The Tuskegee Airmen were African-American pilots of the 332d Fighter Group, the first all-black fighter squadron in the US Armed Forces. They distinguished themselves as one of the most successful fighter groups of World War II, despite the bigotry and prejudice they faced from their own countrymen. Piloting P-51 Mustangs, they flew many missions protecting American bombers from the Luftwaffe's Bf 109, Fw 190, and Me 262 fighters. The episode includes interviews with pilots Lee Archer, Roscoe Brown, and Charles McGee.
14	"MiG Killers of Midway"	12/07/07
Recalling Vietnam War battles involving F-4 Phantoms from the USS Midway against North Vietnamese MiG-17s. This episode portrays dogfights fought by J.C. Smith, Henry "Bart" Bartholomay, Pat Arwood, Mike "Taco" Bell, Ronald "Mugs" McKeown, and John C. "Jack" Ensch. Midway pilots scored the first and last MiG kills over Vietnam.
15	"Supersonic"	02/29/08
Often in a dogfight, the faster plane is at an advantage. The episode includes aerial combat by James F. "Lou" Luma and his de Havilland Mosquito against multiple Luftwaffe aircraft and Jerry O'Keefe becoming an ace in a day in his F4U Corsair against kamikaze Aichi D3A Vals off Okinawa in World War II; Bruce Hinton scoring the first F-86 Sabre kill against a MiG-15 in the Korean War; and Phil Handley scoring the only recorded supersonic gun kill in history in his F-4 Phantom against MiG-19s in the Vietnam War.
16	"Death of the Luftwaffe"	03/7/08
The Luftwaffe's last great offensive, called Operation Bodenplatte, occurred on January 1, 1945. Bob Brulle, Sanford K. Moats, Alden Rigby, and Robert Creamer were American P-51 and P-47 pilots of the 352nd Fighter Group whose airbase, known as Y-29, was attacked by Fw 190 and Bf 109 fighters. After this day, the Luftwaffe was shattered as an effective fighting force.
17	"Secret Weapons"	03/14/08
Secret weapons of World War II, including German Messerschmitt Me 163 Komet rocket-powered interceptors, Japanese kaiten suicide submarines, and the American remote controlled airplanes of Operation Aphrodite and the death of Joseph P. Kennedy, Jr.
18	"Dogfights of the Future"	05/10/08
Experience five future combat scenarios featuring modern 4.5 and 5th generation designs. First 4 F-22 Raptors engage Mikoyan MiG-29s, Sukhoi Su-30s and Dassault Rafales with the B-1R missile truck. The next scenario involves a group of F-35 Lightning IIs led by Raptors facing SA-23 surface to air missiles and MiG-35s. Next, Dassault Rafales and F-22s engage Su-30s with a Boeing 767 modified to carry a laser. Then the F-22 fights with the Russian fifth generation Su-47 Berkut and advanced SAMs. The show ends with a "dogfight" in low Earth orbit between two scramjets.

== DVDs ==
From 2007 to 2009, The History Channel Home Entertainment released the series on Region 1 DVD.

Dogfights - The Complete Season One DVD set was released on April 24, 2007. Featuring all eleven episodes, it also includes the original pilot episode and a behind-the-scenes featurette called "Dogfights: The Planes." The picture format is 4:3 (1.33:1) even though the series was produced in anamorphic 16:9 widescreen.

Dogfights - The Complete Season Two 5 DVD set was released on June 24, 2008.

Dogfights - The Complete Series All the episodes including Dogfights of the Future are included in a 10 DVD set, which was released on October 27, 2009.

== Video game ==
Starting with season 2, the History Channel produced, in conjunction with Kuma Reality Games, a free episodic PC video game based on the Dogfights series. Dogfights: The Game puts players in interactive recreations of actual episodes from the TV show. The game primarily concentrates on the World War II episodes of the series, recreating battles from episodes such as "Thunderbolt" and "Japanese Kamikaze".

'Dogfights: The Game' utilizes Valve's Source Engine, similar to Kuma Games' other game produced for the History Channel: ShootOut! The Game and their own property Kuma\War.

== See also ==
- The History Channel
- Greatest Tank Battles
- Shootout!
- The Lost Evidence
- Dogfight
- Flying ace
- Battle 360°
