= Esteban Hotesse =

Tuskegee Airman (1919–1945)

Esteban Hotesse (also known as Stephen Hotesse)
- Born: February 11, 1919; Moca, Dominican Republic
- Died: July 8, 1945 (aged 26); Jefferson Township, Switzerland County, Indiana
- Military career
- Allegiance: United States
- Branch: United States Army
- Service years: 1942-1945
- Rank: Second Lieutenant
- Units: 619th Bombardment Squadron; 477th Medium Bombardment Group

Esteban Hotesse (February 11, 1919 – July 8, 1945) (also known as "Stephen Hotesse") was a black Dominican American United States Army Air Force second lieutenant and member of the World War II combat fighter group, the Tuskegee Airmen. He was the only Dominican-born member of the Tuskegee Airmen. He died in a B-25 Mitchell crash in July 1945.

== Early life and family ==
Hotesse was born on February 11, 1919, in Moca, Espaillat, Dominican Republic. He was the son of Clara Pacheco, a Dominican woman. On November 1, 1923, Hotesse immigrated to the United States via the Port of New York at the age of four.

Hotesse was married to Mrs. Iristella {Lind} Hotesse, a Puerto Rican woman. He was the father of two daughters, Mary Lou Hotesse and Rosalie Hotesse. Hotesse and his family were living in Manhattan, New York. After serving as a U.S. Army officer, he and his family applied for U.S. citizenship in April 1943.

== Military career ==
Hotesse was admitted to the Tuskegee Flight School Program on February 21, 1942, through which he received his 2nd lieutenant commission and flight wings.

Hotesse did not see combat during World War II, remaining stateside his short three-year career. His only two assignments were the 477th Bombardment Group, Medium, Fort Knox, Kentucky to Freeman Field (1942-1943), and the 619th Bombardment Squadron (Medium), Godman Field (1943-1945)

=== Freeman Field Mutiny ===
On April 5, 1945, Hotesse was among several black officers within the 477th Bombardment Group arrested in the Freeman Field Mutiny.

Colonel Robert Selway, a white United States Army Air Forces officer and first commanding officer of the Tuskegee Airmen's 477th Medium Bombardment Group within the First Air Force, designated the Officer's Club for "supervisory and instructor personnel" and another more substandard facility for "trainees." Like his ranking officer, First Air Force commanding general, the state of Georgia's Major General Frank O'Driscoll Hunter, Colonel Selway was a racial segregationist. Intentionally, Selway classified all members of the all-black 447th Bombardment Group as trainees, effectively segregating the officer clubs by race. His illegal, racially discriminatory maneuver violated U.S. Army Regulation 210-10, Paragraph 19, which prohibited any public building on a military installation from being used "for the accommodation of any self-constituted special or exclusive group," thereby requiring officers' clubs be open to all officers regardless of race. For the next two days, black officers in groups ranging from twelve to twenty entered the whites-only club peacefully. 36 black officers entered the Officer's Club the first day and were arrested when they refused to leave, while 35 officers were arrested the following night.

Shortly after, Colonel Selway implemented Base Regulation 85-2, assigning specific housing, mess, and recreational facilities to officers. Selway proceeded to order each officer to sign a form confirming that they had read and understood the regulation. 101 of the 422 officers refused to sign, and were arrested for insubordination.

On April 23, General George Marshall ordered the 101 released, including Hotesse, while General Henry H. Arnold transferred command of the 477th Bombardment Group to Colonel Benjamin O. Davis Jr.

Civil Rights historians regard the Freeman Field Mutiny as a seminal event towards Truman's eventual full integration of the U.S. armed forces.

== Death ==
Hotesse was serving as a Pilot with the 619th Squadron, 447th Bombardment Group. On July 8, 1945, Hotesse died in a B-25J Mitchell (#44-30746) crash at the Ohio River between Indiana and Kentucky, 3 miles (4.8 km) northeast of Vevay, Indiana. The Pilot 1st Lieutenant Samuel A Black, Jr, Pilot Flight Officer Glenn W Pulliam, and Co-pilot Glenn Fullian were also killed. Engineer Isiah Grice suffered no injuries. Gunner Napoleon G suffered major injuries. The U.S. War Department ascribed the accident in the following accident report:

On July 8, 1945, the twin-engine B-25 (B= bomber) aircraft departed Godman Field, Kentucky for a military exercise over Hayes Bombing Range and then a training flight. The aircraft was to drop its bombs and then continue on a low altitude cross country where the co-pilot would take the controls. At Madison, Indiana the copilot began his descent from 1,000 feet to his assigned altitude of 100 feet above terrain. The copilot dropped below his assigned altitude, with water splashing onto the aircraft, both pilots attempted to pull on the yoke to gain altitude, with no success. The aircraft crashed into the Ohio River in Indiana killing the pilot, copilot, and Hotesse. It was reported the upon impact the cockpit and tail broke away from the aircraft.

== Legacy ==
On August 23, 2018, the CUNY Dominican Studies Institute and U.S. Rep. Adriano Espaillat (NY-13) hosted a ceremony to honor Esteban Hotesse and presented his family with a replica of the Congressional Gold Medal awarded to the Tuskegee Airmen on March 29, 2007.

== See also ==
- List of Tuskegee Airmen Cadet Pilot Graduation Classes
- List of Tuskegee Airmen
- Military history of African Americans
- Dogfights (TV series)
- Executive Order 9981
- The Tuskegee Airmen (movie)
