= Freeman Army Airfield Museum =

- Location within Indiana
- Established: 1996
- Location: Seymour, Indiana
- Coordinates: 38.9255°N 85.9074°W
- Type: Aviation museum
- Founders: Jack Hildreth; Ted Jordan; Harry Knight; Lou Osterman; Lou Thole; Al Seibert
- Curator: Larry Bothe
- Website: www.freemanarmyairfieldmuseum.org

The Freeman Army Airfield Museum is an aviation museum located at Freeman Municipal Airport in Seymour, Indiana focused on the history of Freeman Army Airfield and captured Axis aircraft.

== History ==
=== Background ===
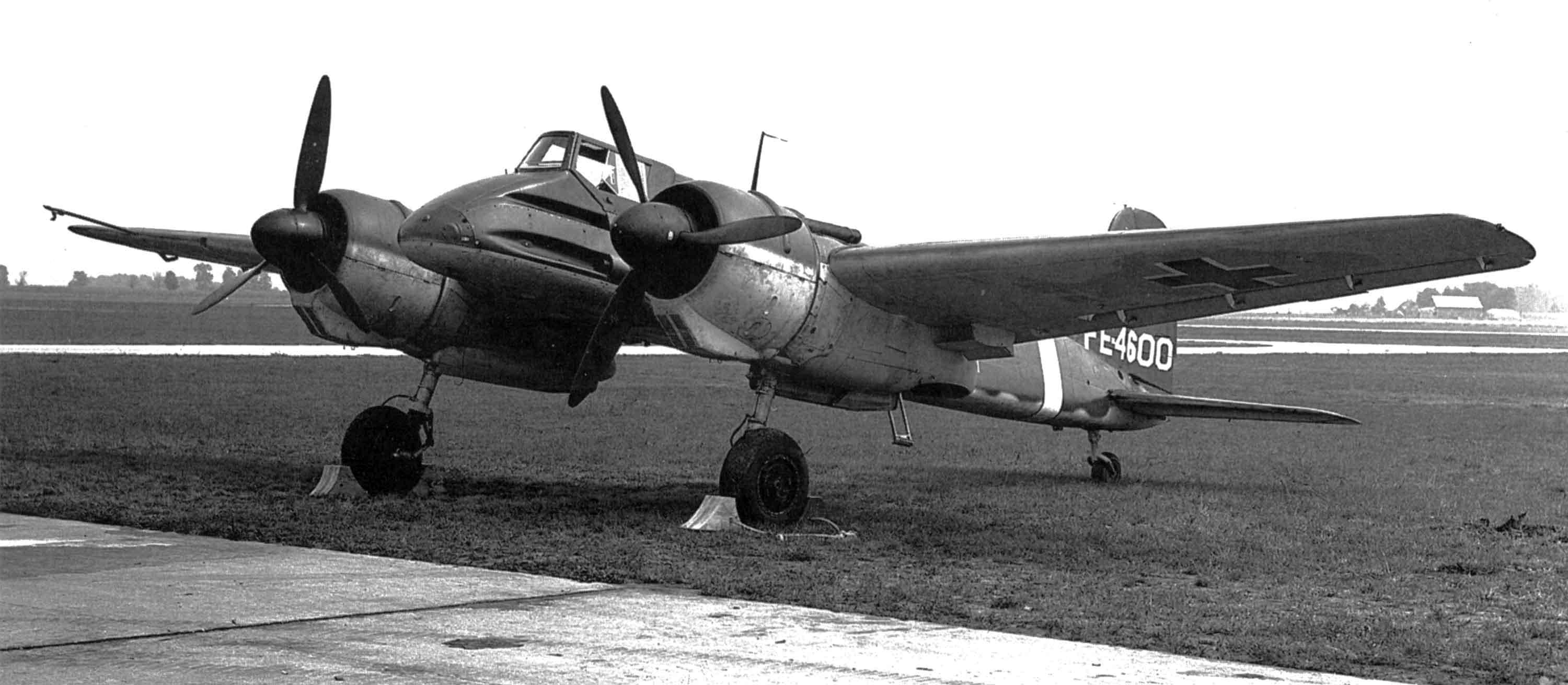
A captured Henschel Hs 129 B on display at Freeman Army Airfield

Following the end of World War II, captured Axis aircraft were shipped to Freeman Army Airfield where they were tested to gather intelligence and experience. A number of the aircraft were either lost during testing or scrapped on location and the remains were buried after the program ended in December 1946.

Starting in the early 1990s, a succession of groups began searching for these aircraft.

=== Establishment ===
The museum was founded in 1996 by a group of individuals that included Jack Hildreth, Ted Jordan, Harry Knight, Lou Osterman, Lou Thole and Al Seibert. It was dedicated in a 3,000 sq ft (280 m^{2}) former Link Trainer building on 16 August 1977 and only one week later a collection of aircraft parts was dug up by a team at the airport. These artifacts went on display in 1999.

The museum acquired a second Link trainer building in 2002, which was opened as the Museum Annex in 2009. In the meantime, the museum acquired one of the two original base fire trucks.

The museum held a rededication in April 2015 following a refreshing of displays, the addition of restrooms and improved handicap accessibility. A few months later, a memorial plaza to the Tuskegee Airmen honoring the Freeman Field mutiny was dedicated. (Note: Two statues were added to the plaza in 2022.) New signs for the museum were unveiled in June 2016.

The museum began working on renovating the (museum annex) building in 2018 in anticipation of receiving a Jumo 004 and a radial engine from the National Air and Space Museum. In December, opened a flight simulator built as part of an Eagle Scout project.

In 2022, the Community Foundation of Jackson County established an endowment to support the museum.

== Exhibits ==
The museum displays aircraft parts and other artifacts recovered from archaeological digs at the airport. Other exhibits include the Beechcraft AT-10 Wichita, women in World War II and two flight simulators.

== Events ==
The museum holds an annual Airplane Ride Day. It also previously held a reunion of former pilots at the airport.

== Programs ==
Although not strictly associated with the museum, several groups have conducted digs at the airfield in an attempt to find aircraft remains. The first was a group called Blue Sky in the early 1990s led by Charlie Osborn, which was unsuccessful. The second, Salvage One, created by Lex Cralley managed to find some artifacts in 1997, but disbanded after not discovering any complete aircraft. The third, Freeman Field Recovery Team was organized in 2009 by David Gray. The latter was the subject of an episode of the television show Diggers in 2014.

== See also ==
- List of aviation museums
