= 616th Bombardment Squadron =

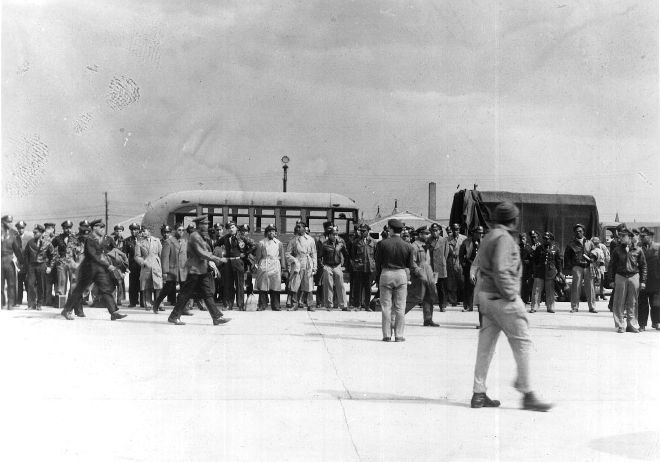
- Officers of the 477th Bombardment Group at Freeman Field, about to board air transports to take them to Godman Field (Note: The officers were under arrest for refusing to sign a document acknowledging that they had read a regulation denying them access to an all-white officers' club.)
- Active: 1943; 1944–1945
- Country: United States
- Branch: United States Air Force
- Role: Medium bomber

Insignia
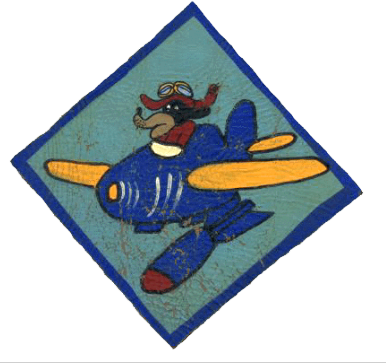
- 616th Bombardment Squadron emblem (Note: Approved 14 August 1944. Description: On a light turquoise blue diamond bordered dark blue, a caricatured wolf in red flight suit and helmet, seated in cockpit of dark blue caricatured aircraft, with wings, tail fin and propeller hub yellow orange, dropping a large dark blue aerial bomb, with red nose and tail fin, from open bomb bay doors, all emitting white speed lines to rear.)

The 616th Bombardment Squadron was activated in 1943 as one of the four squadrons of the 477th Bombardment Group, the first (and only) bombardment group in the United States Army Air Forces to include black pilots. Members of the squadron participated in the Freeman Field Mutiny, protesting racial segregation in the military. The squadron was inactivated in 1945 when the 477th became a composite group that included bombardment and fighter squadrons.

== History ==
The 616th Bombardment Squadron was activated in June 1943 at MacDill Field, Florida, as one of the four original squadrons of the 477th Bombardment Group, but was inactivated in August.

The 477th group was reactivated in January 1944 at Selfridge Field, Michigan as the "first colored bombardment group in the Army Air Forces" with personnel drawn from Selfridge and from Tuskegee Army Air Field, Alabama. It was the second combat group to be activated with African American personnel and would be the only African-American bombardment group. The group moved to Godman Field, Kentucky in May. The unit encountered problems attributed to the lack of experienced personnel, which required even basic training in military occupational specialties to be conducted within the unit, rather than at technical training schools.

The initial commander of the 477th group enforced the then-standard practice of racial segregation on the posts where the squadron was stationed. The squadron's members were involved in the civil rights action referred to as the Freeman Field Mutiny; the "mutiny" came about when African-American aviators became outraged enough by racial segregation in the military that they resorted to mass insistence that military regulations prohibiting discrimination be enforced. The Freeman Field Mutiny was a crucial event in the African-American struggle for equal civil rights.

The 616th was inactivated in June 1945 as the 477th became a composite group formed of the 99th Fighter Squadron, 617th Bombardment Squadron and 618th Bombardment Squadron. At this time, Colonel Benjamin O. Davis, Jr., a black officer, assumed command of the group.

== Lineage ==
- Constituted as the 616th Bombardment Squadron (Medium) on 13 May 1943

Activated on 1 June 1943
Inactivated on 25 August 1943
Activated on 15 January 1944
Inactivated on 22 June 1945

== Assignments ==
- 477th Bombardment Group: 1 June 1943 – 25 August 1943
- 477th Bombardment Group (later 477th Composite Group): 15 May 1944 – 22 June 1945

== Stations ==
- MacDill Field, Florida: 1 June 1943 – 25 August 1943
- Selfridge Field, Michigan: 15 January 1944
- Godman Field, Kentucky: 6 May 1944
- Sturgis Army Air Field, Kentucky: 19 June 1944
- Godman Field, Kentucky: 20 July 1944
- Freeman Field, Indiana: 5 March 1945
- Godman Field, Kentucky: 27 April 1945 – 22 June 1945

== Aircraft ==
- Martin B-26 Marauder, 1943
- North American B-25 Mitchell, 1944–1945

== See also ==
- Tuskegee Airmen
- B-25 Mitchell units of the United States Army Air Forces
- List of Martin B-26 Marauder operators
