= Indiana World War II Army Airfields =

United States World War II army airfields

Indiana World War II Army Airfields
- Part of World War II

Site information
- Type: Army Airfields

Site history
- Built: 1940-1944
- In use: 1940-present

During World War II, the United States Army Air Forces (USAAF) established numerous airfields in Indiana for training pilots and aircrews of USAAF fighters and bombers.

Most of these airfields were under the command of the First Air Force or the Army Air Forces Training Command (AAFTC), a predecessor of the current Air Education and Training Command of the United States Air Force. However the other USAAF support commands—Air Technical Service Command (ATSC); Air Transport Command (ATC) or Troop Carrier Command—also commanded a significant number of airfields in support roles.

It is still possible to find remnants of these wartime airfields. Many were converted into municipal airports, some were returned to agriculture, and several were retained as United States Air Force installations and were front-line bases during the Cold War. Hundreds of the temporary buildings that were used survive today and are being used for other purposes.

== Major airfields ==
=== Troop Carrier Command ===
- Baer Army Air Base, Fort Wayne

I Troop Carrier Group
45th Army Air Force Base Unit
Now: Fort Wayne Air National Guard Station (IATA: FWA, ICAO: KFWA, FAA LID: FWA)

- Stout Army Air Field, Indianapolis

Headquarters, Troop Carrier Command, Glider Ferrying & Pickup facility
I Troop Carrier Group
362d Army Air Force Base Unit
Used by Indiana Air National Guard until 1961. Now closed and part of urbanized Indianapolis area

=== Air Transport Command ===
- Bendix Field AAF, South Bend

Now: South Bend International Airport (IATA: SBN, ICAO: KSBN, FAA LID: SBN)

=== Air Technical Service Command ===
- Evansville MAP, Evansville

Now: Evansville Regional Airport (IATA: EVV, ICAO: KEVV, FAA LID: EVV)

- Freeman Army Airfield, Seymour

Southeast Training Center
447th Army Air Force Base Unit
Now: Freeman Municipal Airport (IATA: SER, ICAO: KSER, FAA LID: ESER)

=== Army Air Force Training Command ===
- Atterbury Army Airfield, Columbus

Sub-base of George AAF, Illinois (now: Lawrenceville-Vincennes International Airport (IATA: LWV, ICAO: KLWV, FAA LID: LWV))
304th Army Air Force Base Unit
Now: Columbus Municipal Airport (IATA: CLU, ICAO: KBAK, FAA LID: BAK)

=== Other ===
- Note: Bunker Hill Air Force Base / later Grissom Air Force Base, now Grissom Air Reserve Base, was a United States Navy airfield known as Naval Air Station Bunker Hill during World War II.
