= 919th Air Refueling Squadron =

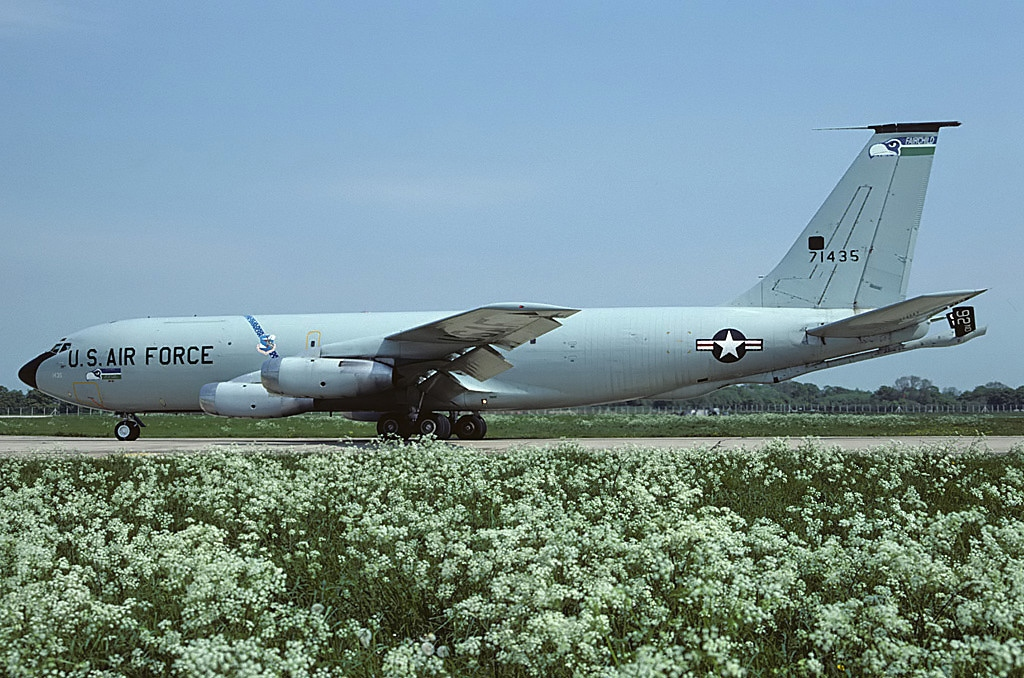
- Boeing KC-135A Stratotanker in Strategic Air Command markings
- Active: 1943; 1944–1945; 1960–1971
- Country: United States
- Branch: United States Air Force
- Role: Air refueling
- Motto: Dependable
- Decorations: Air Force Outstanding Unit Award

Insignia
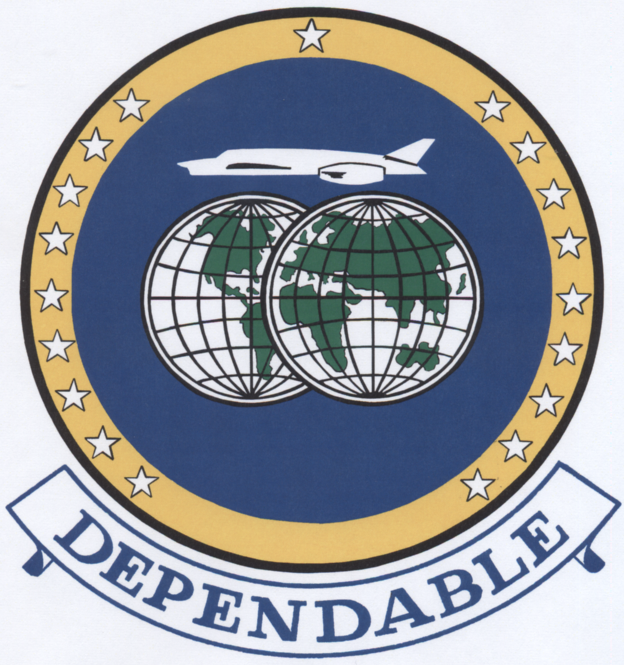
- 919th Air Refueling Squadron emblem

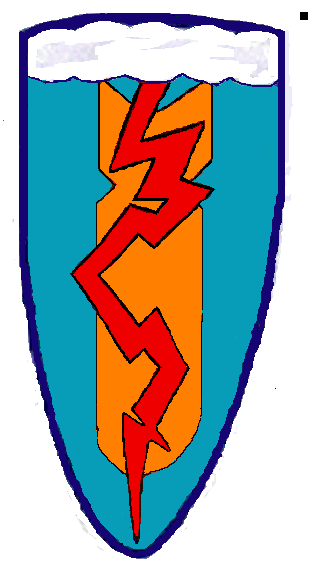
- 619th Bombardment Squadron emblem (Note: Approved 18 August 1944. Description: On a light turquoise figure in the shape of an aircraft cannon shell, bordered dark blue, a large yellow orange aerial bomb palewise surmounted by a jagged red lightning bolt striking from a white cloud formation, edged black, in chief.)

The 919th Air Refueling Squadron is an inactive United States Air Force unit. It was last assigned to the 306th Bombardment Wing, stationed at McCoy Air Force Base, Florida. It was inactivated on 30 June 1971.

The squadron was first activated as the 619th Bombardment Squadron in 1943. It was one of the four squadrons of the 477th Bombardment Group, the first (and only) bombardment group in the United States Army Air Forces to include black pilots. Members of the squadron participated in the Freeman Field Mutiny, protesting racial segregation in the military. The squadron was inactivated in 1945 when the 477th became a composite group that included one bombardment and one fighter squadron.

The 919th Air Refueling Squadron was activated as a Strategic Air Command (SAC) tanker squadron in 1960 and moved to Turner Air Force Base, Georgia as part of SAC's program to disperse its Boeing B-52 Stratofortress as a defense against a first strike by the Soviet Union. The squadron served in this capacity for eleven years during which it deployed aircraft and aircrews to Southeast Asia during the Vietnam War.

The two squadrons were consolidated into a single unit in 1985, but the consolidated squadron has never been active.

== History ==
=== World War II ===
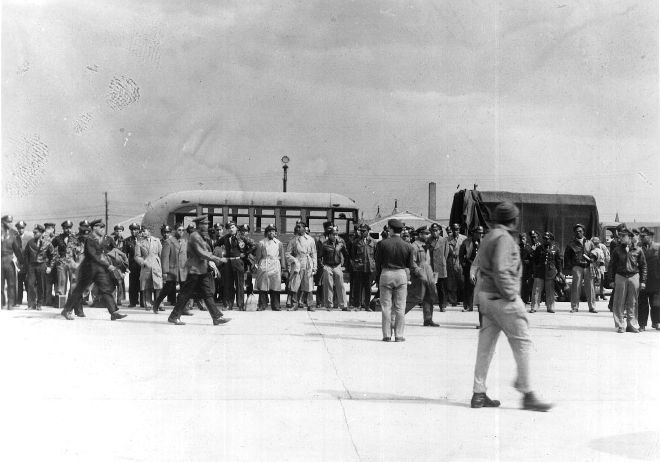
Officers of the 477th Bombardment Group at Freeman Field, Indiana, about to board air transports to take them to Godman Field, Kentucky. (Note: The officers were under arrest for refusing to sign a document acknowledging that they had read a regulation denying them access to an all-white officers' club.)

The 619th Bombardment Squadron was activated in June 1943 at MacDill Field, Florida. as one of the four original squadrons of the 477th Bombardment Group, but was inactivated in August.

The 477th group was reactivated in January 1944 at Selfridge Field, Michigan as the "first colored bombardment group in the Army Air Forces" with personnel drawn from Selfridge and from Tuskegee Army Air Field, Alabama. It was the second combat group to be activated with African American personnel and would be the only African-American bombardment group. The group moved to Godman Field, Kentucky, where the 619th was activated in May. The unit encountered problems attributed to the lack of experienced personnel, which required even basic training in military occupational specialties to be conducted within the unit, rather than at technical training schools.

Although designated a "colored" squadron, some officers, including the squadron leadership were white. The initial commander of the 477th Group enforced racial segregation on the posts where the squadron was stationed. The squadron's members were involved in the civil rights action referred to as the Freeman Field Mutiny; the "mutiny" came about when African-American aviators became outraged enough by racial segregation in the military that they resorted to mass insistence that military regulations prohibiting discrimination be enforced. The Freeman Field Mutiny was a crucial event in the African-American struggle for equal civil rights.

The 619th was inactivated in June 1945 when the 477th became a composite group formed of the 99th Fighter Squadron, 617th Bombardment Squadron and 618th Bombardment Squadron and Colonel Benjamin O. Davis, Jr., a black officer, assumed command of the group.

=== Cold War ===
The 919th Air Refueling Squadron was activated on 15 April 1960 by Strategic Air Command (SAC) at Carswell Air Force Base, Texas and assigned to the 7th Bombardment Wing as one of two tanker squadrons activated that day for assignment to dispersed Boeing B-52 Stratofortress wings. The squadron was equipped with Boeing KC-135 Stratotankers. The squadron moved to Turner Air Force Base, Georgia in June and was assigned to the 4138th Strategic Wing, where half of the squadrons's aircraft were maintained on fifteen-minute alert, fully fueled and ready for combat. The 919th maintained its alert commitment until it was inactivated, except for periods when the squadron was deployed.

The squadron deployed aircraft and aircrew to the Western Pacific, 1966–1967 to support SAC operations along with tactical aircraft flying combat missions over Indochina during the Vietnam War (Operation Young Tiger). During September 1966, the squadron was non-operational when all its crews and aircraft were deployed to support Operation Arc Light. When Turner AFB was transferred to the United States Navy in 1967 for re-designation as Naval Air Station Albany (Turner Field), the squadron moved to McCoy Air Force Base, Florida. In 1969 the squadron won the Saunders Trophy as the best air refueling squadron during SAC's annual Bombing and Navigation Competition. The following year the squadron converted from KC-135A aircraft to KC-135Qs. The squadron remained at McCoy until it was inactivated in 1971 and its equipment and personnel transferred to the 306th Air Refueling Squadron.

The 919th Air Refueling Squadron was consolidated with the 619th Bombardment Squadron in 1985 but the consolidated squadron has not been active.

== Lineage ==
619th Bombardment Squadron

- Constituted as the 619th Bombardment Squadron (Medium) on 13 May 1943

Activated on 1 June 1943
Inactivated on 25 August 1943
Activated on 27 May 1944
Inactivated on 22 June 1945

- Consolidated on 19 September 1985 with the 919th Air Refueling Squadron as the 919th Air Refueling Squadron

919th Air Refueling Squadron

- Constituted as the 919th Air Refueling Squadron, Heavy on 17 February 1960

Activated on 15 April 1960
Inactivated on 30 June 1971

- Consolidated on 19 September 1985 with the 619th Bombardment Squadron

=== Assignments ===
- 477th Bombardment Group: 1 June 1943 – 25 August 1943
- 477th Bombardment Group: 27 May 1944 – 22 June 1945
- 7th Bombardment Wing: 15 April 1960
- 4138th Strategic Wing: 15 June 1960
- 484th Bombardment Wing: 1 February 1963 (not operational 1 April – c. 29 September 1966)
- 306th Bombardment Wing: 25 March 1967 – 30 June 1971 (not operational after 15 June 1971)

=== Stations ===
- MacDill Field, Florida, 1 June 1943 – 25 August 1943
- Godman Field, Kentucky 27 May 1944
- Atterbury Army Air Field, 29 August 1944
- Godman Field, Kentucky, 3 January 1945
- Freeman Field, Indiana: 7 March 1945 – 22 June 1945
- Godman Field, Kentucky: 26 April 1945 – 22 June 1945
- Carswell Air Force Base, Texas, 15 April 1960
- Turner Air Force Base, Georgia, 15 June 1960
- McCoy Air Force Base, Florida, 25 March 1967 – 30 June 1971

=== Awards and campaigns ===
Award streamer	Award	Dates	Notes
	Air Force Outstanding Unit Award w/Combat "V" Device	1 September 1969 – 4 April 1970	919th Air Refueling Squadron
	Air Force Outstanding Unit Award	1 April 1966 – 30 September 1966	919th Air Refueling Squadron
	Air Force Outstanding Unit Award	1 October 1968 – 30 March 1969	919th Air Refueling Squadron
	Vietnamese Gallantry Cross with Palm	1 September 1969 – 4 April 1970	919th Air Refueling Squadron

- Saunders Trophy for best air refueling squadron in SAC 1969.

Service Streamer	Theater	Dates	Notes
	American Theater	1 June 1943 – 25 August 1943, 29 August 1944 – 22 June 1945	619th Bombardment Squadron

=== Aircraft ===
- Martin B-26 Marauder, 1943
- North American B-25 Mitchell, 1944–1945
- Boeing KC-135A Stratotanker, 1960–1970
- Boeing KC-135Q Stratotanker, 1970–1971

== See also ==
- Tuskegee Airmen
- List of United States Air Force air refueling squadrons
