= Bakalar Air Force Base =

Former US Air Force base near Columbus, Indiana

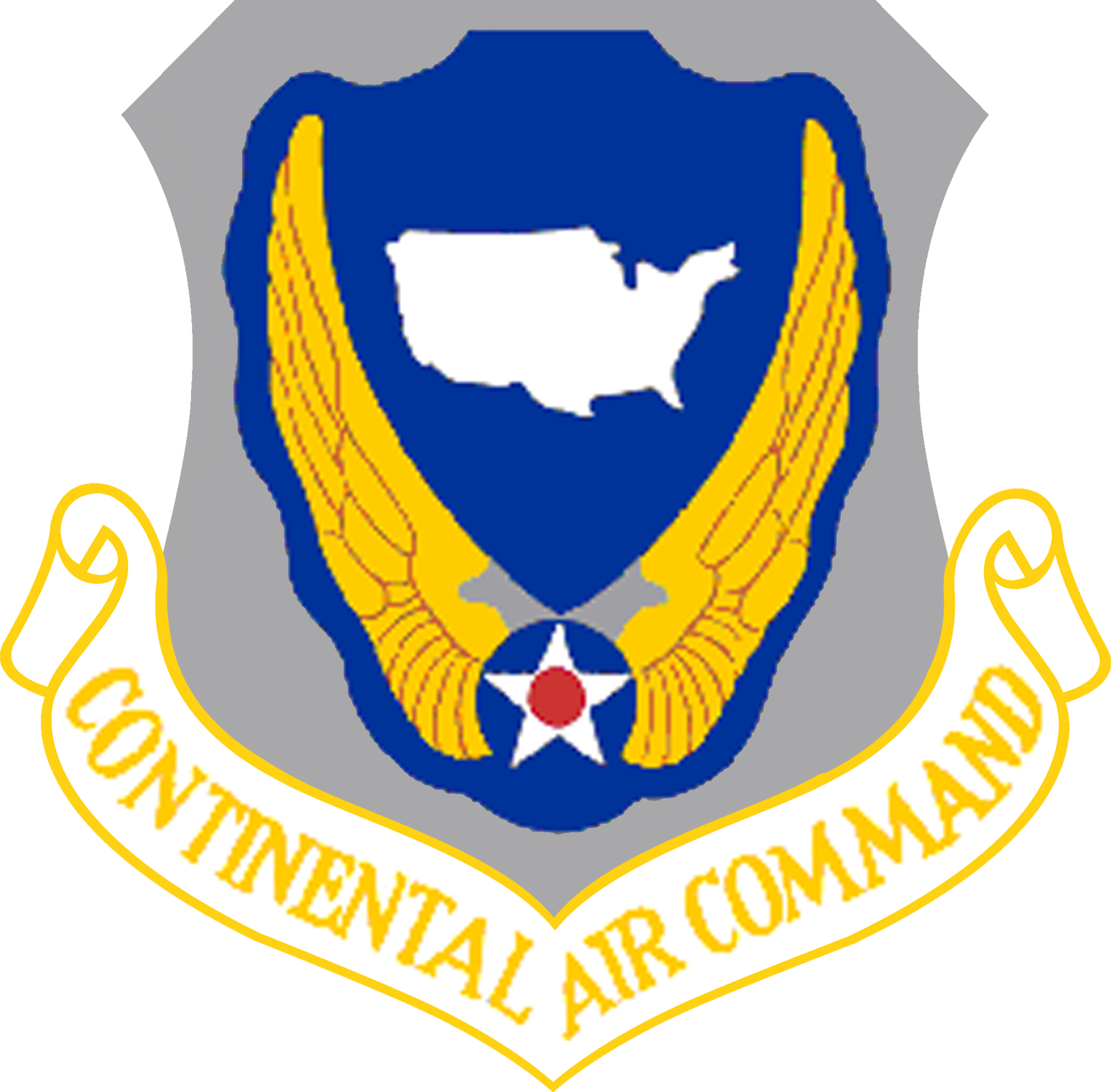
Bakalar Air Force Base
- Part of Continental Air Command (ConAc); Air Force Reserve (AFRES)
- Located near: Columbus, Indiana
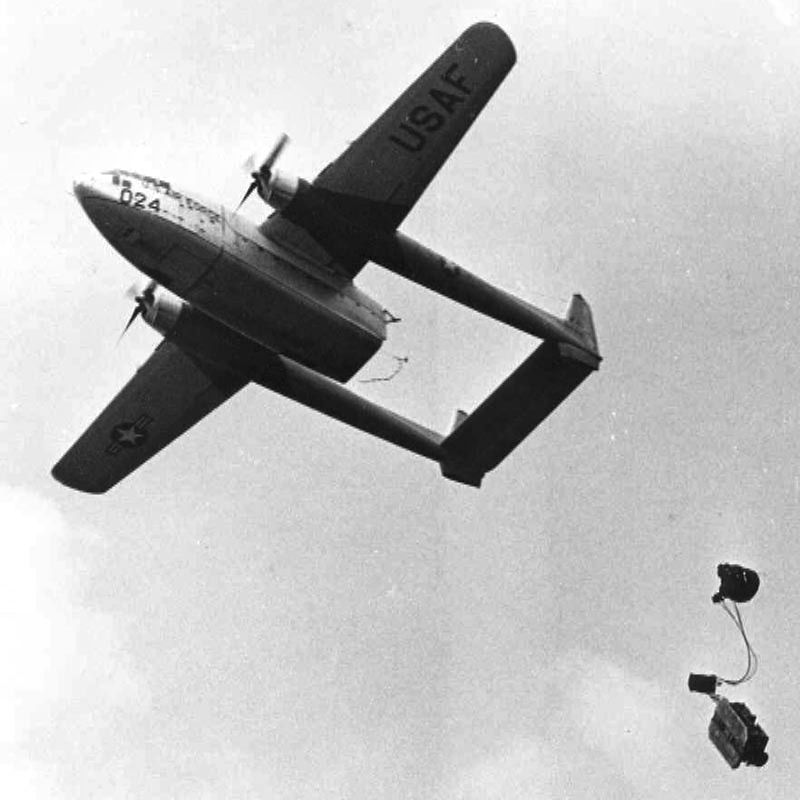
- Jeep being dropped by Fairchild C-119G Flying Boxcar, AF Ser. No. 52-6024 of the 434th Troop Carrier Wing, Bakalar AFB, Indiana, circa 1954 (note that the parachute has not yet opened).

Site information
- Type: Air Reserve Base
- Controlled by: United States Air Force

Location
- Location of Bakalar Air Force Base, Indiana
- Coordinates: 39°15′43″N 085°53′47″W

Site history
- Built: 1942
- In use: 1943–1970

Garrison information
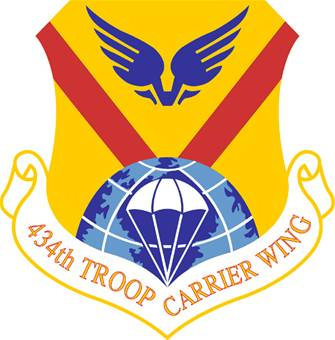
- Garrison: 434th Tactical Airlift Wing

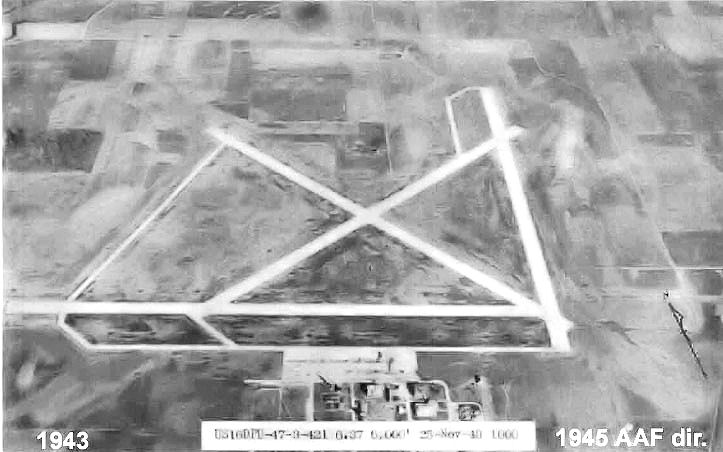
Atterbury Army Airfield, 25 November 1943

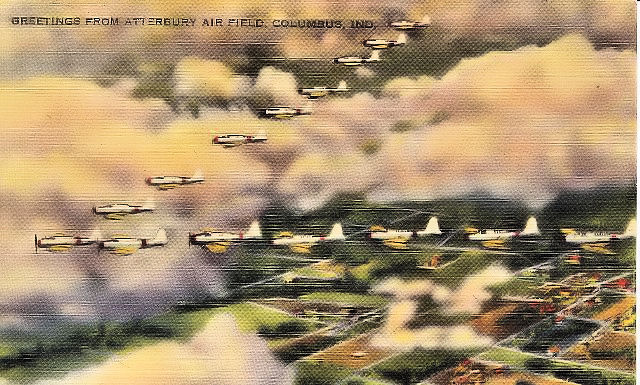
World War II Postcard

Bakalar Air Force Base is a former U.S. Air Force base located 4.4 miles (7.1 km) northeast of Columbus, Indiana. During World War II, the base was known as Atterbury Air Field and Atterbury Army Air Base (named in memory of Brigadier General William Wallace Atterbury), but it was renamed Bakalar Air Force Base in 1954 in honor of First Lieutenant John Edmond Bakalar, USAAF. Established in 1942, the airfield served as a training base for medium-range C-46 Commando and C-47 Skytrain troop carrier planes and glider pilots. It also was used for training North American B-25 Mitchell and Martin B-26 Marauder bomber crews. Reactivated during the Cold War, it was used as an Air Force Reserve training base for troop carrier, tactical airlift, and special operations flying units. The military base was closed in 1970. The present-day facility operates as the Columbus Municipal Airport.

== Initial construction ==
In June 1942 it was announced that a new airfield would be established near Camp Atterbury, a military training camp in south-central Indiana, approximately 12 miles (19 km) north of Columbus and 4 miles (6.4 km) west of Edinburgh. The 2,000-acre (8.1 km^{2}) airfield was initially called the Columbus Air Support Command base.

To make room for the new airbase, fourteen families were forced to sell their property to the U.S. government. Construction for the airfield began in August 1942. Pearson Construction Company of Benton Harbor, Michigan, was the contractor for the project. The airfield's initial construction cost was $4 million ($58,028,513) to $5 million ($72,535,642) in 2015 chained dollars. More than 1,000 workers employed during its construction. Captain Stratton Hammon, U.S. Army Corps of Engineers, supervised the construction, which began on 13 August 1942. Plans for the airbase included more than one hundred buildings, all of them were intended to be temporary.

Structures included barracks, mess halls, a post exchange (PX), recreation and administration buildings, airplane hangars, repair facilities, and warehouses. Most of the one-story, temporary buildings were constructed of fiberboard materials over a wooden frame, tarpaper, and non-masonry siding. The use of concrete and steel was limited because of the critical need elsewhere. Most buildings were hot and dusty in the summer and very cold in the winter. Streets as well as water, sewer and electrical services were also provided. The airbase initially included three concrete runways measuring 150 feet (46 m) wide by 1,500 feet (460 m) with connecting 80-foot (24 m) wide concrete taxiways. Later, the existing runways were extended to 5,000 feet (1,500 m) to accommodate larger planes and another runway and other facilities were added. The airfield's runways were oriented north–south, northeast–southwest, east–west, and northwest–southeast. A large parking ramp was also constructed on the south side of the runway complex with several large hangars. The location and further details of a small secondary airfield, called Bartholomew County Airfield, are not known.

In order to finish base on time, Captain Hammon needed a railroad spur to transport ten carloads of cement per day to the construction site. When the Pennsylvania Railroad refused to install the spur until other military obligations were met, Hammon ignored the military chain of command and appealed directly to the head of the War Production Board. Two days later the spur was under construction. In December 1942, the site was turned over to the Third Air Force.

== World War II-era use ==
Established as a United States Army Air Forces installation during World War II, the first large contingent of military personnel arrived at the new airfield in February 1943. The airfield was named Atterbury Army Airfield in April 1943 and renamed Atterbury Army Air Base in June 1943, in honor of Brigadier General William Wallace Atterbury, a New Albany, Indiana, native and Yale University graduate who received a Distinguished Service Medal for his contributions during World War I. Atterbury later became president of the Pennsylvania Railroad.

=== I Troop Carrier Command ===
In May 1944 jurisdiction of the new base was assigned to the I Troop Carrier Command. Atterbury's mission was to train and organize Douglas C-47 Skytrain and Douglas C-46 Commando transport aircrews. Many Waco CG-4 glider pilots also received training at Atterbury. On 5 May 1943, the 57th Station Complement Squadron was activated on the airfield to organize military personnel and command the station. Atterbury Army Air Field was a separate base from the U.S. Army's training facility at Camp Atterbury, which was finished in summer of 1942. The military camp was located a few miles north of where the air base would be laid out. As originally conceived, Atterbury Army Air Field was intended to allow ground troops (Camp Atterbury) and air troops (Atterbury Army Air Field) to learn to work together in combat.

By late summer 1943, most of I Troop Carrier command's transport and glider training was being phased down at Atterbury. In September, elements of the III Bomber Command 596th Bombardment Squadron, 397th Bombardment Group from MacDill Field, Florida, trained at the base. The unit flew Martin B-26 Marauders from Atterbury until early 1944, when it moved to Hunter Field, Georgia, prior to their overseas deployment and reassignment to the Ninth Air Force at RAF Gosfield (AAF-154), England.

=== First Air Force ===
In August 1944, Atterbury began what was considered a more controversial mission at the time. Throughout World War II, continued pressure from African-American civilian leaders led the U.S. Army to begin training blacks airmen as members of bomber crews, a step that opened many more skilled combat roles to them. In response to this pressure, jurisdiction of Atterbury AAF was transferred from I Troop Carrier Command to the First Air Force on 24 August 1944, and Atterbury's mission was changed to training black airmen for North American B-25 Mitchell medium bomber crews. Two squadrons, the 618th and 619th Bombardment Squadron, assigned to the 477th Composite Group at Godman Field, Kentucky, performed crew training at Atterbury between August 1944 and March 1945. The 118th Army Air Force Base Unit maintained administrative functions of the station. Atterbury was used for B-25 training because Godman Field was unsuitable for medium-sixed bombers.

In March 1945 the 477th reached its full combat strength and B-25 Mitchell training under the 477th CG was moved to Freeman Field, Indiana, where the group consolidated and was scheduled to go into combat on 1 July. Most personnel had been transferred to Freeman Field by April and Atterbury was placed in a standby-status under control of Godman Field, Illinois. After the departure of the 477th, most facilities at Atterbury were vacant; however it continued to operate as a communications site until December 1945, when it was closed and turned over to the War Assets Administration for disposal. After World War II, the base was used periodically for pilot training until it was reactivated during the Korean War.

== Cold War-era and Vietnam War use ==
From 1946 to 1949, the base remained on stand-by status. In May 1949 the U.S. Air Force announced its intention to reopen the World War II-era airfield. Initially, it served as a summer training headquarters for two-week active duty tours of 5,000 to 10,000 Air Force Reservists from thirteen north-central states, as well as a maintenance center. While the airbase was inactive, the Army Air Forces had been made a separate branch of the military and renamed the United States Air Force. The Atterbury airbase was placed under Continental Air Command, Tenth Air Force. The 2466th Air Force Reserve Combat Training Center reopened the installation when the center was moved from Evansville, Indiana. The bulk of the rehabilitation work on the base facilities was completed in June 1949.

The 434th Troop Carrier Wing, Medium, was established and activated on 1 July 1949 in the Air Force Reserve at the Atterbury Air Force Base. The Indianapolis-based 434th Troop Carrier Group, Medium, moved to Atterbury on 1 July 1949, and was assigned as the wing's operational component. The group had four Douglas C-47 Skytrain squadrons: the 71st, 72d, 73d and 74th Troop Carrier Squadrons.

The 434th Troop Carrier Wing served as a training organization at Atterbury for Air Force reservists, with most of the training was accomplished on weekends. The 434th Troop Carrier Group converted to C-46 Commandoes in August 1949. Training for the most part consisted of transition flying. The group also spent two weeks (8–22 July 1950) on active duty in a summer encampment. The 434th returned to its previous training role upon its return from the Korean War.

In a formal dedication ceremony held on 13 November 1954, the Atterbury base was renamed Bakalar Air Force Base in honor of First Lieutenant John Edmond Bakalar (1920–1944) of the 353d Fighter Squadron, 354th Fighter Group. Bakalar, a Hammond, Indiana, native was killed in action 1 September 1944, over France when his North American P-51D-5 Mustang (AAF Ser. No. 44-13895) crashed. His decorations and awards included the Distinguished Service Cross and the Purple Heart, both awarded posthumously, and the Air Medal with six Oak Leaf Clusters.

Throughout the 1950s, the 434th TCW performed routine reserve training at Bakalar. In 1957, the wing transitioned from C-46 Commandos to the Fairchild C-119 Flying Boxcar. (The 434th flew C-119's until the base was closed in 1970.) When the 434th Troop Carrier Group was inactivated on 14 April 1959, its squadrons were assigned directly to the 434th. The 2466th Air Force Reserve Combat Training Center was inactivated on 1 July 1959, due to budget reductions, and its mission was folded into the 434th's.

During the Cuban Missile Crisis in 1962, the 434th TCW was reactivated and brought under the operational control of Nineteenth Air Force, Tactical Air Command. The wing's C-119 squadrons began transporting supplies, equipment and U.S. Army personnel to Homestead Air Force Base, Florida. The 73d Troop Carrier Squadron was deployed to Scott Air Force Base, Illinois, from which it operated from during the crisis. In December 1962, the 434th was returned to control of the Fifth Air Force Reserve Region and resumed reserve training. In 1963, the 434th TCW was reorganized with the addition of three new reserve troop carrier groups being placed under its control. The 930th, 931st and 932d Troop Carrier Groups were activated and assigned on 11 February 1963. The wing's squadrons were divided among the three new groups: the 71st TCS was reassigned to the 930th TCG, the 72d to the 931st TGG, and the 73d to the 932d TCG. All were equipped with wing's former C-119 Boxcars.

On 1 October 1966, the 932d TCG was released from its assignment to the 434th TCW and reassigned to the 442d Military Airlift Wing at Richards-Gebaur AFB, Missouri, in preparation for heavy cargo operations. On 1 July 1967, the 434th was re-designated as the 434th Tactical Airlift Wing, with its subordinate groups and squadrons re-designated as tactical airlift units.

On 13 May 1968, the 930th Tactical Airlift Group was activated for combat duty in the Vietnam War, and the 71st TAS's C-119 aircraft were selected for modification to the AC-119G gunship configuration. The airlift group and its Bakalar Reservists were reassigned to Lockbourne AFB, Ohio on 11 June. The 71st was subsequently re-designated as the 71st Air Commando Squadron (ACS) on 15 June, and on 5 December 1968, it deployed to Nha Trang Air Base, South Vietnam, where it was assigned to the 14th Special Operations Wing. Subsequently, re-designated as a Special Operations Squadron, the 71st flew combat operations in South Vietnam until 5 June 1969, when its reservists returned to the United States.

On 1 August 1968, the major command at Bakalar was changed from Continental Air Command (ConAc) to the Air Force Reserve (AFRES), at that time a field operating agency, with Tactical Air Command (TAC) as the operational gaining command. The 434th TAW remained a part of the Fifth Air Force Reserve Region.

On 25 June 1969, the 931st Tactical Airlift Group was re-designated as the 931st Tactical Air Support Group. Its 72d Tactical Airlift Squadron was re-designated and re-equipped with U-3A "Blue Canoe" light utility aircraft. The 931st TASG's mission was tactical air support. The group's C-119s were reassigned to the 71st Special Operations Squadron and modified to the AC-119G configuration.

== Military base closure ==
Bakalar Air Force Base was selected for closure in 1969, due to Stateside (Continental United States) base funding reductions to free up monies for Vietnam War combat operations. The 930th Special Operations Group was moved to Grissom Air Force Base, Indiana, where it became a Tactical Fighter Group in 1973, flying the A-37 Dragonfly. The 930th was inactivated on 1 July 1975. The 71st Air Commando Squadron was inactivated in 1973 and its AC-119s were retired; however, the squadron was later reactivated in 1987 as part of the new Air Force Special Operations Command (AFSOC) and now flies CV-22 Ospreys from Kirtland AFB, New Mexico.

The 931st Tactical Air Support Group and its O-2 Skymaster aircraft were moved to Grissom AFB in 1969. The group went through a number of changes over the years, but remains active as the 931st Air Refueling Wing at McConnell AFB, Kansas. Its operational component is the 72d Air Refueling Squadron, flying KC-135 Stratotankers.

The 434th Tactical Airlift Wing was inactivated on 31 December 1969, with the closure of Bakalar AFB, but it was later reactivated as the 434th Air Refueling Wing, and operates as the host wing at Grissom Air Reserve Base, Indiana, flying the KC-135 Stratotanker.

The U.S. Department of Defense closed Bakalar AFB in January 1970. The City of Columbus received the title to the property in 1972 and converted it into a municipal airport. In 1982 it was named Columbus Municipal Airport and continues to operate as a general aviation facility.

== Present-day use ==
The former Bakalar Air Force Base was converted to a first-class general aviation airport in 1972. Some of its original World War II-era USAAF and Cold War-era USAF buildings remain in use at the facility. In addition, the Atterbury/Bakalar Air Museum on the grounds of the municipal airport is "dedicated to the memory of all military and civilian personnel who served there."

In 1995, the local aviation board began a restoration of the former military air base. During the process, the board decided to dedicate one of the few remaining World War II-era buildings on the base to a war hero. The Atterbury Army Airfield's chapel was restored and named in honor of Women Airforce Service Pilot (WASP) Jean Lewellen Norbeck. Norbeck (1912–1944), a Columbus native, was one of thirty-eight WASPs who were killed in service during World War II, and the only woman from Bartholomew County, Indiana, killed in the line of duty. Stationed at Shaw Field (now Shaw AFB), South Carolina, Norbeck was a test pilot for planes that had been marked unsafe. On 16 October 1944, she was killed when the plane she was piloting crashed. The restored chapel was dedicated in her memory on 29 May 1998.

== See also ==
- Indiana World War II Army Airfields
