= Richard Shafle Freeman =

United States Army Air Corps officer (1907–1941)

- Born: June 22, 1907; Winamac, Indiana, U.S.
- Died: February 6, 1941 (aged 33); Trinity Range, near Lovelock, Nevada, U.S.
- Burial place: Winamac Cemetery, Winamac, Indiana
- Education: United States Military Academy (1930)
- Military career
- Allegiance: United States
- Branch: United States Army; United States Army Air Corps
- Service years: 1930–1941
- Rank: Captain
- Commands: Ladd Field, Alaska (first commanding officer)
- Known for: Namesake of Freeman Army Airfield
- Awards: Distinguished Flying Cross; Mackay Trophy (1939, shared)

Richard Shafle Freeman (June 22, 1907 – February 6, 1941) was a United States Army Air Corps officer and pilot. An early participant in the Army's 1934 air mail operations, a crew member of the 1939 Boeing XB-15 mercy flight to Chile that received the Mackay Trophy, and the first commanding officer of Ladd Field, Alaska, Freeman was killed in the crash of a Boeing B-17 Flying Fortress in Nevada in 1941. Freeman Army Airfield near Seymour, Indiana, later the site of the Freeman Field mutiny, was named in his honor.

== Early life and education ==
Freeman was born on June 22, 1907, in Winamac, the seat of Pulaski County, Indiana. He was appointed to the United States Military Academy at West Point and graduated with the class of 1930, receiving a commission in the Army and subsequently qualifying as a pilot in the Air Corps.

== Military career ==
=== Air mail operations ===
In 1934, Freeman flew mail routes for several months during the Army Air Corps' brief operation of domestic air mail service (AACMO), and was later characterized as one of the pioneers of the Army Air Mail Service.

=== 1939 Chile mercy flight and Mackay Trophy ===
On February 4–6, 1939, Freeman served as a crew member aboard the experimental Boeing XB-15 bomber, commanded by Major Caleb V. Haynes, on a humanitarian relief flight from Langley Field, Virginia, to Santiago, Chile, carrying American Red Cross vaccines and medical supplies for victims of the 1939 Chillán earthquake. The flight covered 4,933 statute miles with refueling stops in the Panama Canal Zone and Lima, Peru. The crew was awarded the 1939 Mackay Trophy for the most meritorious flight of the year by Air Corps personnel.

=== Ladd Field ===
Freeman helped establish Ladd Field near Fairbanks, Alaska, the Army's first airfield in the territory and the site of its Cold Weather Test Station, and served as the field's first commanding officer.

== Death ==
On February 6, 1941 — two years to the day after his arrival in Santiago on the Chile relief flight — Freeman was piloting Boeing B-17 Flying Fortress B-17B serial 38-216 from Ladd Field to Wright Field, Ohio, via Sacramento, carrying records and reports of the station's first winter of cold weather testing, when the aircraft struck the west slope of the Trinity Range approximately twelve miles west of Lovelock, Nevada. All eight men aboard were killed.Freeman was awarded the Distinguished Flying Cross. His body was returned to Winamac for burial in Winamac Cemetery.

== Legacy ==
War Department General Order Number 10, dated March 3, 1943, named the advanced twin-engine flying school then under construction near Seymour, Indiana, as Freeman Army Airfield in his honor. The field graduated more than 4,000 twin-engine pilots, hosted the Army's first helicopter pilot training school, and in 1945 was the scene of the Freeman Field mutiny, a landmark event in the desegregation of the U.S. military. It survives today as Freeman Municipal Airport.

At Ladd Field (now Fort Wainwright, Alaska), roads were named for Freeman and the members of his crew killed in the 1941 crash.

== Awards and decorations ==
- Distinguished Flying Cross
- Mackay Trophy, 1939 (shared, XB-15 Chile relief flight crew)

== See also ==
- Freeman Army Airfield
- Ladd Army Airfield
- 1939 Chillán earthquake
