= KBAK =

KBAK may refer to:

- KBAK-TV, a TV station in Bakersfield, California, United States
- Columbus Municipal Airport (Indiana), ICAO code KBAK
