= Robert Selway =

United States Army Air Forces officer (1902–1967)

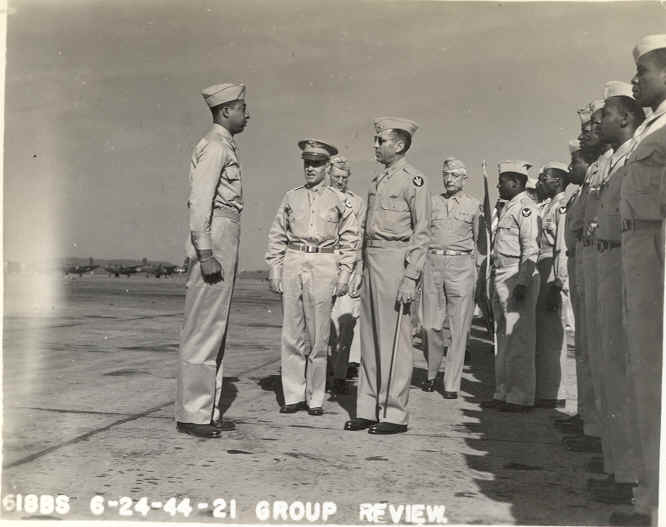
- Colonel Robert Selway reviews members of the 618th Bombardment Squadron at Atterbury Air Field in Indiana in 1944.
- Born: December 31, 1902; Wyoming
- Died: September 12, 1967 (aged 64); March Air Force Base, California
- Burial place: Arlington National Cemetery
- Military career
- Allegiance: United States of America
- Branch: United States Army Air Forces
- Rank: Colonel
- Commands: 477th Medium Bombardment Group
- Conflicts: World War II

Robert Roy Selway Jr. (December 31, 1902 – September 12, 1967) was a United States Army Air Forces officer best known for being the first commanding officer of the 477th Medium Bombardment Group of the Tuskegee Airmen during World War II and for his role in the Freeman Field mutiny.

== Biography ==
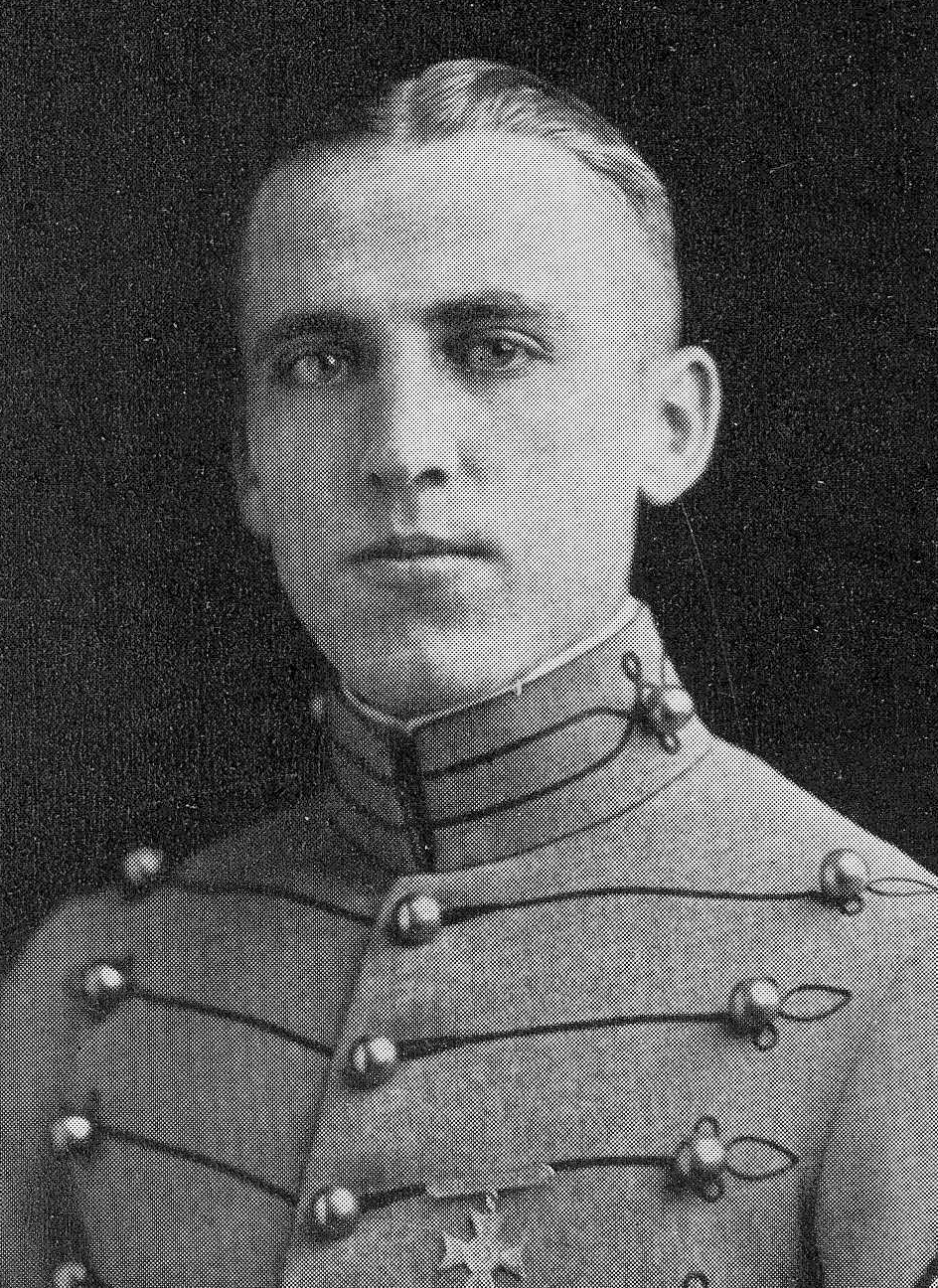
At West Point in 1924

Robert Selway was born in Wyoming on December 31, 1902. He graduated from the United States Military Academy at West Point in 1924.

He died at March Air Force Base on September 12, 1967.

== Freeman Field mutiny ==
On April 5, 1945, members of the all-black 477th Medium Bombardment Group protested Selway's segregation of Freeman Field's officer clubs by entering the club designated by Selway to be for "supervisory and instructor personnel" instead of the club designated for "trainees." Despite the experience of some of the group's members, Selway had classified all members of the 447th Bombardment Group as trainees, effectively segregating the officer clubs by race. 36 officers entered the first day and were arrested when they refused to leave, while 35 officers were arrested the next night.

Shortly after, Selway implemented Base Regulation 85–2, assigning specific housing, mess, and recreational facilities to officers. Selway proceeded to order each officer to sign a form confirming that they had read and understood the regulation. 101 of the 422 officers refused to sign, and were arrested for insubordination.

On April 23, General George Marshall ordered the 101 released, while General Henry H. Arnold transferred command of the 477th Bombardment Group to Colonel Benjamin O. Davis Jr.
