= Roger Terry =

Tuskeegee airman (1921–2009)

Lieutenant Roger Terry
- Roger Terry
- Born: August 13, 1921; Los Angeles California
- Died: June 11, 2009; West Los Angeles
- Military career
- Allegiance: United States of America
- Branch: United States Army Air Corps
- Rank: Lieutenant
- Nickname: Bill
- Unit: 332nd Fighter Group
- Awards: Congressional Gold Medal awarded to the Tuskegee Airmen

Lt. Roger "Bill" Terry (August 13, 1921 – June 11, 2009) from Los Angeles, California was one of the Tuskegee Airmen. He served in the U.S. Army Air Corps in World War II. He was dishonorably discharged after the Freeman Field Mutiny.

== Early life ==
Terry was from Los Angeles, California. Terry graduated from the University of California, Los Angeles where his roommate was the baseball player Jackie Robinson. Both Terry and Jackie Robinson would go on to be court-martialed for resisting segregation in the U.S. Armed forces.

== Career ==
Roger Terry (center) at Tuskegee Army Air Field, Dec 1944.

Terry joined the Tuskegee Airmen after graduating from UCLA in 1941. In February 1945 he graduated flight school and had the rank of 2nd Lieutenant. The Whites only officer's club was much better than the one afforded to the black officers. Terry and over 100 black officers were determined to integrate the white officer's club. A man who would go on to become Detroit's first black mayor Lt. Coleman Young was also one of protestors.

=== Freeman Field Mutiny ===
At Freeman Field in 1945, a large number of the Tuskegee Airmen attempted to integrate the all white officer's club. The black pilots were arrested and charged with insubordination. Terry was arrested for "jostling" one officer in the incident which later became known as the Freeman Field Mutiny.

Terry was charged with insubordination and also charged with getting physical with a white officer. The insubordination charge was not upheld, but he was convicted of getting physical with a white officer. His punishment was a $150 fine and a reduction in rank, and he was dishonorably discharged.

In 1995 the assistant secretary of the Air Force, Rodney Coleman removed disciplinary letters from the files of the Tuskegee airmen. He also removed Terry's court martial and dishonorable discharge and restored his rights and privileges.

Terry was said to have been proud of his behavior in the mutiny and subsequent court-martial.

=== After service ===
Terry earned a law degree and worked for the District Attorney of Los Angeles, California. He was active in Tuskegee Airmen causes and was also an advisor on the film Red Tails. In Los Angeles, Stanford Ave & E 28th St was named Roger Terry Square in his honor.

== Awards ==
- Congressional Gold Medal awarded to the Tuskegee Airmen in 2006

== Death ==
Terry died of heart failure on June 11, 2009. He was 87. He is buried at Inglewood Park Cemetery in Inglewood, California.

== See also ==
- Dogfights (TV series)
- Executive Order 9981
- Freeman Field Mutiny
- List of Tuskegee Airmen
- Military history of African Americans
- The Tuskegee Airmen (movie)
- Tuskegee Airmen
