= Stratton Hammon =

American architect (1904–1997)

Stratton Owen Hammon
- Born: March 6, 1904
- Died: October 22, 1997 (aged 93)
- Resting place: Cave Hill Cemetery; Louisville, Kentucky, U.S.
- Education: University of Louisville
- Occupation: Architect
- Military career
- Allegiance: United States
- Branch: U.S. Army Corps of Engineers
- Rank: Lieutenant colonel
- Conflicts: World War II

Stratton Owen Hammon (March 6, 1904 – October 22, 1997) was a Louisville, Kentucky, architect known for his Colonial Revival style homes.

== Life ==
Hammon was a graduate of DuPont Manual High School in Louisville, where he studied art and architectural drafting. He briefly studied architecture at the University of Louisville and learned the trade while working with a Louisville builder named Murphy. He opened his own architecture practice during the height of the Great Depression and is known for designing more than 100 distinctive homes in Kentucky, as well as house plans published in magazines such as Good Housekeeping, Better Homes and Gardens and McCall's throughout the United States. It is impossible to know how many homes were built based on these plans across various regions of the country.

He became the 30th registered architect in Kentucky in 1930 and later served as president of the Kentucky of the American Institute of Architects.

During World War II, Hammon served as a captain in the United States Army Corps of Engineers, supervising construction projects such as Columbus Air Support Base, soon to be called Bakalar Air Force Base, in Columbus, Indiana. He participated in the Normandy Invasion in June 1944 and also served as one of the Monuments Men at the close of the war. By the end of the war, he had risen to the rank of lieutenant colonel. The French government awarded him both the Croix de Guerre and the Legion of Honor for his efforts in France during World War II.

In 2007, the Speed Museum in Louisville mounted an exhibition of Hammon's work, and a book was published that same year containing photographs of many of his homes and a definitive record of his Kentucky commissions. Architectural historian Richard Guy Wilson has lectured on Hammon's work at the Filson Historical Society.

He is buried at Cave Hill Cemetery in Louisville.
