= Atterbury-Bakalar Air Museum =

- Location within Indiana
- Established: 1992
- Location: Columbus, Indiana
- Coordinates: 39.2549°N 85.8980°W
- Type: Aviation museum
- Founder: Wendell Ross
- Website: www.atterburybakalarairmuseum.org

The Atterbury-Bakalar Air Museum is an aviation museum located at the Columbus Municipal Airport in Columbus, Indiana.

== History ==
=== Background ===
In mid-1988, an F-4 was flown to the airport as a sling load underneath a helicopter and was placed on display a few months later.

=== Establishment ===
The museum's 3,168 sq ft (294.3 m^{2}) building was dedicated on 11 November 1992. The restoration of the former base chapel, renamed the Lewellen Memorial Chapel, was completed in 1998. It opened a new exhibit called A Century of Flight in 2003 featuring a 1:4 scale replica of the Wright Flyer.

The museum broke ground on the Bruce Dalton Media Center, the first half of a two part expansion, in July 2009. It began construction of a second, 3,700 sq ft (340 m^{2}) addition in July 2013. The addition opened in April 2014 along with a new barracks exhibit. Then, in 2017, it announced plans for an 1,800 sq ft (170 m^{2}) expansion to store artifacts and serve as a restoration shop. The Thomas Vickers/John C. Walter Artifacts & Restoration Center was dedicated in June 2018.

The museum acquired a C-119 from Greybull, Wyoming and began disassembling it in 2019. The last parts arrived in July of the following year and it was placed on display in May 2021.

== Exhibits ==
Exhibits at the museum include an airport beacon, a reproduction barracks, a CG-4A glider nose section. Local manufacturers such as Cosco Housewares, Cummins Engine Company, and Noblitt Sparks are also represented with displays of some of their products. Other objects include a motorized cutaway of an R-3350 engine. A collection of five 1:8 scale aircraft models hang from the ceiling.

== Collection ==
- Fairchild C-119 Flying Boxcar
- McDonnell F-4C Phantom II
