= Freeman Field mutiny =

Civil rights protest

Coordinates: 38.9247°N 85.9083°W

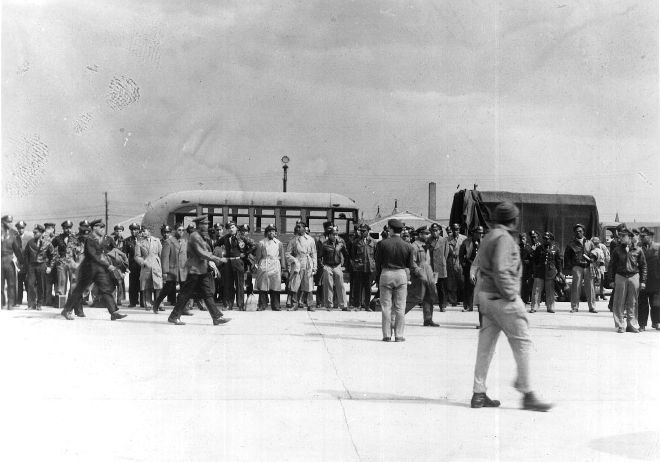
Arrested African-American officers of the 477th Bombardment Group at Freeman Field, Indiana, await transport to Godman Field, Kentucky, April 1945.

The Freeman Field mutiny was a series of incidents at Freeman Army Airfield, a United States Army Air Forces base near Seymour, Indiana, in 1945 in which African American members of the 477th Bombardment Group attempted to integrate an all-white officers' club. The mutiny resulted in 162 separate arrests of black officers, some of them twice. Three were court-martialed on relatively minor charges. One, Roger C. Terry, was convicted. In 1995, the Air Force officially vindicated the actions of the African-American officers, set aside the single court-martial conviction and removed letters of reprimand from the permanent files of 15 of the officers. The mutiny is generally regarded by historians of the Civil Rights Movement as an important step toward full integration of the armed forces and as a model for later efforts to integrate public facilities through civil disobedience.

== Background ==
=== The Tuskegee Airmen ===
Before and during World War II, the armed forces of the United States, like much of American society, were segregated by race. Historically, most African-American soldiers and sailors were relegated to support functions rather than combat roles, with few opportunities to advance to command positions.

In 1940, in response to pressure from prominent African-American leaders such as A. Philip Randolph and Walter White, President Franklin D. Roosevelt opened the United States Army Air Corps (after 1941, the United States Army Air Forces) to black men who volunteered to train as fighter pilots. The first of the black units, the 99th Fighter Squadron, trained at an airfield in Tuskegee, Alabama, which gave rise to the name "Tuskegee Airmen" as a blanket term for the Army's black aviators. Under the command of Colonel Benjamin O. Davis Jr., the first African American to fly solo as an officer, the 99th saw action in North Africa and Italy in 1943. In 1944, the 99th was assigned, with three other black squadrons, to form the 332d Fighter Group.

=== Origin of the 477th Bombardment Group (M) ===
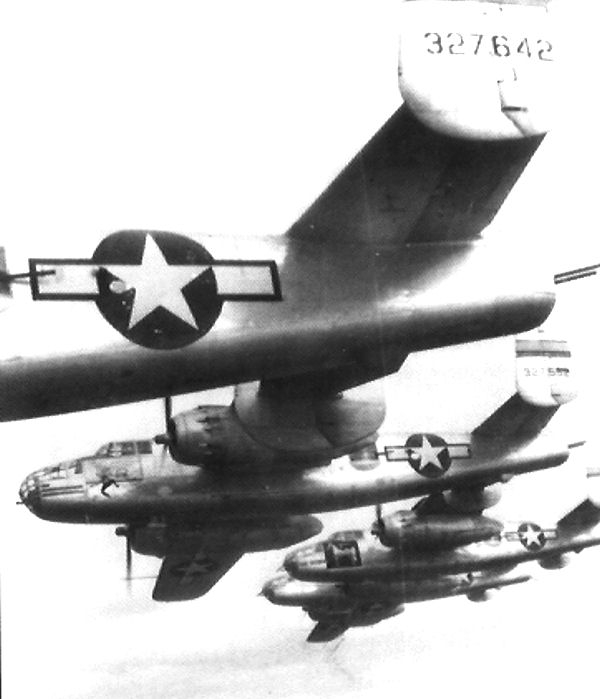
B-25J medium bombers of 380th Bombardment Squadron, 310th Bombardment Group begin their attack run over a target in Northern Italy in late 1944.

Continued pressure from African-American civilian leaders led the Army to let blacks train as members of bomber crews, a step that opened many more skilled combat roles to them. On January 15, 1944, the Army re-activated the 477th Bombardment Group (Medium) to train African-American aviators to fly the B-25J Mitchell twin-engine medium bomber in combat.

Under the command of Colonel Robert Selway, the 477th began training at Selfridge Field near Detroit, Michigan. Although the 477th had an authorized strength of 270 officer crew members, only 175 were initially assigned to Selfridge, a circumstance that led many of the black trainees to believe that the Army did not want the unit to advance to full combat readiness. All new air groups, however, activated during World War II began with a core cadre of officers around whom the entire group was subsequently built.

The 477th also suffered from morale problems stemming from segregation at Selfridge. Colonel Selway's superior, Major General Frank O'Driscoll Hunter, commander of the First Air Force, insisted on strict social segregation of black and white officers. Although Army Regulation 210–10, Paragraph 19, prohibited any public building on a military installation from being used "for the accommodation of any self-constituted special or exclusive group," thereby requiring officers' clubs be open to all officers regardless of race, the club at Selfridge was closed to black officers, a situation that led to an official War Department reprimand being issued to the Selfridge base commander, Colonel William Boyd.

=== Relocation of the 477th to Kentucky ===
On May 5, 1944, possibly out of fear of a repeat of the previous summer's race riot in nearby Detroit, the 477th was abruptly relocated to Godman Field at Fort Knox in Kentucky. Godman's only officers' club was open to blacks, but white officers used the club at Fort Knox on a "guest membership" basis. The morale of the 477th remained poor because the field was not suited for use by the B-25 and because black officers, including combat veterans of the 332nd Fighter Group who had transferred to the bomber unit, were not being advanced to command positions. By early 1945, however, the 477th reached its full combat strength: the 616th Bombardment Squadron, 617th Bombardment Squadron, 618th Bombardment Squadron, and 619th Bombardment Squadron. It was scheduled to enter combat on July 1, which made it necessary to relocate once more, this time to Freeman Army Airfield, a base fully suited to use by the B-25.

== The protest at Freeman Field ==
Location of Freeman Army Airfield, Indiana

=== The incidents of April 5th and 6th ===
The 477th began moving by train to Freeman Field on March 1, 1945. Word soon got back to the remaining African-American officers at Godman that Colonel Selway had created two separate officers' clubs at Freeman: Club Number One for use by "trainees," all of whom were black; and Club Number Two for use by "instructors," all of whom were white. Led by Second Lieutenant Coleman A. Young, the future mayor of Detroit and an experienced labor organizer, a group of black officers still at Godman decided on a plan of action to challenge the de facto segregation at Freeman as soon as they arrived there.

There had already been an attempt to integrate Club Number Two on March 10, when two groups of black officers entered it and were refused service; but the officers still at Godman decided to push the issue to the point of arrest if necessary. On April 5, the last of them left for Freeman. Arriving there late in the afternoon, they began to go in small groups to Club Number Two to seek service.

The first group of three officers was turned away by Major Andrew M. White, the officer in charge of the club; but later groups were met by the Officer of the Day, First Lieutenant Joseph D. Rogers, who was armed with a holstered .45 caliber weapon and who was stationed there on the orders of Colonel Selway. When 19 of the officers, including Coleman Young, entered the club against the instructions of Lieutenant Rogers and refused to leave, Major White put them in arrest "in quarters." In response to the arrest order, the 19 officers left the club and returned to their quarters. Seventeen more were placed under arrest later that night, including Second Lieutenant Roger C. Terry, who Lieutenant Rogers claimed had shoved him. The next night, 25 more officers acting in three groups entered the club and were also placed under arrest. Except for the alleged "shoving" incident, there was no use of physical force by anyone on either side. A total of 61 officers were arrested during the two-day protest.

=== Base Regulation 85-2 ===
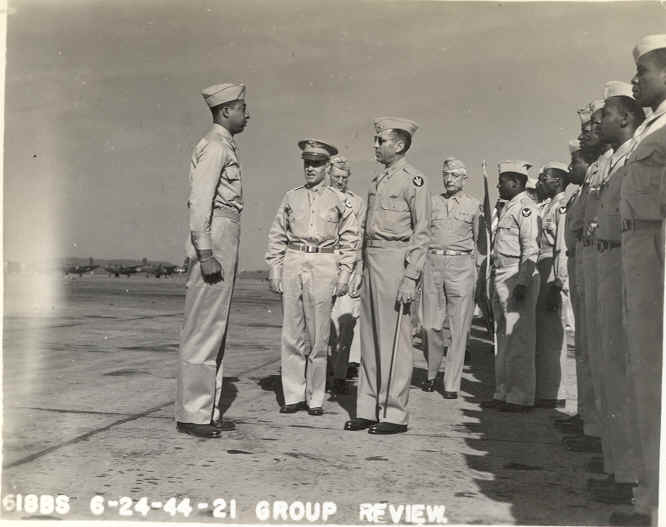
Colonel Robert Selway reviews members of the 618th Bombardment Squadron at Atterbury Air Field in Indiana in 1944.

After investigating the incidents of April 5 and 6, Colonel Torgils G. Wold, Air Inspector of the First Air Force, recommended dropping the charges against all of the officers except Lieutenant Terry and two others arrested with him. After consulting General Hunter, Colonel Selway accepted the recommendation and released the 58. Since the Air Inspector's recommendation was based on uncertainty about whether the order segregating the clubs had been properly drafted and published, Colonel Selway drafted a new order, Base Regulation 85–2, that he thought would meet all technical legal requirements.

To make sure that none of the African-American officers could deny knowledge of the new regulation, Colonel Selway had his deputy commander, Lieutenant Colonel John B. Pattison, assemble the trainees on April 10 and read them the regulation. After doing so, Colonel Pattison gave each officer a copy of the regulation and told them to sign a statement certifying that they had read it and fully understood it. No one signed. A subsequent effort by Captain Anthony A. Chiappe, commander of Squadron E, to coax 14 officers into signing produced only three signers. Finally, on the advice of Air Inspector Wold and a representative of the First Air Force Judge Advocate, Colonel Selway set up a board consisting of two black officers and two white officers to interview the non-signers individually and present them with the following options:

- sign the certification;
- write and sign their own individual certificates in which they did not have to acknowledge that they understood the regulation; or
- face arrest under the 64th Article of War for disobeying a direct order by a superior officer in time of war, an offence that technically could be punished by death.

The board carried out the interviews on April 11. One hundred and one officers refused to sign and were placed under arrest in quarters.

=== Release of the 101 ===
Roger Terry (center) at Tuskegee Army Air Field, Dec 1944.

The 101 arrestees were returned to Godman Field to await trial. In the meantime, pressure from African-American organizations, labor unions and members of Congress was brought to bear on the War Department to drop the charges against them. On orders from Army Chief of Staff General George C. Marshall, the 101 were released on April 23, although General Hunter placed an administrative reprimand in the file of each officer who had been arrested.

Photo of the officers who presided over the courts-martial with the Bureau of public Relations, War Department press release dated July 2, 1945.

The three officers accused of "jostling" or "shoving" Lieutenant Rogers on the night of April 5 received a general court-martial in July. Thurgood Marshall, future associate justice of the United States Supreme Court directed the defense, but did not himself appear for the defendants. Theodore M. Berry, future mayor of Cincinnati, Ohio, was lead defense counsel. He was assisted by Harold Tyler, a Chicago lawyer, and by Lieutenant William Thaddeus Coleman Jr., who later became the chief defense counsel of the National Association for the Advancement of Colored People and United States Secretary of Transportation under President Gerald Ford,

Ten officers appointed by General Hunter presided over the court-martial. They were Colonel Benjamin O. Davis Jr., Captain George L. Knox II, Captain James T. Wiley, captain John H. Duren, Captain Charles R. Stanton, captain William T. Yates, Captain Elmore M. Kennedy, Captain Fitzroy Newsum, 1st Lieutenant William Robert Ming Jr. and 1st Lieutenant James Y. Carter. Trial Judge Advocates were: Captain James W. Redden and 1st Lieutenant Charles R. Hall. As the senior officer Benjamin O. Davis Jr. was named president of the court. After a challenge Benjamin O. Davis Jr. was dismissed and Knox was named president. (Note: After Benjamin O. Davis Jr. was dismissed from the court after a challenge, Knox was named president. See historic photograph with press release in this section, and see news clipping in reference:)

Second Lieutenants Marsden A. Thompson and Shirley R. Clinton were acquitted. Lieutenant Terry was acquitted of the charge of disobeying an order, but was convicted of the charge of jostling Lieutenant Rogers, for which he was fined $150, payable in three monthly installments, suffered loss of rank and received a dishonorable discharge.

== Aftermath ==
As a result of the protest, the 477th was relocated back to Godman Field, and two of its four bomb squadrons (the 616th and 619th) inactivated. An all-black fighter squadron, the 99th FS, was added to the group, which was re-designated the 477th Composite Group on June 22, 1945. Colonel Benjamin O. Davis Jr., was appointed as commanding officer of the group on June 21, 1945, and took command on July 1. Black officers replaced white officers in subordinate command and supervisory positions. Training was to be completed by August 31, but the war ended on August 14th with Japan's surrender.

Never deployed in combat, the 477th Composite Group was downsized when the war ended. In 1946, it was reassigned to Lockbourne Field, now Rickenbacker International Airport and Rickenbacker Air National Guard Base, in Ohio. It was completely inactivated in 1947. Sixty years later, in 2007, it was reactivated as the 477th Fighter Group (477 FG), the first Air Force Reserve Command unit to fly the F-22 Raptor.

In 1948, President Harry S. Truman issued Executive Order 9981, racially integrating the United States Armed Services.

When Freeman Field was deactivated in 1948, 2,241 acres (9 km^{2}) of the former base became Freeman Municipal Airport; 240 acres (1.0 km^{2}) went for agricultural training in the Seymour Community Schools; and 60 acres (240,000 m^{2}) became an industrial park.

In 1995, in response to requests from some of the veterans of the 477th, the Air Force officially removed General Hunter's letters of reprimand from the permanent files of 15 of the 104 officers charged in the Freeman Field protest and promised to remove the remaining 89 letters when requests were filed. Roger Terry received a full pardon, restoration of rank and a refund of his fine.

The events at Freeman Field, along with his own experiences in the USAAF, were the basis of the novel Guard of Honor (ISBN 0-679-60305-0), for which James Gould Cozzens won the Pulitzer Prize for Fiction in 1949.

== See also ==
- African-American mutinies in the United States Armed Forces
- Battle of Bamber Bridge
