= 477th Fighter Group =

US Air Force Reserve unit

477th Fighter Group

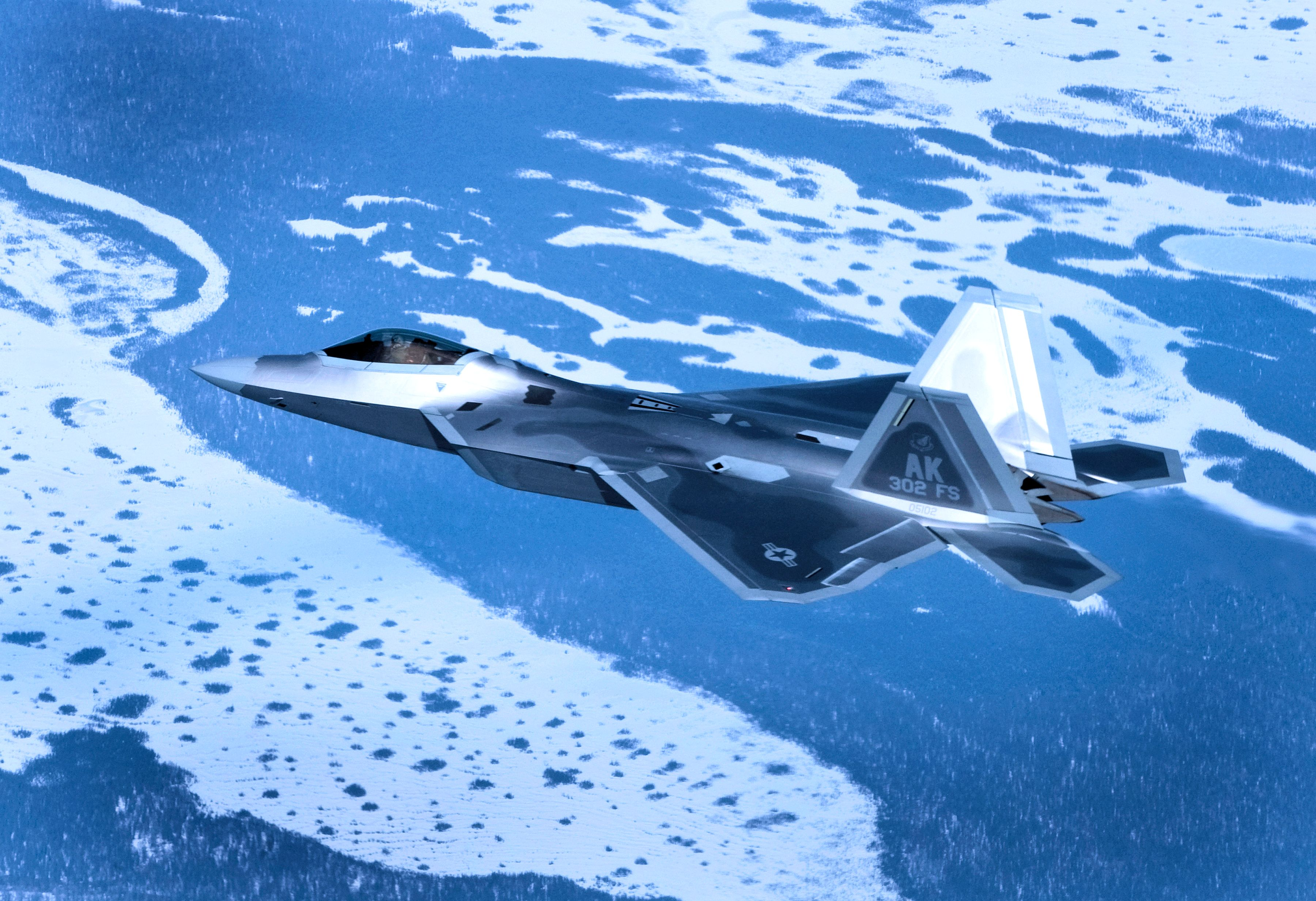
- F-22 Raptor of the 477th Fighter Group over Anchorage, Alaska in 2008.
- Active: 1943; 1944–1947; 2007–present
- Country: United States
- Branch: United States Air Force
- Role: Fighter
- Part of: Air Force Reserve Command
- Garrison/HQ: Joint Base Elmendorf–Richardson, Alaska
- Mottos: Our Hearts with our Country, our Eyes on the Target (World War II)
- Decorations: Air Force Outstanding Unit Award

Commanders
- Current Commander: Col Jeremy Weihrich
- Notable commanders: Benjamin O. Davis, Jr.

Insignia
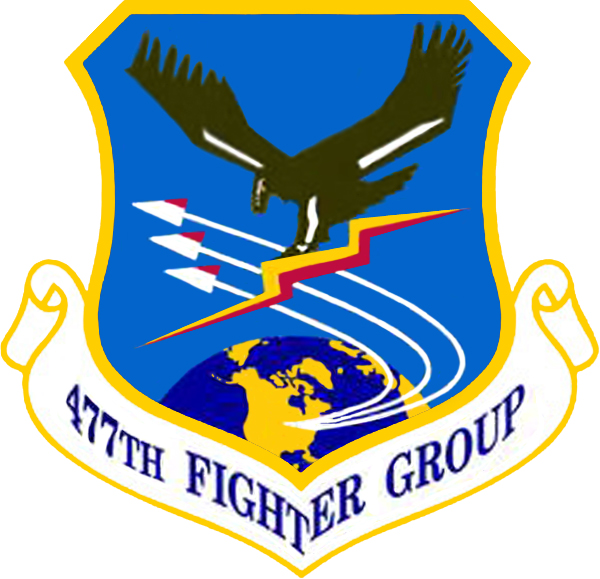
- 477th Fighter Group emblem (Note: Approved 5 October 2007.)

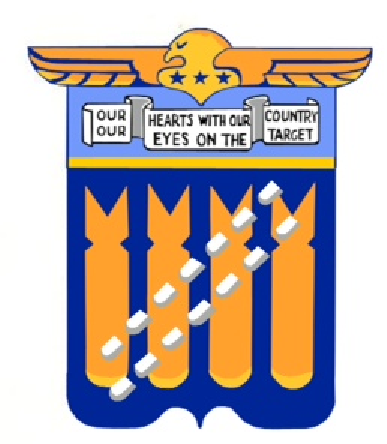
- 477th Bombardment Group emblem

Aircraft flown
- Fighter: Lockheed Martin F-22A Raptor

The 477th Fighter Group is an Air Reserve unit of the United States Air Force. It is assigned to the Tenth Air Force, Air Force Reserve Command, stationed at Joint Base Elmendorf–Richardson, Alaska. The group is an associate unit of the 3rd Wing of Pacific Air Forces (PACAF), and if mobilized the wing is gained by PACAF.

== Overview ==
The 477th Fighter Group was reactivated on 1 October 2007 as the first Air Force Reserve unit to fly, maintain, and support the Lockheed Martin F-22 Raptor. The group is an associate unit responsible for recruiting, training, developing and retaining Citizen Airmen to support 3d Wing and Air Force expeditionary unit mission requirements.

== Units ==
The 477th Fighter Group provides a combat-ready force of approximately 425 Air Reserve Technicians, Traditional Reservists, and civil servants assigned to the following squadrons:

- 302nd Fighter Squadron
- 477th Aircraft Maintenance Squadron
- 477th Maintenance Squadron
- 477th Civil Engineer Squadron
- 477th Aerospace Medicine Flight
- 477th Mission Support Flight
- 477th Operations Support Flight
- 477th Force Support Squadron

The men and women of the 477th Fighter Group will functionally integrate with their active duty Air Force partners in almost all F-22A mission areas to increase efficiency and overall combat capability while retaining Reserve administrative support and career enhancement. The 477th Fighter Group will leverage the traditional Reserve Component strengths of experience and continuity to fly, fight, and win as Unrivaled Wingmen on the Total Force team at Elmendorf.

== History ==
=== World War II Training unit ===
The 477th was originally established in May 1943 at MacDill Field, Florida as the United States Army Air Forces 477th Bombardment Group (Medium). Assigned to Third Air Force, the group trained with Martin B-26 Marauder medium bombers. The unit was subsequently inactivated on 25 August 1943.

=== Reactivation with African-American personnel ===
The 477th was reactivated as the 477th Bombardment Group (M) (Colored) at Selfridge Field, Michigan on 15 January 1944 and assigned to First Air Force. The 477th's new mission was to train what would become the legendary World War II African-American aviators known as the Tuskegee Airmen with Republic P-47 Thunderbolt fighters and North American B-25 Mitchell bombers. During World War II, continued pressure from African-American civilian leaders led the Army to let black servicemen train as members of bomber crews, a step that opened many more skilled combat roles to them.

On 5 May 1944, possibly out of fear of a repeat of the previous summer's race riot in nearby Detroit, the 477th was abruptly relocated to Godman Field on Fort Knox in Kentucky.

The morale of the 477th was poor because the field was not suited to be used by the B-25 and because black officers, including combat veterans of the 332nd Fighter Group who had transferred to the bomber unit, were not being advanced to command positions. By early 1945, however, the 477th reached its full combat strength. It was scheduled to enter combat on 1 July, which made it necessary to relocate once more, this time to Freeman Field, a base fully suited to use the B-25.

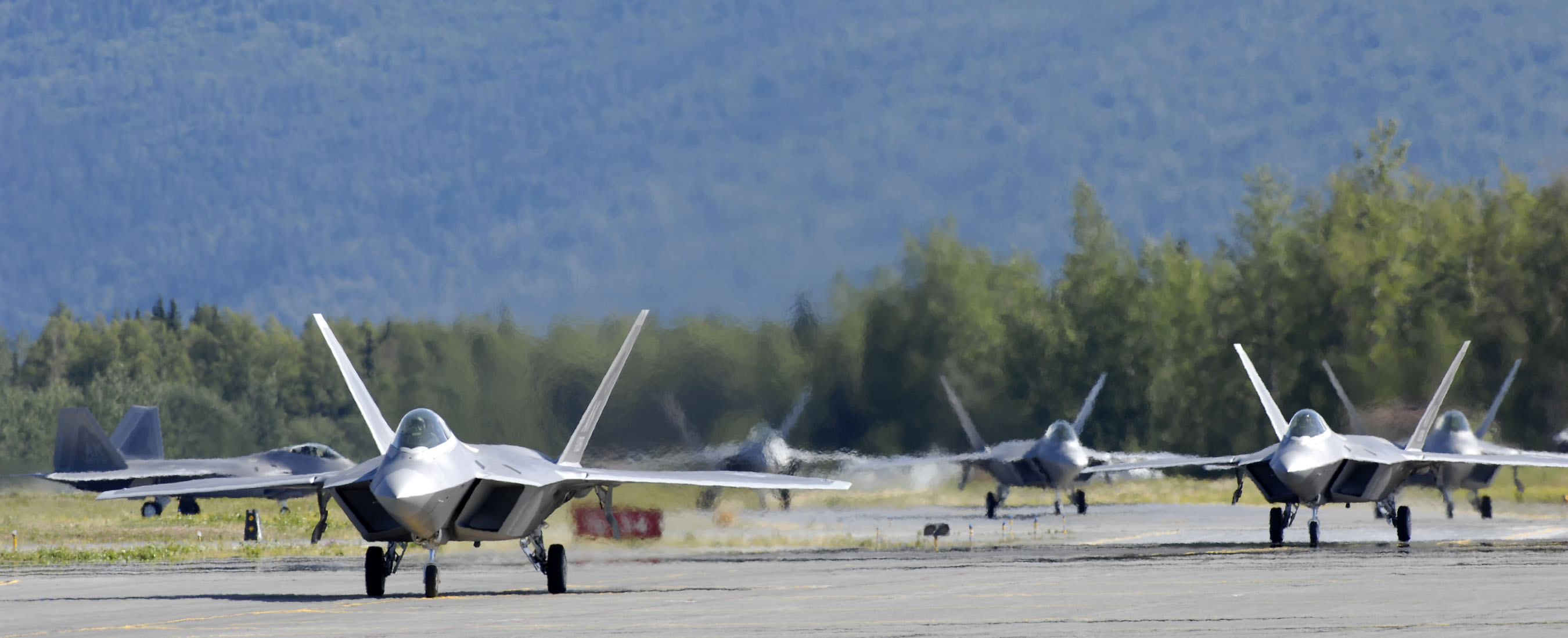
Six F-22 Raptors taxi following touchdown at Elmendorf Air Force Base, Alaska, during a ceremony marking the aircraft's arrival 8 August 2007. The F-22s will join the active duty 3d Wing and Air Force Reserve Command's 477th Fighter Group here. The 477th FG becomes the first Air Force Reserve unit to operate and maintain the F-22. (U.S. Air Force photo/Tech. Sgt. Keith Brown).

At Freeman Field, the Freeman Field Mutiny took place as a result of racial discrimination. As a result of the protest, the 477th was relocated back to Godman Field. Colonel Benjamin O. Davis, Jr., took command on 1 July, and black officers replaced white officers in lower command and supervisory positions. Training was to be completed by 31 August, but the war ended on 14 August with Japan's surrender.

Never deployed in combat, the 477th was downsized when the war ended. In 1946, it moved to Lockbourne Army Air Base, Ohio. On 1 July 1947, the 477th was inactivated.

== Lineage ==
- Established as the 477th Bombardment Group (Medium) on 13 May 1943

Activated on 1 June 1943
Inactivated on 25 August 1943

- Activated as the 477th Bombardment Group, Medium) (Colored) on 15 January 1944

Redesignated 477th Composite Group on 22 June 1945
Inactivated on 1 July 1947

- Redesignated: 477th Special Operations Group on 31 July 1985 (remained inactive)
- Redesignated: 477th Expeditionary Special Operations Group and converted to provisional status on 24 January 2005
- Redesignated: 477th Special Operations Group and withdrawn from provisional status on 11 August 2006
- Redesignated: 477th Fighter Group on 21 September 2007

Activated on 1 October 2007

=== Assignments ===
- Third Air Force, 1 June – 25 August 1943
- First Air Force, 15 January 1944
- Ninth Air Force, 1 January–1 July 1947
- Air Force Special Operations Command to activate or inactivate at any time after 24 January 2005 – 11 August 2006
- Tenth Air Force, 1 October 2007 – present

=== Components ===
- 99th Fighter Squadron: 22 June 1945 – 1 July 1947
- 302nd Fighter Squadron: 1 October 2007 – present
- 616th Bombardment Squadron: 1 June–25 August 1943; 15 January 1944 – 22 June 1945
- 617th Bombardment Squadron: 1 June–25 August 1943; 15 April 1944 – 1 July 1947
- 618th Bombardment Squadron: 1 June–25 August 1943; 15 May 1944 – 8 October 1945
- 619th Bombardment Squadron: 1 June–25 August 1943; 27 May 1944 – 22 June 1945

=== Stations ===
- MacDill Field, Florida, 1 Jun – 25 August 1943
- Selfridge Field, Michigan, 15 January 1944
- Godman Field, Kentucky, 6 May 1944
- Freeman Field, Indiana, 5 March 1945
- Godman Field, Kentucky, 26 April 1945
- Lockbourne Army Air Base, Ohio, 13 March 1946 – 1 July 1947
- Elmendorf Air Force Base, Alaska (later Joint Base Elmendorf-Richardson), 1 October 2007 – present

== See also ==
- Roger Terry

== Notes ==
Explanatory notes

Citations

=== Bibliography ===
- Maurer, Maurer, ed. (1983) [1961]. Air Force Combat Units of World War II (PDF) (reprint ed.). Washington, DC: Office of Air Force History. ISBN 0-912799-02-1. LCCN 61060979. Archived from the original (PDF) on 20 December 2016.
- Maurer, Maurer, ed. (1982) [1969]. Combat Squadrons of the Air Force, World War II (PDF) (reprint ed.). Washington, DC: Office of Air Force History. ISBN 0-405-12194-6. LCCN 70605402. OCLC 72556.
- James C. Warren, The Freeman Field Mutiny, San Rafael, CA:Donna Ewald, Publisher, 1995. ISBN 0-9641067-2-8; republished in an expanded edition as The Tuskegee Airmen Mutiny at Freeman Field, Vacaville, CA:Conyers Publishing Company, 1996. ISBN 0-9660818-0-3
