= Freeman Municipal Airport =

Airport in Indiana, United States

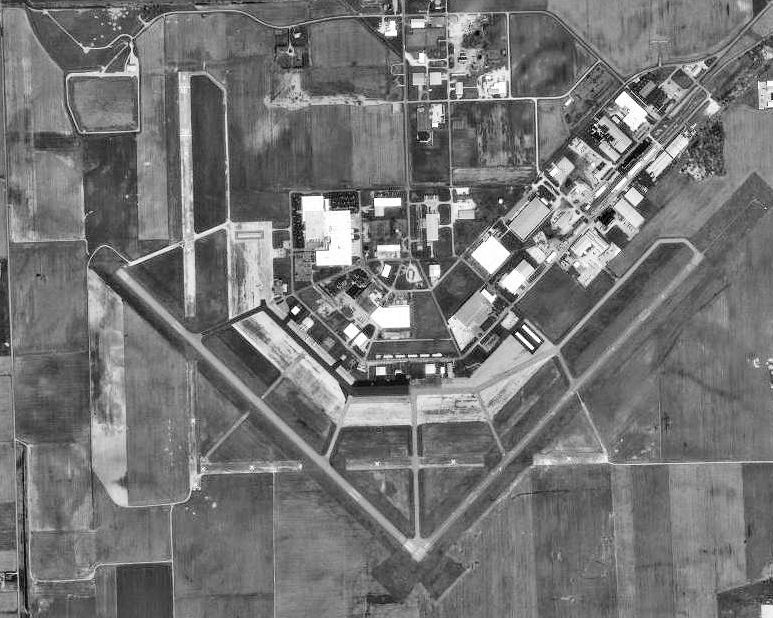
- USGS 3-27-1998 orthophoto
- IATA: SER; ICAO: KSER; FAA LID: SER

Summary
- Airport type: Public
- Owner: Seymour Airport Authority
- Serves: Seymour, Indiana
- Elevation AMSL: 583 ft (178 m)
- Coordinates: 38°55′31″N 85°54′25″W

Map
- Location of airport in Indiana SER (the United States)

Runways
Direction	Length		Surface
Direction	ft	m	Surface
5/23	6,001	1,829	Asphalt
14/32	5,502	1,677	Asphalt
18U/36U	1,215	370	Turf
9U/27U	1,104	336	Turf

Statistics
- Aircraft operations (2017): 20,786
- Based aircraft (2022): 67
- Source: Federal Aviation Administration

Freeman Municipal Airport (IATA: SER, ICAO: KSER, FAA LID: SER) is a public use airport located two nautical miles (4 km) southwest of the central business district of Seymour, a city in Jackson County, Indiana, United States. It is owned by the Seymour Airport Authority. This airport is included in the National Plan of Integrated Airport Systems for 2021–2025, which categorized it as a general aviation facility.

== History ==
Established by the United States Army Air Forces in 1942 as Freeman Army Airfield, it became first USAAF helicopter training school in June 1944. Black aviators, including a group of Tuskegee Airmen, trained at Freeman Field. In April 1945, several black officers tried to integrate an officers' club resulting in what became known as the "Freeman Field Mutiny". The mutiny is generally regarded by historians of the Civil Rights Movement as an important step toward full integration of the armed forces and as a model for later efforts to integrate public facilities through civil disobedience.

After the end of World War II, Freeman AAF became a storage depot of many captured German and Italian aircraft (Operation Lusty). Training at the field had stopped and it became the site for the storage of American and foreign aircraft. Freeman Field was closed and declared surplus on December 30, 1946. It was deactivated in November 1948 and turned over to local civilian authorities for use as a civil airport.

The airport announced plans for new t-hangars in 2022.

== Facilities and aircraft ==
Freeman Municipal Airport covers an area of 2,100 acres (850 ha) at an elevation of 583 feet (178 m) above sea level. It has two asphalt paved runways: 14/32 is 5,502 by 100 feet (1,677 x 30 m) and 5/23 is 6,001 by 100 feet (1,829 x 30 m). It also has two unpaved turf runways: 18U/36U is 1,200 by 100 feet (366 x 30 m) and 9U/27U is 1,000 by 100 feet (305 x 30 m).

For the 12-month period ending December 31, 2017, the airport had 20,786 aircraft operations, an average of 57 per day: 78% general aviation, 21% air taxi and 1% military. In April 2022, there were 67 aircraft based at this airport: 42 single-engine, 8 multi-engine, 2 helicopter and 15 gliders.

== See also ==
- List of airports in Indiana
