= 917th Air Refueling Squadron =

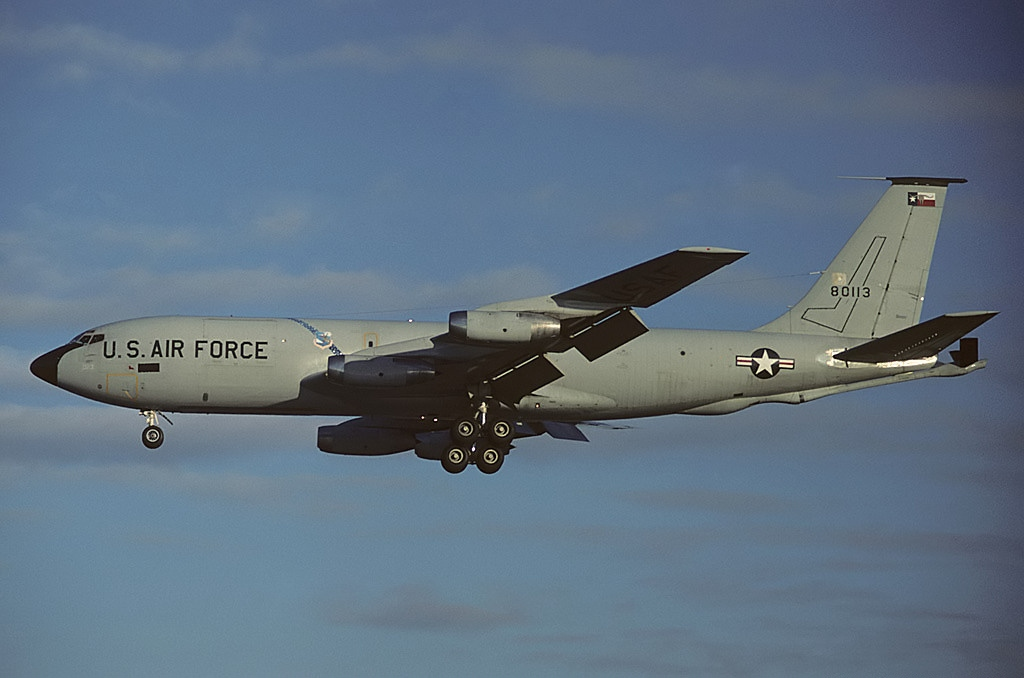
- Squadron Boeing KC-135A Stratotanker deploying to RAF Fairford (Note: Aircraft is Boeing KC-135A-BN Stratotanker, serial 58-0113. It was later converted to KC-135R. Baugher, Joe (6 May 2023). "1958 USAF Serial Numbers". Joe Baugher.)
- Active: 1943; 1944–1947; 1958–1994
- Country: United States
- Branch: United States Air Force
- Role: Air Refueling
- Motto: Ante Optimas (Latin for 'Before the Best') (Note: 917th Air Refueling Squadron. The motto can also be translated "In front of the best ones" and seen as referring to the position of squadron tankers when refueling tactical aircraft.) (After 1958)
- Decorations: Air Force Outstanding Unit Award

Insignia
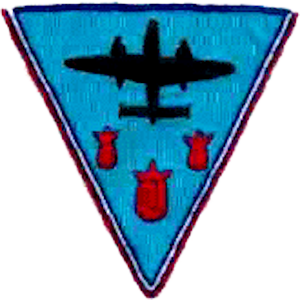
- 617th Bombardment Squadron emblem (Note: Approved 18 August 1944. Description: On a light turquoise blue triangle, point to base, bordered dark blue on base leg and on sides terminating in apex triparted red, white, and blue, a dark blue plan view, silhouette B-25 aircraft in center chief point, over three red aerial bombs trimmed dark blue, falling toward base point, in perspective.)

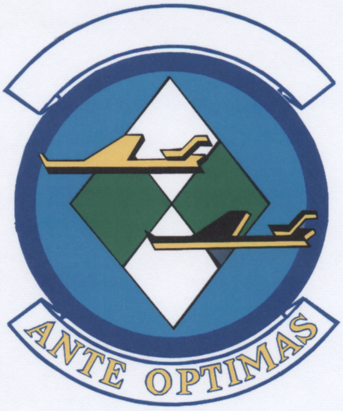
- 917th Air Refueling Squadron emblem

The 917th Air Refueling Squadron is an inactive United States Air Force unit. It was last active as a Geographically Separated Unit at Dyess Air Force Base, Texas, while assigned to the 43d Operations Group at Malmstrom Air Force Base, Montana, where it was inactivated on 1 July 1994.

The squadron was first activated in 1943 as the 617th Bombardment Squadron, one of the four squadrons of the 477th Bombardment Group, but the squadron was soon inactivated. In 1944 the group was again activated as the first (and only) bombardment group in the United States Army Air Forces to include black pilots. Members of the squadron participated in the Freeman Field Mutiny, protesting racial segregation in the military. The squadron was inactivated in 1945 after the 477th became a composite group that included bombardment and fighter squadrons.

In May 1959, the 917th Air Refueling Squadron was activated at Biggs Air Force Base, Texas. Beginning in 1960, the squadron began to stand alert with its Boeing KC-135A Stratotankers. It continued to maintain an alert commitment at Biggs, and later at Dyess Air Force Base, Texas until the end of the Cold War.

On 19 September 1985, The 917th Air Refueling Squadron was consolidated with the 617th Bombardment Squadron. With the inactivation of Strategic Air Command in 1992, the squadron transferred to Air Mobility Command, but two years later it was inactivated.

== History ==
=== World War II ===
The 617th Bombardment Squadron was activated in June 1943 at MacDill Field, Florida. as one of the four original squadrons of the 477th Bombardment Group, but was never fully manned and was inactivated in August.

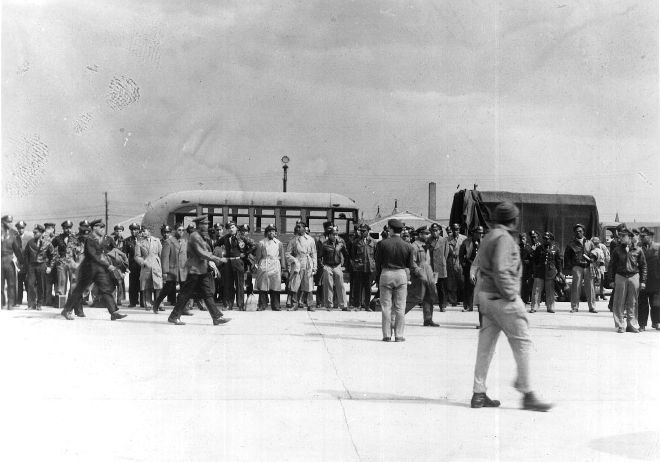
Officers of the 477th Bombardment Group at Freeman Field, Indiana, about to board air transports to take them to Godman Field, Kentucky. (Note: The officers were under arrest for refusing to sign a document acknowledging that they had read a regulation denying them access to an all-white officers' club.)

The 477th group was reactivated in January 1944 at Selfridge Field, Michigan as the "first colored bombardment group in the Army Air Forces" with personnel drawn from Selfridge and from Tuskegee Army Air Field, Alabama. It was the second combat group to be activated with African American personnel and would be the only African-American bombardment group. The group moved to Godman Field, Kentucky, just after 617th was activated in April. The unit encountered problems attributed to the lack of experienced personnel, which required even basic training in military occupational specialties to be conducted within the unit, rather than at technical training schools.

Although designated a "colored" squadron, some officers, including the squadron leadership were white. The initial commander of the 477th group enforced racial segregation on the posts where the squadron was stationed. The squadron's members were involved in the civil rights action referred to as the Freeman Field Mutiny; the "mutiny" came about when African-American aviators became outraged enough by racial segregation in the military that they resorted to mass insistence that military regulations prohibiting discrimination be enforced. The Freeman Field Mutiny was a crucial event in the African-American struggle for equal civil rights.

In 1945 after the 477th became a composite group formed of the 99th Fighter Squadron and the 617th Bombardment Squadron, Colonel Benjamin O. Davis, Jr., a black officer, assumed command of the group. The squadron was inactivated in 1947 when the 477th was replaced by the 332d Fighter Group.

=== Cold War ===
The 917th Air Refueling Squadron was activated on 1 May 1959 by Strategic Air Command (SAC) at Biggs Air Force Base, Texas and equipped with KC-135 Stratotankers. This was part of SAC's program to disperse its Boeing B-52 Stratofortress bombers over a larger number of bases, thus making it more difficult for the Soviet Union to knock out the entire fleet with a surprise first strike. When the squadron was activated, the 95th wing was in the process of converting from the Convair B-36 Peacemaker to the B-52 and the 917th's tankers were briefly the only operational aircraft assigned to the wing. Starting in 1960, one third of the squadron's aircraft were maintained on fifteen-minute alert, fully fueled and ready for combat to reduce vulnerability to a Soviet missile strike. This was increased to half the squadron's aircraft in 1962. The 917th continued to maintain an alert commitment when not deployed until the end of the Cold War.

The squadron mission was to provide air refueling to the B-52 Stratofortress strategic bombers of its parent 95th Bombardment Wing and other USAF units as directed. This included support for Operation Chrome Dome missions. The squadron was also tasked from time to time to perform other missions, including emergency aeromedical evacuation flights. In its first year of operation, the squadron was named the best refueling unit in SAC at the annual bombing/navigation competition. The squadron supported reflex deployments to forward Tanker Task Forces beginning in 1960, including deployments to Eielson Air Force Base, Alaska and the Alaskan Task Force. The squadron also supported the European and Pacific Tanker Task Forces. During the Vietnam War, the squadron deployed to the Pacific to support Operation Arc Light and the Young Tiger Task Force.

In 1965, the 431st Air Refueling Squadron, a Tactical Air Command unit stationed at Biggs and flying Boeing KB-50J Superfortress aircraft was inactivated. To accommodate the loss of refueling capability caused by the inactivation of the 421st, the 917th's strength was increased by five additional KC-135As.

SAC had planned to move the squadron from Biggs almost as soon as it was activated. In 1960, plans were made to move the unit to Grand Forks Air Force Base, North Dakota, then to Glasgow Air Force Base, Montana. In 1961, it was to be moved to March Air Force Base, California. But each move was cancelled and the unit remained at Biggs. Finally, at the beginning of 1965, the 917th moved to Dyess Air Force Base, Texas and fifteen days later was reassigned to the 96th Strategic Aerospace Wing. The squadron remained at Dyess until 1994 when the squadron's KC-135As were retired.

In 1985, the 96th wing converted from the B-52 to the Rockwell B-1B Lancer and the unit focused on training on techniques for refueling the new bomber. Later that year, the 917th Air Refueling Squadron and the 617th Bombardment Squadron were consolidated.

Six of the squadron's aircraft and associated crews deployed to Southwest Asia in the fall of 1990 to support Operation Desert Shield.

In September 1991 SAC implemented the Objective Wing reorganization and the wing's operational squadrons, including the 917th, were assigned to the 96th Operations Group. The assignment lasted only until June 1992, when Air Mobility Command took over the air refueling mission from SAC, and the squadron was reassigned to the 43d Operations Group, which was located at Malmstrom Air Force Base, Montana, although the squadron remained at Dyess until 1994, when it was inactivated.

== Lineage ==
617th Bombardment Squadron

- Constituted as the 617th Bombardment Squadron (Medium) on 13 May 1943

Activated on 1 June 1943
Inactivated on 25 August 1943
Activated on 15 May 1944
Inactivated on 1 July 1947

- Consolidated with the 917th Air Refueling Squadron as the 917th Air Refueling Squadron on 19 September 1985

917th Air Refueling Squadron

- Constituted as the 917th Air Refueling Squadron, Heavy on 9 March 1959

Activated on 1 May 1959

- Consolidated with the 617th Bombardment Squadron on 19 September 1985

Redesignated 917th Air Refueling Squadron on 1 September 1991
Inactivated on 1 July 1994

=== Assignments ===
- 477th Bombardment Group: 1 June 1943 – 25 August 1943
- 477th Bombardment Group (later 477th Composite Group): 15 May 44 – 1 July 1947
- 95th Bombardment Wing: 1 May 1959 (attached to 96th Strategic Aerospace Wing after 1 January 1965)
- 96th Strategic Aerospace Wing (later 96th Bombardment Wing): 15 January 1965
- 96th Operations Group, 1 September 1991
- 43d Operations Group, 1 June 1992 – 1 July 1994

=== Stations ===
- MacDill Field, Florida: 1 June 1943 – 25 August 1943
- Selfridge Field, Michigan: 15 April 1944
- Godman Field, Kentucky: 15 May 1944
- Sturgis Army Air Field, Kentucky: 22 July 1944
- Godman Field, Kentucky: 23 August 1944
- Freeman Field, Indiana: 6 March 1945
- Godman Field, Kentucky: 26 April 1945
- Lockbourne Army Air Base, Ohio: 13 March 1946 – 1 July 1947
- Biggs Air Force Base, Texas, 1 May 1959
- Dyess Air Force Base. Texas, 1 January 1965 – 1 July 1994

=== Aircraft ===
- Martin B-26 Marauder, 1943
- North American B-25 Mitchell, 1944–1947
- Boeing KC-135A, 1959–1994

=== Awards and campaigns ===
Award streamer	Award	Dates	Notes
	Air Force Outstanding Unit Award	1 July 1974 – 30 June 1975	917th Air Refueling Squadron
	Air Force Outstanding Unit Award	1 June 1987 – 30 June 1988	917th Air Refueling Squadron
	Air Force Outstanding Unit Award	30 May 1990 – 29 May 1992	917th Air Refueling Squadron

Campaign Streamer	Campaign	Dates	Notes
	American Theater without inscription	1 June 1943 – 25 August 1943, 15 May 1944 – 2 March 1946	617th Bombardment Squadron

== See also ==
- Tuskegee Airmen
- List of United States Air Force air refueling squadrons
- List of Martin B-26 Marauder operators
