= Columbus Municipal Airport (Indiana) =

Airport in Columbus, Indiana, United States of America

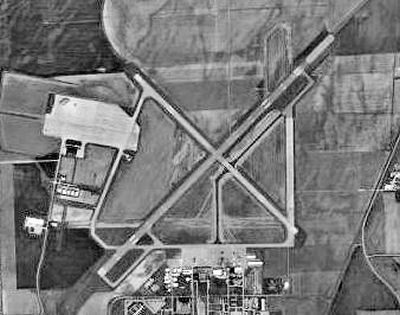
- USGS photo - 7 Aug 1997

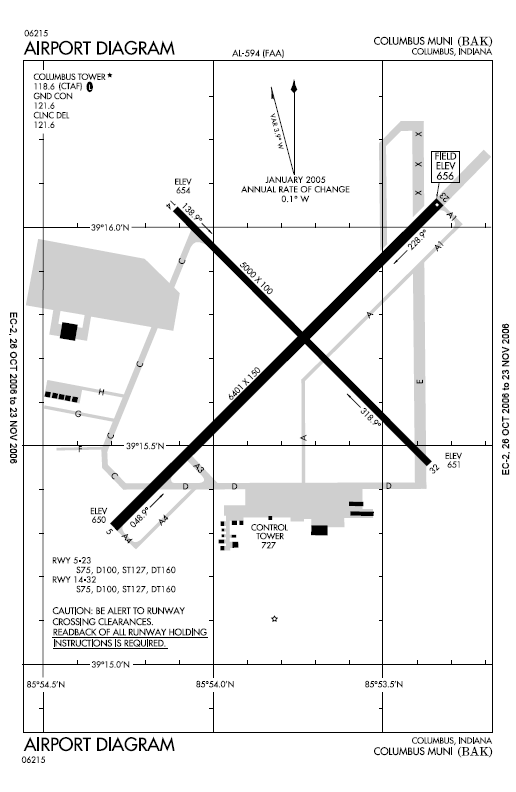
- FAA diagram
- IATA: CLU; ICAO: KBAK; FAA LID: BAK

Summary
- Airport type: Public
- Owner: City of Columbus
- Location: Columbus, Indiana
- Elevation AMSL: 656 ft (200 m)
- Coordinates: 39°15′43″N 085°53′47″W

Map
- Location of airport in Indiana/United States BAK (the United States)

Runways
Direction	Length		Surface
Direction	ft	m	Surface
5/23	6,400	1,951	Concrete
14/32	5,000	1,524	Concrete

Statistics
- Aircraft operations (2005): 39,155
- Based aircraft (2015): 77
- Source: Federal Aviation Administration

For the military use of this facility, see Bakalar Air Force Base.

Columbus Municipal Airport (IATA: CLU, ICAO: KBAK, FAA LID: BAK) is three miles north of Columbus, in Bartholomew County, Indiana, United States.

Most U.S. airports use the same three-letter location identifier for the FAA and IATA, but this airport is BAK to the FAA and CLU to the IATA.

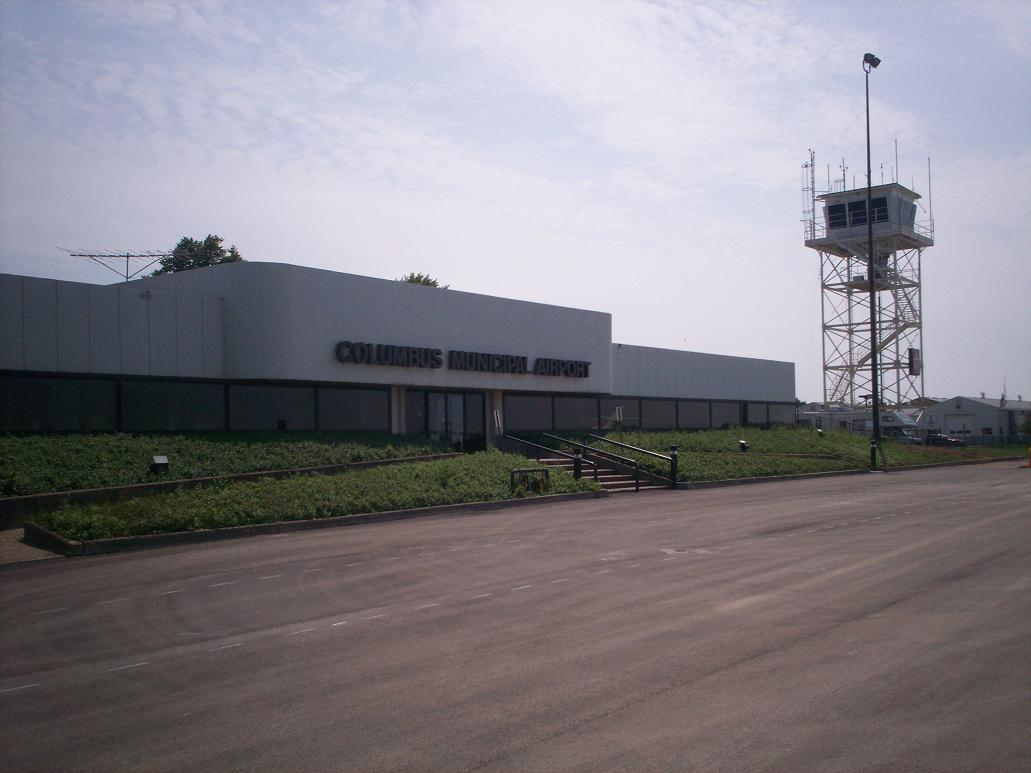
Airport terminal and control tower

== History ==
The airport is on the site of the former World War II Atterbury Army Airfield, a U.S. Army Air Forces facility, and Bakalar Air Force Base, a Cold War-era U.S. Air Force installation utilized primarily by the Air Force Reserve. It was the host base for the 434th Troop Carrier Wing twice, from 1949 to 1952 and again from 1953 to 1969.

A Douglas DC-3 at the airport was destroyed in a wind storm in May 2022.

== Facilities ==
Columbus Municipal Airport covers 2,000 acres (810 ha) at an elevation of 656 feet (200 m). It has two concrete runways: 5/23 is 6,400 by 150 feet (1,951 x 46 m) and 14/32 is 5,000 by 100 feet (1,524 x 30 m).

In 2005 the airport had 39,155 aircraft operations, average 107 per day: 91% general aviation and 9% military. In 2015, 77 aircraft were based at the airport: 58 single-engine, 8 multi-engine, 7 jet, 2 helicopter, 1 glider and 1 ultra-light.

The Atterbury-Bakalar Air Museum is located at the airport.

=== Terminal ===
The airport completely renovated its terminal building in 2015.

== See also ==
- List of airports in Indiana
