= Freeman Army Airfield =

Former US military facility

- Located in: Seymour, Indiana
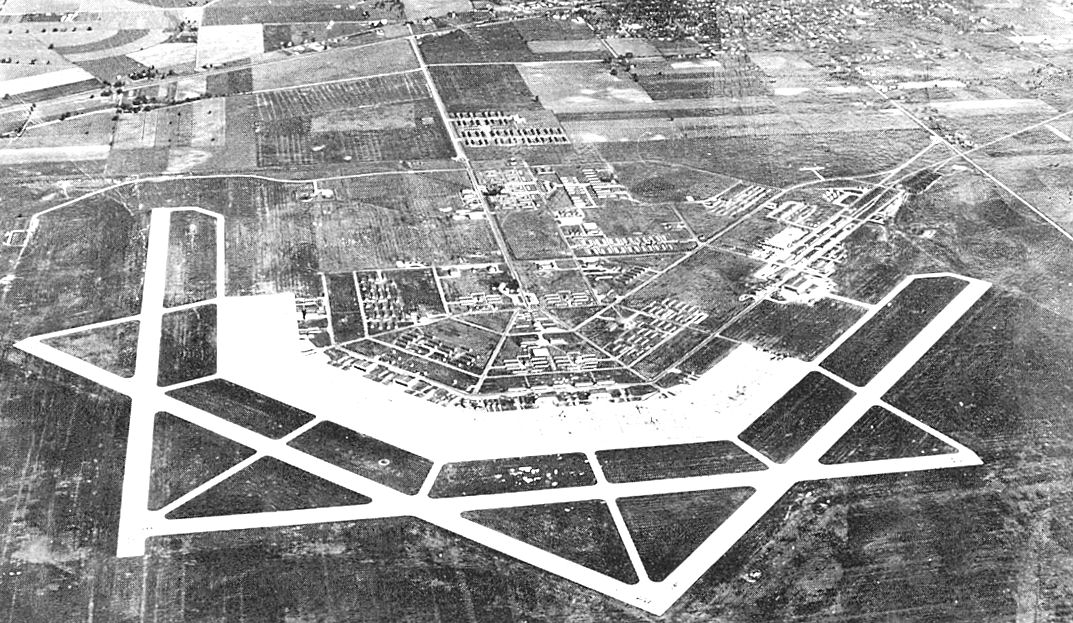
- Freeman Army Airfield, 1946

Site information
- Type: Army Air Force Airfield
- Controlled by: United States Army

Location
- Coordinates: 38°55′29″N 85°54′30″W

Site history
- Built: 1942
- In use: 1942–1946

Location of Freeman Army Airfield, Indiana

For the civil use of this facility after 1946, see Freeman Municipal Airport

Freeman Army Airfield is an inactive United States Army Air Forces base located 2.6 miles (4.2 km) south-southwest of Seymour, Indiana.

Established in 1942, the base became the first military helicopter pilot training airfield. In 1944, black bomber pilots were trained at Freeman. It was the scene of a racial incident that outraged many Americans which led to the military re-evaluating its racial policies. After the war, captured German, Italian and Japanese aircraft were brought to the base for evaluation and testing. It was closed in 1946.

== History ==
Freeman Army Airfield was named in honor of Captain Richard S. Freeman, a native of Indiana and a 1930 graduate of West Point. He was awarded the Distinguished Flying Cross, the Mackay Trophy, and was also one of the pioneers of the Army Air Mail Service. Freeman was killed on 6 February 1941 in the crash of a B-17 Flying Fortress (B-17B 38-216) near Lovelock, Nevada while en route to Wright Field, Ohio. The aircraft was equipped with the top secret Norden bombsight and sabotage was suspected as the cause of the crash, but was never proven.

=== World War II ===
Initial surveys of the area were made in April 1942 and the present site of Freeman Municipal Airport was selected for construction. The selected site was announced on 3 April 1942. Army Air Forces officials met with local landowners to obtain rights to a single tract of 2,500 acres for the main airfield and support base, along with five additional tracts for auxiliary landing fields near Walesboro 39°08′34″N 05°55′25″W, Grammer, St. Thomas 39°02′40″N 85°36′23″W, Kentucky, Zenas and Valonia 38°46′37″N 86°06′52″W, Indiana. Of the five auxiliaries, Walesboro and St. Anne were to have concrete runways. Only three of these can be located today.

The first construction for the new airfield began in late June 1942 with construction proceeding throughout the summer. It included more than one hundred buildings, all intended to be temporary. Station buildings and streets were also constructed, the buildings consisting primarily of wood, tar paper, and non-masonry siding. The use of concrete and steel was limited because of the critical need elsewhere. Most buildings were hot and dusty in the summer and very cold in the winter. Water, sewer and electrical services were also constructed. The airfield consisted of runways in a "star" layout consisting of four 5,500 x 150' runways laid out in a north–south, northeast–southwest, east–west and a northwest–southeast direction. An extra-large parking ramp was constructed to accommodate large numbers of training aircraft, several hangars, a control tower and other auxiliary support aircraft buildings.

War Department General Order Number 10, dated 3 March 1943, announced that the airfield was to be named Freeman Army Airfield in honor of the Indiana native killed in a 1941 B-17 crash. Captain Freeman helped establish Ladd Field which is today's Fort Wainwright just outside Fairbanks, Alaska. He was Ladd Field's first commander.

==== Army Air Forces Training Command ====
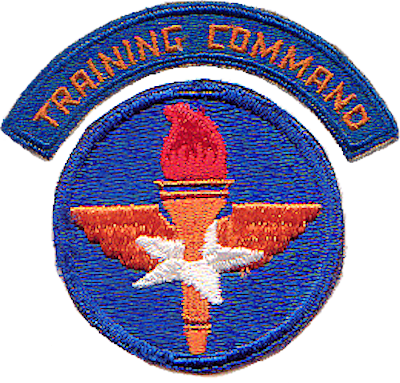

The airfield was placed under the jurisdiction of the 33d Twin Engine Flying Training Group, Army Air Forces Training Command. The 447th Base Headquarters and Air Base Squadron was activated on 2 October 1942, and the airfield was activated on 1 December 1942, with the first troops began arriving on 8 December 1942.

The field's twin-engine training era was commanded by Colonel Elmer T. Rundquist, a former University of Illinois football player who had served as the base's project officer before taking command.

The mission of Freeman AAF was a twin-engine advanced aircraft training school. Most of the initial staffing cadre of the faculty was drawn from Craig Army Airfield, near Selma, Alabama. Five training squadrons, the 466th, 467th, 1078th, 1079th 1080th Twin-Engine Pilot were established at Freeman Field, and a total of 250 Beechcraft AT-10 Wichita trainers had arrived by the end of February 1943. The first flying cadets, who had just graduated from AAFTC advanced single-engine schools arrived on 2 March were formed as class 43-D. Night training commenced on 5 April. The first class was graduated on 29 April and the graduated went on to fly multi-engine aircraft such as the B-24 Liberator, B-17 Flying Fortress, B-29 Superfortress, and various other medium bombers and transport aircraft. Twin-engine training continued with a total of 19 classes of students being graduated from Freeman Field. The last graduates were in May 1944 (Class 44-K); 4,245 total cadets.

Twin-engine training ended in May 1944 and AAFTC initiated helicopter training at Freeman Field in June 1944. Freeman was the first helicopter base in the AAF, The first instructor pilots arrived on 30 June and preparations for the helicopter training were made in great secrecy, as in 1944 very few people had seen a helicopter and the technology was new and revolutionary. The group assigned to coordinate their arrival was known as "Section B-O". A total of six Sikorsky R-4A helicopters were assigned for training, flown directly to Freeman from the Sikorsky plant at Bridgeport, Connecticut. This was the longest long-distance flight of helicopters at the time.

The first helicopter class began training in July, graduating on 13 August. The training program continued throughout the balance of 1944, the last class (44-K) graduating on 1 February 1945. In January 1945, AAFTC moved the training to Chanute Field, Illinois, so it could consolidate the flying training operation with helicopter mechanic training.

With the end of helicopter training, Freeman Field's training mission was closed down and the facility was to be transferred as excess to Air Technical Service Command effective 1 March 1945.

==== First Air Force ====
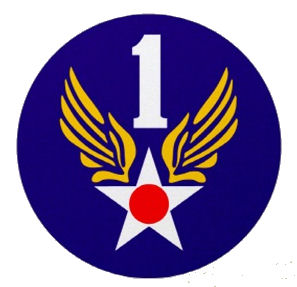

On 1 February 1945 plans were changed by HQ Army Air Forces and Freeman Field was not to be inactivated. Jurisdiction of the facility was transferred to First Air Force as an Operational Training airfield. Throughout World War II, continued pressure from African-American civilian leaders led the Army to allow blacks to train as members of bomber crews, a step that opened many more skilled combat roles to them. In response to this pressure, the mission of the base was changed to training black airmen for B-25 Mitchell medium bomber crews.

On 15 January 1944, the 477th Bombardment (later Composite) Group was activated to train African-American aviators on B-25s at Selfridge Field near Detroit, Michigan. On 5 May possibly out of fear of a repeat of the summer 1943 race riot in nearby Detroit, the 477th was abruptly relocated to Godman Field at Fort Knox, Kentucky.

Facilities and runways at Godman AAF were not suitable for B-25 training and to accommodate the full compliment of the four squadrons of the 477th, thus two of the squadrons, the 618th and 619th Bombardment Squadron were moved to Atterbury Army Airfield, Indiana, in August 1944 for training. In March 1945 the 477th reached its full combat strength and the two squadrons in training at Atterbury were moved to Freeman Field to consolidate with the 616th and 617th Bombardment Squadrons that had previously been moved to Freeman from Godman. The entire group was assembled for final group training at Freeman and it was scheduled to deploy overseas in into combat on 1 July.

The 477th ground echelon began moving by train to Freeman Field on 1 March 1945. The unit consisted of about 1,300 black airmen. The B-25 squadrons arrived at the field during the first week of March. Freeman had two officer clubs: Officer Club 1 for trainees, and Officer Club 2 for instructors. Despite Army regulations against segregation, the two officer clubs were, in practice, segregated between white officers in command and the black aviators in training, which caused much racial tension in the unit. A so-called "mutiny" at Freeman took place on 5 April 1945 when three black aviator officers attempted to enter Officer Club 2. They were placed under arrest and ordered confined to quarters. The next night, an additional 58 additional black aviator officers attempted to enter the club, which led to physical violence and over sixty personnel were arrested. In response, an investigation was made and the unit commander drafted a new regulation, Base Regulation 85-2, which confirmed segregation of club facilities, which the black aviator officers were asked to sign and acknowledge. One hundred one black officers refused to sign the regulation and were placed under arrest in quarters.

All of the arrested were transferred to Godman Field where they were held awaiting court-martial. Training of the unit at Freeman was immediately halted. Later in April, under public pressure charges were dropped against all except the original three. Of these, one was tried and fined $150 for violence against an MP.

As a result of the protest, the 477th was reassigned back to Godman Field by the end of April 1945, and two of its four bomb squadrons (the 616th and 619th) inactivated. The protests by black officers at Freeman Field against the segregated facilities made headlines throughout the nation, and helped focus a re-thinking of the racial segregation policies of the military.

With the 477th moved to Kentucky, on 2 May 1945, Freeman Field was placed on Standby Status, with jurisdiction of the facility being transferred to Air Technical Service Command on 15 May.

==== Foreign Aircraft Evaluation Center ====
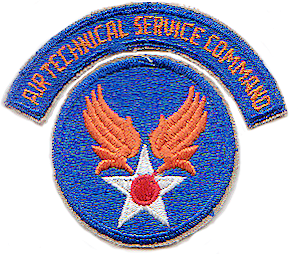

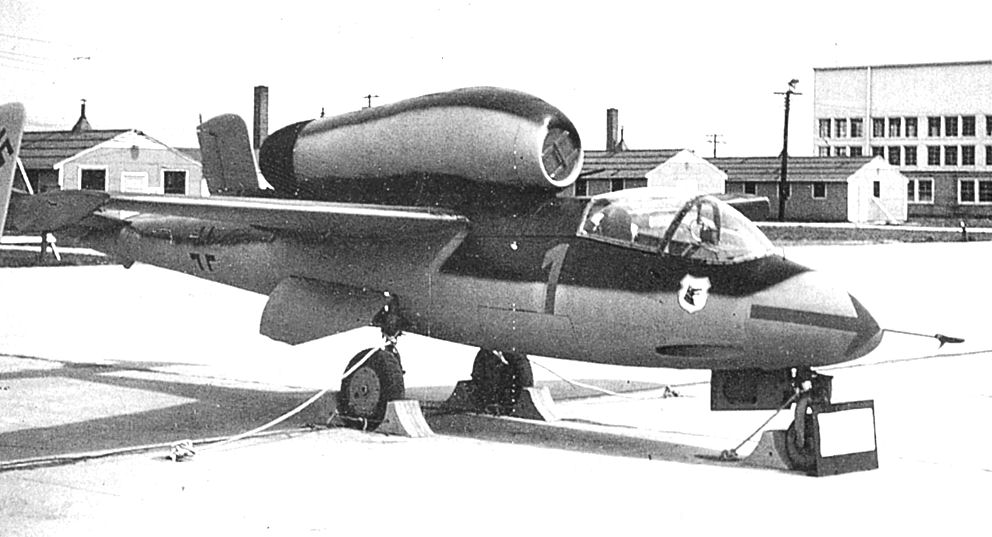
Heinkel He 162 at Freeman Field, 1945

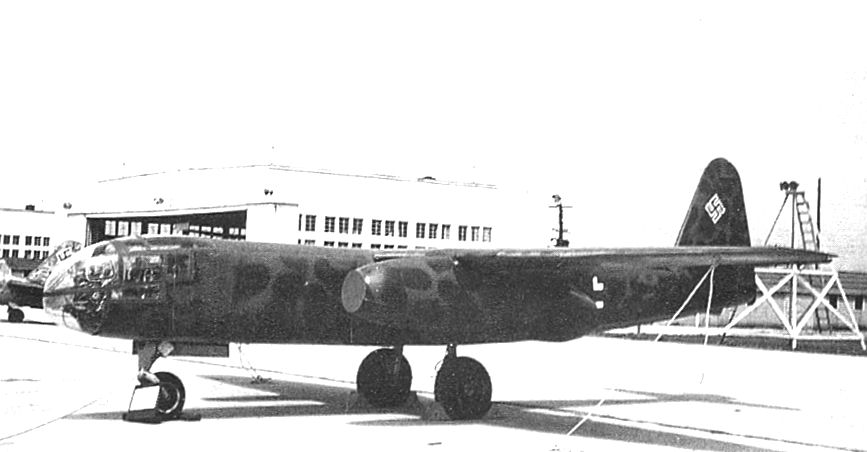
Captured German Arado Ar 234 jet bomber

On 11 June, Freeman was re-activated by ATSC as the Foreign Aircraft Evaluation Center for the Air Force. After the end of the war in Europe, captured German and Italian aircraft were collected by "Operation Lusty". These aircraft were shipped to the United States for evaluation. Freeman had plentiful empty space which could be used to store these aircraft and perform evaluation flights.

In 1945 the enemy aircraft shipped to the United States were divided between the Navy and the Army Air Forces. General Hap Arnold ordered the preservation of one of every type of aircraft used by the enemy forces.

Initially, the Air Force brought their aircraft to Wright Field, and when the field could no longer handle additional aircraft, many were sent to Freeman Field to the foreign technology evaluation center established there. Most of the foreign airplanes were German, but there were also Japanese, Italian and English planes. Nowhere in the United States would there be such large numbers of foreign aircraft, many of which were rare and incredible advanced for their time, In addition, there were warehouses full of Luftwaffe equipment. Forty-seven personnel were engaged in the identification, inspection and warehousing of captured foreign equipment. Freeman Field was also charged with the mission to receive and catalogue United States equipment for display at the present and for the future AAF museum.

The evaluation center was the last United States Air Force operation at Freeman Field. By the middle of 1946, the program was winding down and efforts began to dispose of the surplus captured equipment. The larger aircraft were sent to Davis-Monthan Field, Arizona, and the fighter aircraft sent to the Special Depot, Park Ridge, Ill. (now O'Hare Airport), which was under the control of ATSC's Office of Intelligence.

Not all of the captured planes assigned to Freeman were transferred. Some which were left at the field were destroyed or buried. Examples of aircraft that have no record of leaving Freeman Field are a Dornier Do 335 experimental interceptor; a Heinkel He 219 radar-equipped night fighter; an Arado Ar 234 twin-engined jet bomber, two Messerschmitt Me 163 rocket-powered interceptors, two Focke-Wulf Fw 190 interceptors and a Junkers Ju 88 two-engine multi-role aircraft.

In addition to the captured aircraft, there was the task of disposing all of the equipment and other surplus material at the field, including the physical buildings. Sales were held throughout 1946 for scrap lumber of torn down buildings, fence posts, barbed wire and other items which no longer had a useful need. The last airmen left Freeman Army Airfield on 27 November 1946.

==== Closure ====
Freeman Field was closed and declared surplus on 30 December 1946 and was turned over to the War Assets Administration (WAA) for disposal. Throughout 1947, buildings and equipment were sold. Freeman Field was deeded as a municipal airport to Seymour, Indiana. In July 1947, a flight training school for former servicemen was set up and over 70 students took pilot training at the field.

The WAA determined the post-war use of the land and structures: 2,241 acres (9.07 km^{2}) for a municipal airport for Seymour; more than 240 acres (0.97 km^{2}) for agricultural training in the Seymour Community Schools; and the Seymour Industrial Association received more than 60 acres (240,000 m^{2}) to develop an industrial park. It was formally sold in November 1948.

Today much of the former Freeman Army Airfield is leased to farmers who grow corn and soy beans on it. The runways are still there although two are shut down. Most of the station area is an industrial park. There are about a dozen buildings that remain from the former Army Airfield. The Indiana National Guard's Company C, 38th Support Battalion (Main) also has an armory on the former base. Also, Freeman Army Air Field Museum is located near the airport office. The museum contains a large collection of memorabilia that has been collected and donated by flyers who were stationed there and other interested persons.

Several groups are engaged in locating and recovering any aviation artifacts from the aircraft which were destroyed and buried in 1946. The groups are currently in communication with former base personnel, local eyewitnesses, and historians in order to get a comprehensive picture of where the burial pits are located and what items were put in them.

== See also ==
- Indiana World War II Army Airfields
- 30th Flying Training Wing (World War II)
