= Godman Army Airfield =

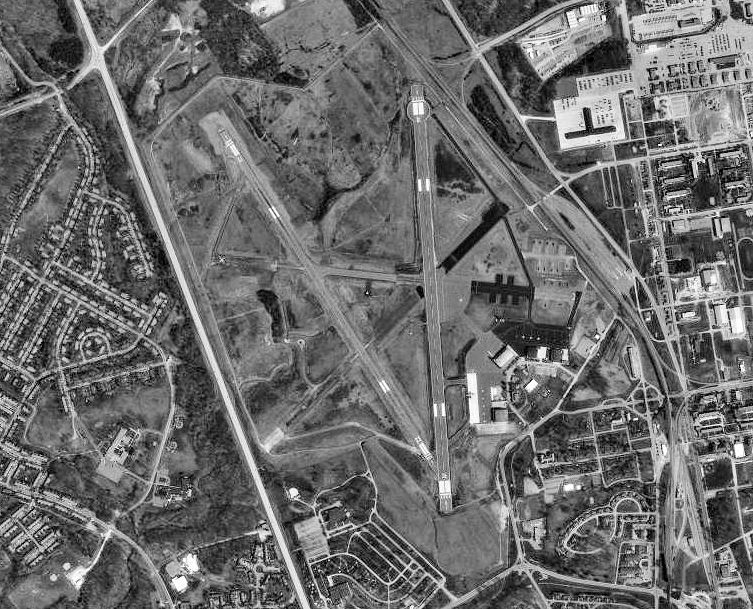
- USGS aerial image, 29 March 1998
- IATA: FTK; ICAO: KFTK; FAA LID: FTK

Summary
- Airport type: Military
- Owner: United States Army
- Location: Fort Knox, Kentucky
- Elevation AMSL: 756 ft (230 m)
- Coordinates: 37°54′25″N 085°58′20″W

Map
- Location within Kentucky

Runways
Direction	Length		Surface
Direction	ft	m	Surface
5/23	1,900	579	Asphalt
9/27	4,999	1,524	PEM
15/33	5,253	1,601	Asphalt
18/36	5,585	1,702	Asphalt
- Source: Federal Aviation Administration

Godman Army Airfield (IATA: FTK, ICAO: KFTK, FAA LID: FTK) is a military airport located on the Fort Knox United States Army post in Hardin County, Kentucky, United States. It has four runways and is used entirely by the United States Army Aviation Branch.

== UFOs: Mantell Incident ==
The Thomas Mantell incident began at 1:20pm on 7 January 1948, when the control tower operators at Godman Army Airfield, Kentucky sighted an unidentified airborne object in the sky close to the base. Several senior officers were summoned, and the base Operations and Intelligence Officer were soon joined by the Commanding Officer, but none were able to identify the object.

At the time a flight of four P-51 fighters was on a routine training flight under the supervision of Flight Commander Captain Thomas Mantell. They were flying towards Godman Field when, at approximately 2:45pm, the control tower officer in charge ordered them to investigate the strange object. Captain Mantell acknowledged, but a short time later one of the pilots requested permission to break away as he was running low on fuel, leaving the three remaining aircraft to head in the direction of the strange object.

The next message came from one of the three remaining pilots, who said he was losing his bearings and was becoming fearful of becoming lost. He too was granted permission to break away and return, but he would be accompanied by one of the two remaining pilots, who was instructed to accompany his colleague to guide him safely back to base. The only aircraft now in pursuit of the object was that piloted by Captain Thomas Mantell.

At 15,000 feet Mantell contacted the control tower and stated that he had the object in sight and was climbing to investigate. A short time later Mantell reported that he was closing on the object but that was the last message broadcast. Mantell's aircraft crashed approximately 90 miles south of Godman Field.

The official Air Technical Information Command report on the crash stated that they were of the opinion that Captain Mantell lost consciousness due to oxygen starvation. The trimmed aircraft had continued to climb until increasing altitude caused a sufficient loss of power for it to level out. The aircraft then began to turn left due to torque and as the wing drooped, so did the nose, until it was in a tight turning spiral. The uncontrolled descent resulted in excessive speed causing the aircraft to disintegrate. It is believed that Captain Mantell never regained consciousness. This was borne out by the fact that the canopy lock was still in place after the crash, discounting any attempt to abandon the aircraft. They also stated that the UFO was in no way responsible for the crash.

== See also ==
- Kentucky World War II Army Airfields
