= Daniel James Jr. =

United States Air Force general

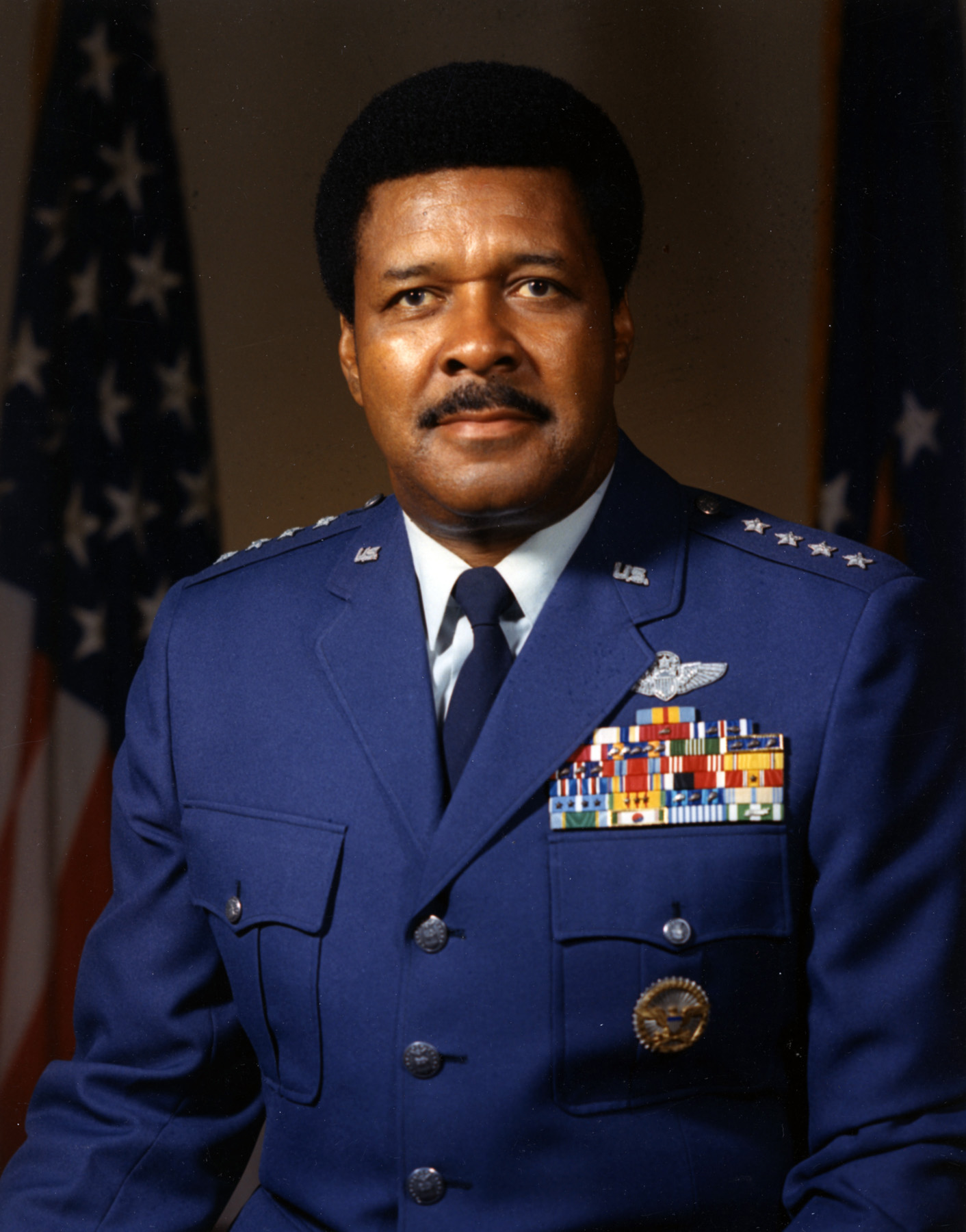
- Born: February 11, 1920; Pensacola, Florida, U.S.
- Died: February 25, 1978 (aged 58); Colorado Springs, Colorado, U.S.
- Burial place: Arlington National Cemetery
- Relatives: Lieutenant General Daniel James III (son)
- Military career
- Allegiance: United States
- Branch: United States Army Air Forces (1943–1947); United States Air Force (1947–1978)
- Service years: 1943–1978
- Rank: General
- Nickname: "Chappie"
- Commands: North American Aerospace Defense Command; Military Airlift Command; 7272nd Flying Training Wing; 33rd Tactical Fighter Wing; 8th Tactical Fighter Wing; 92d Tactical Fighter Squadron; 437th Fighter-Interceptor Squadron
- Conflicts: World War II; Korean War; Vietnam War; Operation Bolo
- Awards: Defense Distinguished Service Medal; Air Force Distinguished Service Medal (2); Legion of Merit (2); Distinguished Flying Cross (3); Meritorious Service Medal; Air Medal (14)

Daniel "Chappie" James Jr. (February 11, 1920 – February 25, 1978) was a fighter pilot in the United States Air Force who, in 1975, became the first African American to reach the rank of four-star general in the United States Armed Forces. Three years later, James was forced to retire prematurely due to heart issues, just weeks later dying of a heart attack.

James attended the famous Tuskegee Institute and instructed African American pilots during World War II. He flew combat missions during the Korean War and Vietnam War, and received the Defense Distinguished Service Medal, two Air Force Distinguished Service Medals, two Legions of Merit, three Distinguished Flying Crosses, a Meritorious Service Medal, and fourteen Air Medals.

== Biography ==
=== Early life and education ===
Daniel James Jr. was born on February 11, 1920, to Lillie Anna (Brown) and Daniel James. His mother, Lillie Anna James, was a high school teacher who established a private school for her own and other Black children in Pensacola, Florida. Daniel James Sr. worked for the Pensacola city gas company. His mother would continue to run the "Lillie A James School" until her death at the age of 82. James is a graduate of the Tuskegee Institute, a precursor to Tuskegee University, in 1942, receiving a Bachelor of Science degree in physical education.

=== Military career ===
==== World War II ====
James continued civilian pilot training under the government-sponsored Civilian Pilot Training Program. He then enlisted in the Aviation Cadet Program of the United States Army Air Forces on January 18, 1943, receiving his commission as a second lieutenant and pilot wings at Tuskegee Army Airfield, Alabama, on July 28, 1943. He remained at Tuskegee as a civilian instructor pilot in the Army Air Corps later that July. Throughout the remainder of the war, James trained pilots for the all-Black 99th Pursuit Squadron.

After completing P-40 Warhawk training and then B-25 Mitchell training, James served as a B-25 pilot with the 617th Bomb Squadron of the 477th Bomb Group at Godman Army Airfield and then at Lockbourne Army Airfield from January 1944 until the end of the war.

While arrested for participating in the Freeman Field mutiny, James smuggled out press releases written by Coleman Young. James did not see combat himself until the Korean War.

While serving in Lockbourne, James next served as a P-47 Thunderbolt pilot with the 301st Fighter Squadron from July 1947 to October 1948, and then served on the staff of the 332nd Air Base Group at Lockbourne from November 1948 to September 1949.

==== Korean War ====
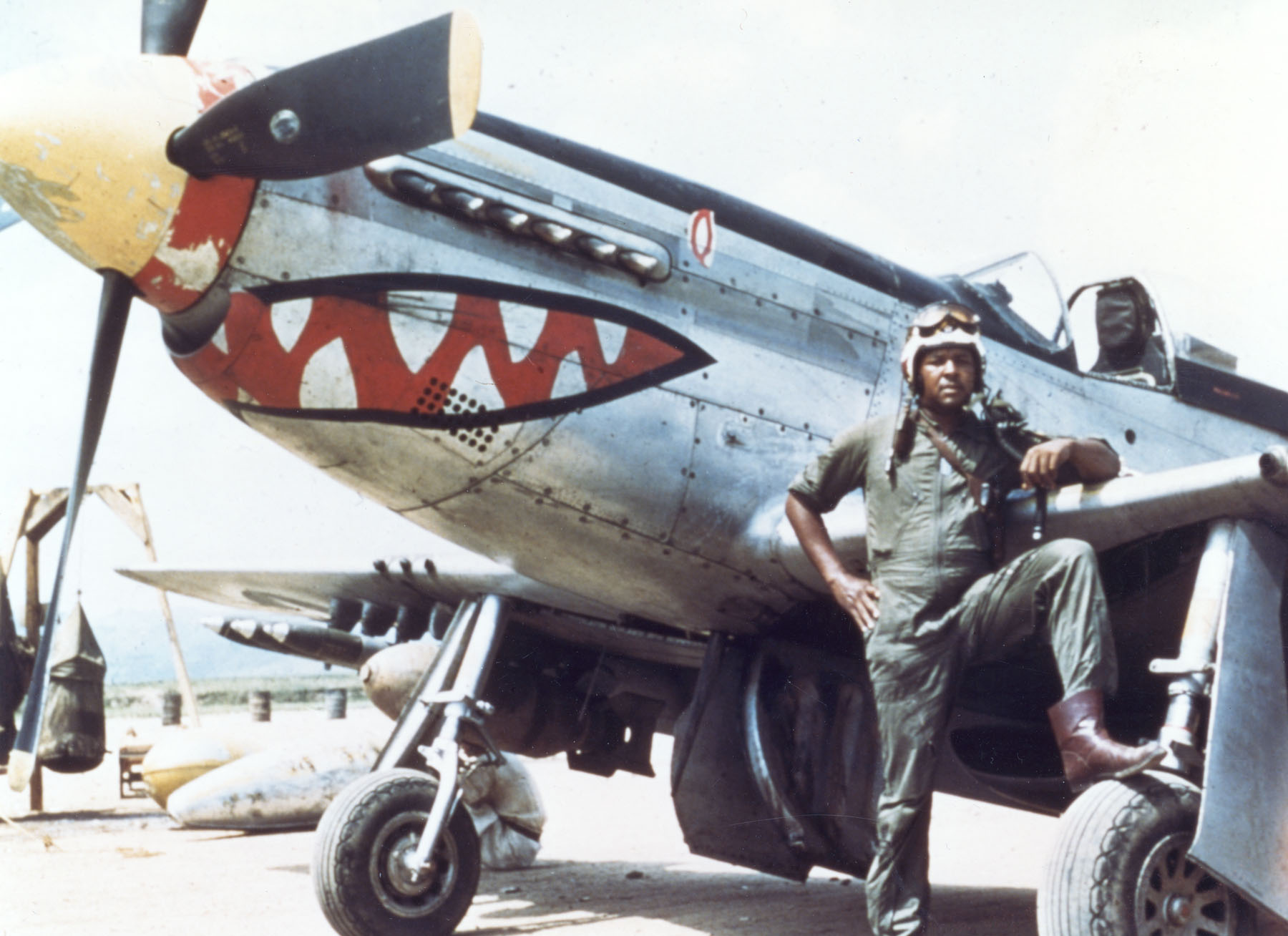
James with F-51 in South Korea

In September 1949, James went to the Philippines as flight leader for the 12th Fighter-Bomber Squadron, 18th Fighter Wing at Clark Field. In July 1950 he left for Korea, where he flew 101 combat missions in F-51 Mustang and F-80 Shooting Star aircraft. His combat missions were with the 67th Fighter Bomber Squadron, 12th Fighter Bomber Squadron, and 44th Fighter Bomber Squadron.

==== After Korea ====
James returned to the United States, and in July 1951 went to Otis Air Force Base, Massachusetts, as an all-weather jet fighter pilot with the 58th Fighter-Interceptor Squadron, later becoming operations officer. In April 1953, he became commander of the 437th Fighter-Interceptor Squadron, and assumed command of the 60th Fighter-Interceptor Squadron in August 1955. While stationed at Otis, he received the Massachusetts Junior Chamber of Commerce 1954 award of "Young Man of the Year" for his outstanding community relations efforts. On August 15, 1954, he appeared as a contestant on the game show What's My Line? He graduated from the Air Command and Staff College in June 1957.

James next was assigned to Headquarters U.S. Air Force as a staff officer in the Air Defense Division of the Office of the Deputy Chief of Staff for Operations. In July 1960 he was transferred to RAF Bentwaters in England, where he served successively as assistant director of operations and then director of operations, 81st Tactical Fighter Wing; commander, 92nd Tactical Fighter Squadron; and deputy commander for operations for the 81st Wing. In September 1964, James was transferred to Davis-Monthan Air Force Base, Arizona, where he was director of operations training and later deputy commander for operations for the 4453rd Combat Crew Training Wing.

==== Vietnam War ====
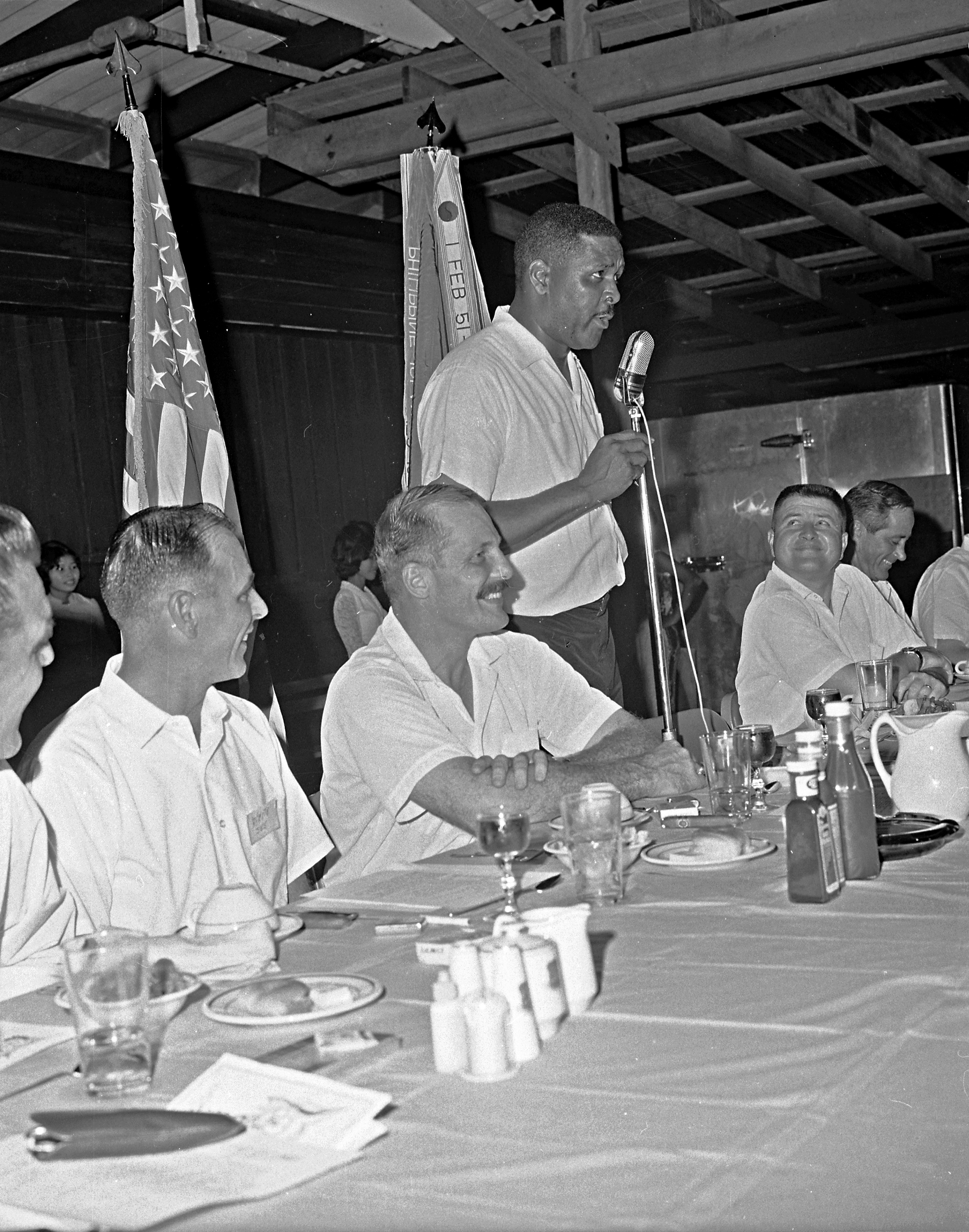
Daniel "Chappie" James Jr. (standing) in August 1967, addressing a conference at Ubon Air Base, Thailand. Robin Olds is sitting to his right.

James went to Ubon Royal Thai Air Force Base, Thailand, in December 1966, as deputy commander for operations, 8th TFW. In June 1967, under Colonel Robin Olds, he was named wing vice commander when Col. Vermont Garrison completed his tour. Both in their mid-40s, they formed a legendary team nicknamed "Blackman and Robin". James flew 78 combat missions into North Vietnam, many in the Hanoi/Haiphong area, and led a flight of F-4 Phantom II fighters in the "Operation Bolo" MiG sweep in which seven Communist MiG-21s were destroyed, the highest total kill of any mission during the Vietnam War.

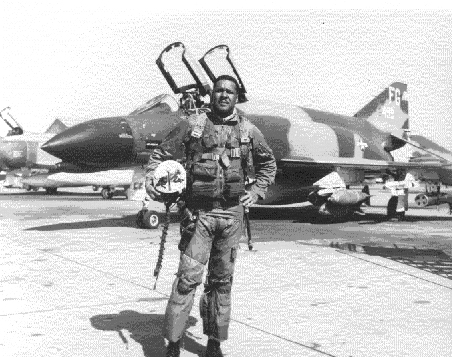
Colonel (at the time) Daniel "Chappie" James Jr. in front of his McDonnell-Douglas F-4C Phantom in Thailand during the Vietnam War

==== After Vietnam ====
He was named vice commander of the 33rd TFW at Eglin Air Force Base, Florida, in December 1967. While stationed at Eglin, the Florida State Jaycees named James as Florida's "Outstanding American of the Year" for 1969, and he received the Jaycee Distinguished Service Award. He was transferred to Wheelus Air Base in the Libyan Arab Republic in August 1969 as Commander of the 7272nd Fighter Training Wing.

Following the coup engineered by radical Libyan officers, including Mohammar Qaddafi, James had a tense standoff with the militants in the late stages of turning Wheelus over to the Libyans. James was determined not to be pushed off the base early, but Qaddafi and his followers began pushing the Americans to see how far they could go and at one point "ran a column of half-tracks through the base housing area at full speed". Following this escalation, James closed the gates of the base. Qaddafi arrived at the gate and while talking to James, moved his hand over to his pistol holster to which James replied: "I told him to move his hand away. If he had pulled that gun, his hand would have never cleared the holster."

In March 1970 James was promoted to brigadier general and became Deputy Assistant Secretary of Defense (Public Affairs). James played a key role in rejecting the accuracy of a list of prisoners of war supplied by North Vietnam, despite widespread agreement within the U.S. government that it was in close accord with intelligence estimates. That rejection, in turn, bolstered the politically explosive myth that the communists deliberately were holding prisoners as hostages for some future leverage.

He was designated principal Deputy Assistant Secretary of Defense (Public Affairs) in April 1973. On September 1, 1974, he assumed duty as vice commander of the Military Airlift Command (MAC), headquartered at Scott Air Force Base, Illinois, as a Lieutenant General.

On September 1, 1975, James was promoted to the four-star rank of general (O-10), becoming the highest ranking African-American in the history of the United States military to that date. He was assigned as commander in chief of NORAD/ADCOM at Peterson Air Force Base, Colorado. In these dual capacities, he had operational command of all United States and Canadian strategic aerospace defense forces. On December 6, 1977, he assumed duty as special assistant to the Chief of Staff, U.S. Air Force.

James retired from the Air Force on February 1, 1978.

=== Death ===
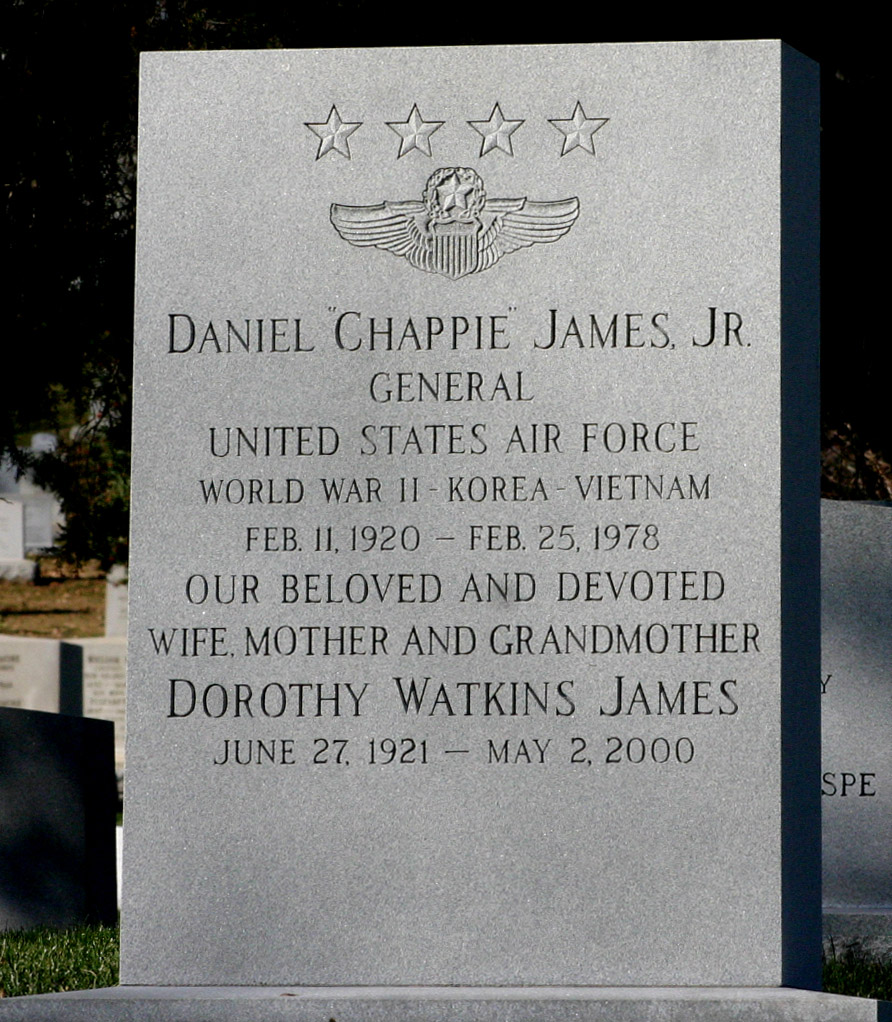
Arlington National Cemetery

James died of a heart attack on February 25, 1978, just two weeks after his 58th birthday and three weeks following his retirement from the Air Force. An earlier heart attack had forced his retirement.

He was buried with full military honors at Arlington National Cemetery, following a Funeral Mass at the Basilica of the National Shrine of the Immaculate Conception in Washington DC.

He was survived by his wife, Dorothy Watkins James, their daughter, Danice Berry, and two sons, Daniel James III and Claude James. His wife Dorothy died in 2000 and is buried with him in Arlington.

== Personal life ==
James met his wife Dorothy while he was at Tuskegee, and they were married on the campus on November 3, 1942. They had two sons and one daughter. General James's son, Lieutenant General Daniel James III, also served in the United States Air Force as a fighter pilot and in the Texas Air National Guard. He served from 1995 to 2002 as the Adjutant General of the Texas National Guard (the first Black general to hold the post), and as Director of the Air National Guard from 2002 to 2006. In the summer of 2006, he retired from the Air Force at the rank of Lieutenant General after 38 years of total commissioned service, on active duty and as an Air Guardsman.

James appeared as a guest on the August 15, 1954 episode of the panel game show What's My Line?.

== Political positions ==
James was widely known for his speeches on Americanism and patriotism, for which he was editorialized in numerous national and international publications.

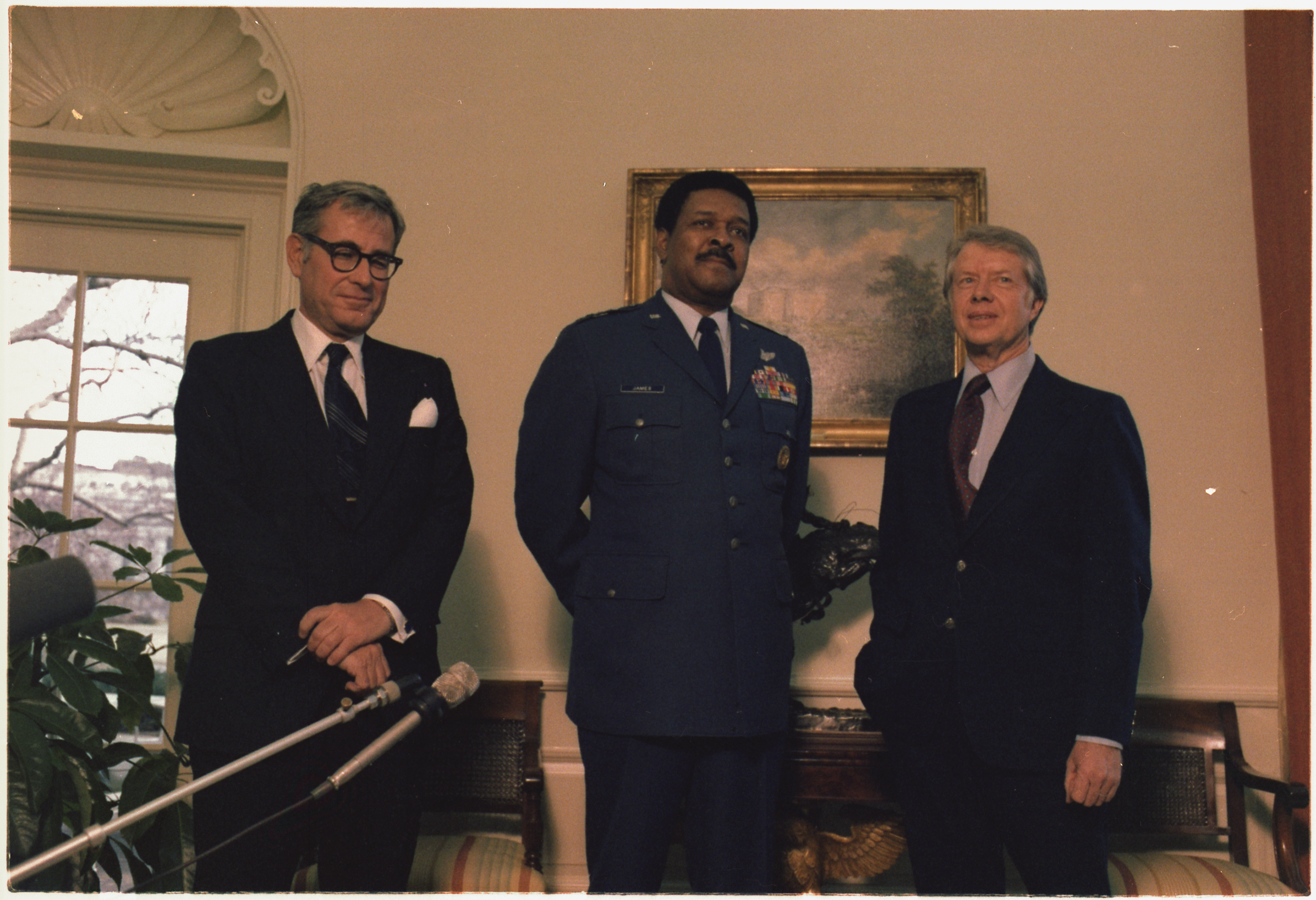
Secretary of Defense Harold Brown (left) and General James (center) visit Jimmy Carter

Excerpts critical of the growing civil rights movement were read into the Congressional Record.

The statements by James in which he repudiated the most militant point of view endeared him to concerned whites, including President Johnson, who invited him to a White House reception. Immediately after the murder of Dr. Martin Luther King Jr., and as riots erupted in several areas across the country, James addressed a gathering of Air Force Association officers at which he declared that in spite of events and the resistance to progress, "I'm not disgusted-I'm a citizen of the United States of America and I'm no second-class citizen either and no man here is, unless he thinks like one and reasons like one and performs like one. This is my country and I believe in her, and I will serve her, and I'll contribute to her welfare whenever and however I can. If she has any ills, I'll stand by her until in God's given time, through her wisdom and her consideration for the welfare of the entire nation, she will put them right."

He was awarded the George Washington Freedom Foundation Medal in both 1967 and 1968. He received the Arnold Air Society Eugene M. Zuckert Award in 1970 for outstanding contributions to Air Force professionalism. His citation read "... fighter pilot with a magnificent record, public speaker, and eloquent spokesman for the American Dream we so rarely achieve."

== Honors and awards ==
General James' military awards include the following:

U.S. Air Force Command Pilot Badge
Defense Distinguished Service Medal	Air Force Distinguished Service Medal with bronze oak leaf cluster	Legion of Merit with bronze oak leaf cluster
Distinguished Flying Cross with two bronze oak leaf clusters	Meritorious Service Medal	Air Medal with two silver and two bronze oak leaf clusters
Air Medal (second ribbon required for accoutrement spacing)	Army Commendation Medal	Air Force Presidential Unit Citation with silver oak leaf cluster
Air Force Outstanding Unit Award with three bronze oak leaf clusters	Army Good Conduct Medal	Combat Readiness Medal
American Defense Service Medal	American Campaign Medal	World War II Victory Medal
Army of Occupation Medal with 'Japan' clasp	National Defense Service Medal with bronze service star	Korean Service Medal with four bronze campaign stars
Vietnam Service Medal with three bronze campaign stars	Air Force Longevity Service Award with one silver and two bronze oak leaf clusters	Armed Forces Reserve Medal
Small Arms Expert Marksmanship Ribbon	Republic of Korea Presidential Unit Citation	Republic of Vietnam Gallantry Cross
United Nations Service Medal for Korea	Vietnam Campaign Medal	Korean War Service Medal

Office of the Secretary of Defense Identification Badge

The civilian awards that General James received included the following:

Builders of a Greater Arizona Award (1969); Phoenix Urban League Man of the Year Award, Distinguished Service Achievement Award from Kappa Alpha Psi fraternity (1970); American Legion National Commander's Public Relations Award, Veteran of Foreign Wars Commander in Chief's Gold Medal Award and Citation (1971); Capital Press Club, Washington, D.C., Salute to Black Pioneers Award (1975); and, all in 1976, the Air Force Association Jimmy Doolittle Chapter Man of the Year Award, Florida Association of Broadcasters' Gold Medal Award, American Veterans of World War II Silver Helmet Award, United Service Organization Liberty Bell Award, Blackbook Minority Business and Reference Guidance Par Excellence Award, American Academy of Achievement Golden Plate Award, United Negro College Fund's Distinguished Service Award, Horatio Alger Award, VFW Americanism Medal, Bishop Wright Air Industry Award, and the Kitty Hawk Award (Military).

He was awarded honorary doctor of laws degrees from the University of West Florida in 1971; the University of Akron in 1973; Virginia State College in 1974; Delaware State College in 1975; and St. Louis University in 1976. He was named honorary national commander of the Arnold Air Society in 1971.

In 1993, James Jr. was inducted into the National Aviation Hall of Fame in Dayton, Ohio.

In 2019, he was chosen as the Class Exemplar for the U.S. Air Force Academy Class of 2022.

In 2020, the Pensacola Bay Bridge was renamed the General Daniel "Chappie" James Jr. Bridge, with Florida Governor Ron DeSantis signing the bill designating the bridge's name on June 2, 2020. Representative Alex Andrade and Senator Doug Broxson sponsored the successful initiatives in the Florida Legislature. The bridge connects larger Pensacola with Gulf Breeze and the beachfront community of Pensacola Beach.

== Effective dates of promotion ==
Insignia	Rank	Date
	General	September 1, 1975
	Lieutenant general	June 1, 1973
	Major general	August 1, 1972
	Brigadier general	July 1, 1970
	Colonel	November 15, 1964
	Lieutenant colonel	April 25, 1956
	Major	June 18, 1952
	Captain	October 31, 1950
	First lieutenant	July 1, 1944
	Second lieutenant	July 28, 1943

== See also ==
- Benjamin O. Davis Jr.
- Benjamin O. Davis Sr.
- Martin Delany
