= Robin Olds =

United States Air Force general

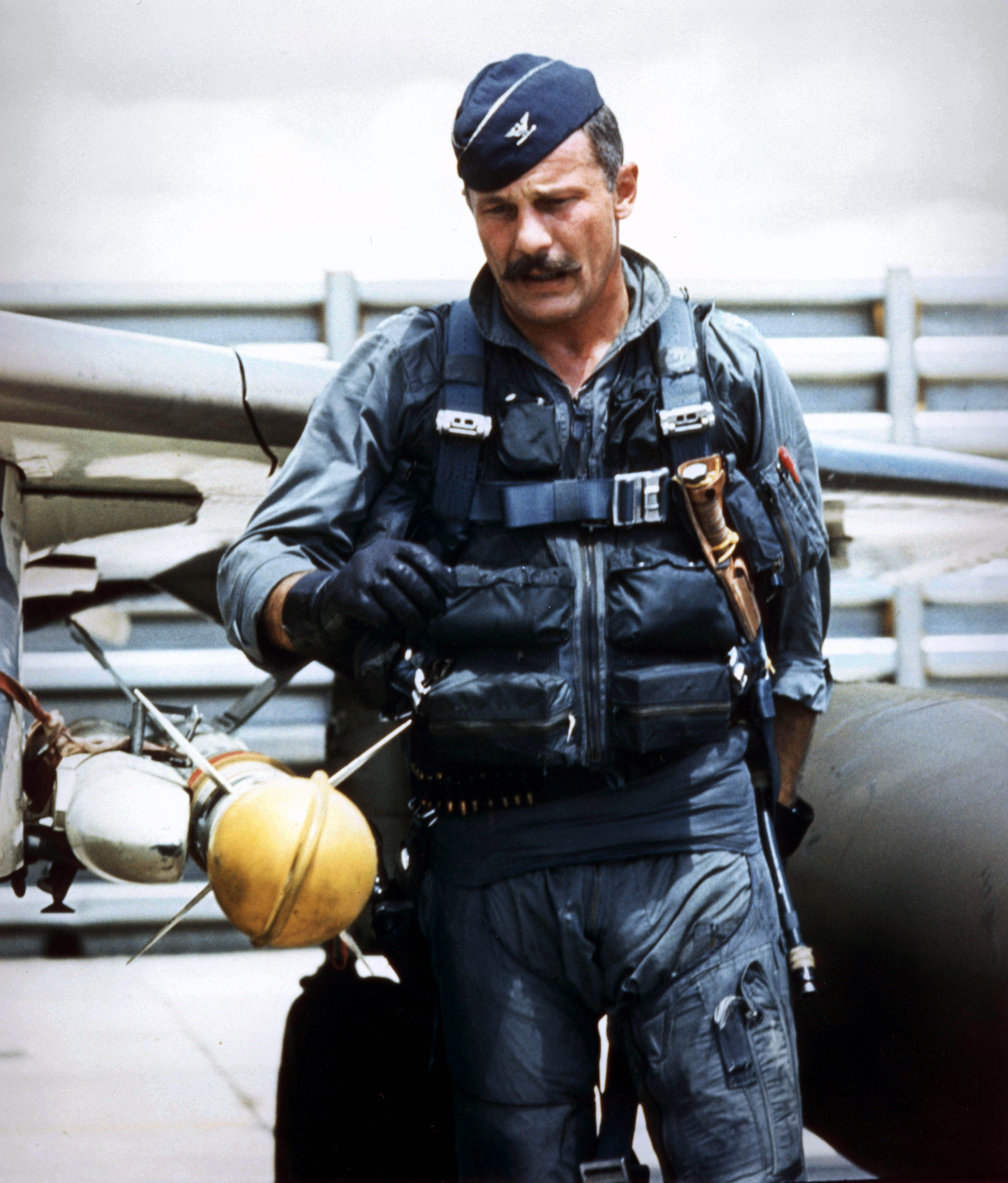
- Olds at Ubon RTAFB, Thailand, c. September 1967
- Born: Robert Oldys Jr. July 14, 1922; Honolulu, Territory of Hawaii, U.S.
- Died: June 14, 2007 (aged 84); Steamboat Springs, Colorado, U.S.
- Burial place: United States Air Force Academy Cemetery
- Spouses: Ella Raines (m. 1947; div. 1976) Abigail Morgan Sellers Barnett (m. 1978; div. 1993)
- Children: 3
- Relatives: Robert Olds (father)
- Military career
- Allegiance: United States
- Branch: United States Army Air Forces; United States Air Force
- Service years: 1943–1947 (Army Air Forces); 1947–1973 (Air Force)
- Rank: Brigadier general
- Units: 479th Fighter Group; 8th Tactical Fighter Wing
- Commands: 8th Tactical Fighter Wing; 81st Tactical Fighter Wing; 86th Fighter-Interceptor Group; No. 1 Squadron RAF; 434th Fighter Squadron
- Conflicts: World War II; Vietnam War; Operation Bolo
- Awards: Air Force Cross; Air Force Distinguished Service Medal (2); Silver Star (4); Legion of Merit; Distinguished Flying Cross (6); Air Medal (40); Distinguished Flying Cross (United Kingdom); Croix de guerre (France)

Robin Olds (born Robert Oldys Jr.; July 14, 1922 – June 14, 2007) was an American fighter pilot and general officer in the United States Air Force (USAF). He was a "triple ace", with a combined total of 16 victories in World War II and the Vietnam War. He retired in 1973 as a brigadier general, after 30 years of service.

The son of U.S. Army Air Forces Major General Robert Olds, educated at West Point, and the product of an upbringing in the early years of the U.S. Army Air Corps, Olds epitomized the youthful World War II fighter pilot. He remained in the service as it became the United States Air Force, despite often being at odds with its leadership, and was one of its pioneer jet pilots. Rising to the command of two fighter wings, Olds is regarded among aviation historians, and his peers, as the best wing commander of the Vietnam War, for both his air-fighting skills, and his reputation as a combat leader.

Olds was promoted to brigadier general after returning from Vietnam but did not hold another major command. The remainder of his career was spent in non-operational positions, as Commandant of Cadets at the United States Air Force Academy and as an official in the Air Force Inspector General's Office. His inability to rise higher as a general officer is attributed to both his maverick views and his penchant for drinking.

Olds had a highly publicized career and life, including marriage to Hollywood actress Ella Raines. As a young man he was also recognized for his athletic prowess in both high school and college, being named an All-American as a lineman in college football.

== Early life ==
Olds was born Robert Oldys Jr. in Honolulu, Hawaii, on July 14, 1922, into an air force family and spent much of his boyhood in Hampton, Virginia, where he attended elementary and high school. His father was Captain (later Major General) Robert Oldys (later Olds), an instructor pilot in France during World War I, former aide to Brigadier General Billy Mitchell from 1922 to 1925, and a leading advocate of strategic bombing in the Air Corps. His mother, Eloise Karine Oldys, died when Robin was four and he was raised by his father. He had one younger brother, Stevan Meigs, two younger paternal half-brothers, Sterling Meigs "Dusty" and Frederick A., born from his father's third marriage to Helen Post Sterling and an older maternal half-brother, Carter Nott, born from his mother's first marriage to Frederick Dickson Nott.

Growing up primarily at Langley Field, Virginia, Olds virtually made daily contact with the small group of officers who would lead the U.S. Army Air Forces in World War II (one neighbor was Major Carl Spaatz, destined to become the first Chief of Staff of the USAF), and as a result was imbued with an unusually strong dedication to the air service, and conversely, with a low tolerance for officers who did not exhibit the same. On November 10, 1925, his father appeared as a witness on behalf of Billy Mitchell during Mitchell's court-martial in Washington, D.C. He brought three-year-old Robin with him to court, dressed in an Air Service uniform, and posed with him for newspaper photographers before testifying.

Olds first flew at the age of eight, in an open cockpit biplane operated by his father. At the age of 12, Olds made attending the U.S. Military Academy at West Point an objective to accomplish his goals of becoming an officer and a military aviator, as well as playing football.

His father was made commander of the pioneer Boeing B-17 Flying Fortress equipped 2nd Bombardment Group at Langley Field on March 1, 1937, and promoted to lieutenant colonel on March 7. Olds attended Hampton High School where he was elected president of his class three successive years, and played varsity high school football on a team that won the state championship of Virginia in 1937. Olds was aggressive, even mean, as a player, and received offers to attend Virginia Military Institute and Dartmouth College on scholarships.

Instead of entering college after graduating in 1939, Olds enrolled at Millard Preparatory School for West Point in Washington, D.C., a school established to prepare men for the entrance examinations to the military academies. When Nazi Germany invaded Poland in 1939, Olds attempted to join the Royal Canadian Air Force but was thwarted by his father's refusal to approve his enlistment papers. Olds completed Millard Prep and applied for admission to the United States Military Academy at West Point. After he received a conditional commitment for nomination from Pennsylvania Congressman J. Buell Snyder, Olds moved to Uniontown, Pennsylvania, where he lived in the YMCA and supported himself working odd jobs. He passed the West Point entrance examination and was accepted into the Class of 1944 on June 1, 1940. He entered the academy a month later but after the Japanese attack on Pearl Harbor, Olds was sent to the Spartan School of Aeronautics in Tulsa, Oklahoma, for flight training. This training ended a year later by Christmas 1942. Olds returned to West Point, hoping to graduate early and see action in the war.

=== West Point and football ===
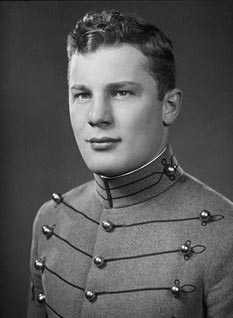
Olds as a cadet in West Point

As a plebe, Olds played football on a freshman squad that began the season with three losses but finished 3–4–1 while the varsity won only one game in its second consecutive losing season. As a result, the new academy superintendent, Maj. Gen. Robert L. Eichelberger, replaced the head coach (an Army officer) with Colonel Earl "Red" Blaik, a 1920 graduate and head coach at Dartmouth, who had recruited Olds in 1939.

Olds played on the varsity college football team in both 1941 and 1942. At 6 feet 2 inches in height (1.88m) and weighing 205 pounds (92 kg), he played tackle on both offense and defense, lettering both seasons. Army's record in 1941 was 5–3–1, with wins over The Citadel, VMI, Yale, Columbia, and West Virginia, a scoreless tie with Notre Dame, and losses to Harvard, Penn and Navy. The loss to the midshipmen was followed eight days later by the attack on Pearl Harbor.

In 1942 he was named by Collier's Weekly as its "Lineman of the Year" and by Grantland Rice as "Player of the Year." Olds was also selected as an All-American as the cadets compiled a 6–3 record, beating Lafayette College, Cornell, Columbia, Harvard, VMI, and Princeton, and falling to Notre Dame, Penn, and Navy. In the Army–Navy Game of 1942, which was played at Annapolis instead of Philadelphia, Olds had both upper front teeth knocked out when he received a forearm blow to the mouth while making a tackle. Olds returned to the game and reportedly was cheered by the Navy Third and Fourth Classes, which were assigned as the Army cheering section when wartime travel restrictions prevented the Corps of Cadets from attending. In 1985 Olds was enshrined in the College Football Hall of Fame.

Olds developed ambivalent feelings about West Point, admiring its dedication to "Duty, Honor, Country", but disturbed by the tendency of many tactical officers to distort the purpose of its Honor Code. In March 1943, Olds was braced by an officer upon returning from leave in New York City, and compelled on penalty of an honor violation to admit he had consumed alcohol. The infraction reduced him in rank from cadet captain to cadet private, characterized by Olds in his memoirs as "only the second cadet in the history of West Point to earn that dubious honor."

He walked punishment tours until the day of his graduation in June. The incident left its mark on Olds such that when he became Commandant of Cadets at the Air Force Academy, use of the Honor Code as an instrument for integrity rather than as a tool for petty enforcement of discipline became a point of emphasis in his administration. During his Academy years Olds also acquired a strong contempt for alumni networking, commonly called "ring knocking", to the degree that he went out of his way to conceal his West Point background.

By an act of Congress on October 1, 1942, during Olds' second class year, the academy began a three-year curriculum for the duration of the war for cadets entering after July 1939. Cadets applying to the Air Corps were classified as Air Cadets, with a modified curriculum which provided flying training but eliminated Military Topography and Graphics required for Ground Cadets. Olds' class was given an abridged second class course of study until January 19, 1943, when it began an abridged first class course.

Olds completed primary training in the summer of 1942 at the Spartan School of Aviation in Tulsa, Oklahoma, and basic and advanced training at Stewart Field, New York. 208 cadets including Olds completed the course, while five classmates died in accidents. Olds received his pilot's wings personally from Gen. Henry H. Arnold on May 30, 1943, and graduated on June 1 as a member of the Class of June 1943, 194th in general merit of 514 graduates.

== World War II fighter pilot ==
=== P-38 Lightning missions ===
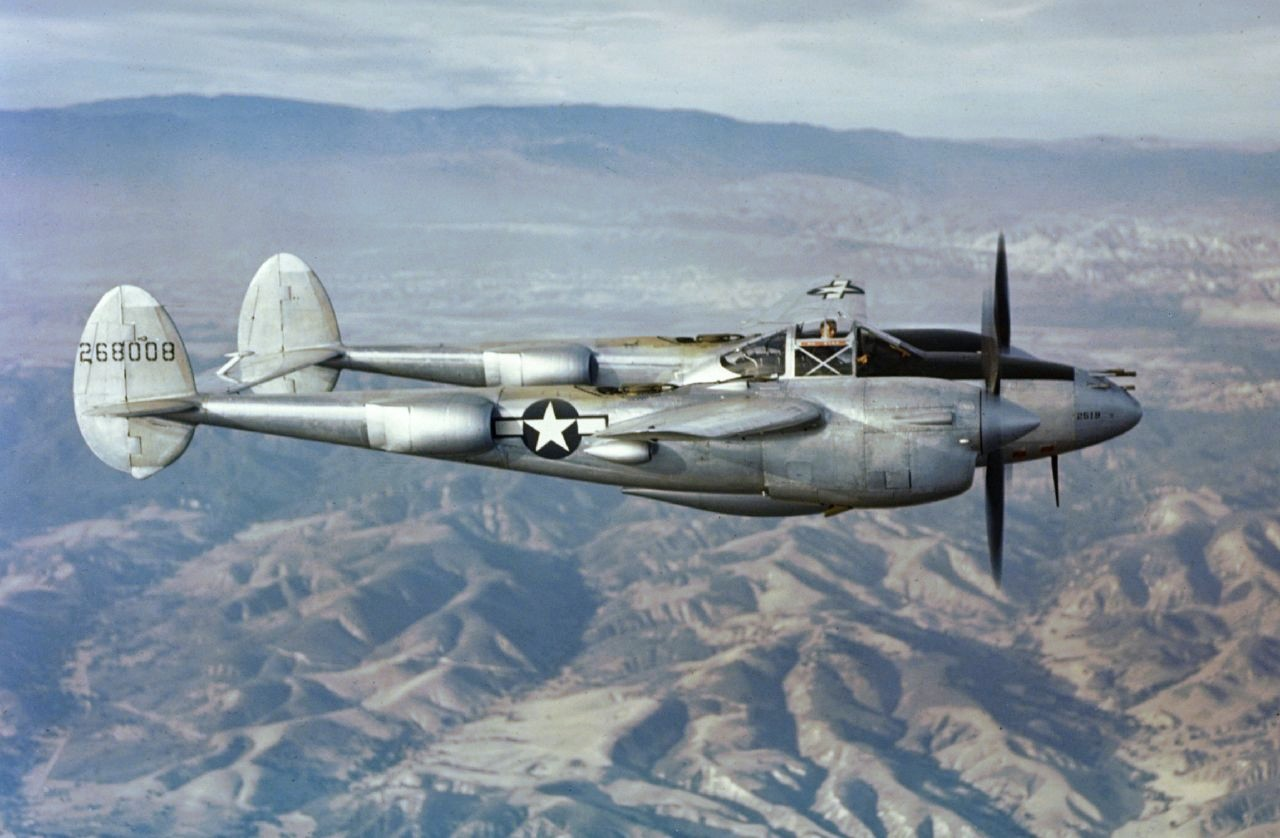
P-38J Lightning

Second lieutenant Olds completed fighter pilot training with the 329th Fighter Group, an operational training unit based at Grand Central Air Terminal in Glendale, California. His initial twin-engine training at Williams Field, Arizona, was in the Curtiss AT-9, followed by transition fighter training to the Lockheed P-38 Lightning in its P-322 variant. After gunnery training at Matagorda, Texas in the first half of August 1943, he was assigned to P-38 phase training at Muroc Army Air Field, California.

Olds was promoted to first lieutenant on December 1, 1943. In early 1944 he became part of the cadre assigned to build up the newly activated 434th Fighter Squadron and its parent 479th Fighter Group, based at Lomita, California. Olds logged 650 hours of flying time during training, including 250 hours in the P-38 Lightning, as the 479th built its proficiency as a combat group. It departed the Los Angeles area on April 15 for Camp Kilmer, New Jersey, and shipped aboard the USS Argentina for Europe on May 3. The 479th arrived in Scotland on May 14, 1944, and entrained for RAF Wattisham, in eastern England, where it arrived the next day.

The 479th began combat on May 26, flying bomber escort missions and attacking transportation targets in occupied France in advance of the invasion of Normandy. Olds flew a new P-38J Lightning that he nicknamed Scat II. Olds' crew chief, T/Sgt. Glen A. Wold, said that he showed an immediate interest in aircraft maintenance and learned emergency servicing under Wold. He also insisted his aircraft be waxed to reduce air resistance and helped his maintenance crew carry out their tasks. On July 24 Olds was promoted to captain and became a flight and later squadron leader. Following a low-level bridge-bombing mission to Montmirail, France, on August 14, Olds shot down his first German aircraft, a pair of Focke-Wulf Fw 190s.

On an escort mission to Wismar on August 23, his flight was on the far left of the group's line abreast formation and encountered 40–50 Messerschmitt Bf 109s near Wittenberge, flying north at the same 28,000 ft (8,500 m) altitude in a loose formation of three large vees. Olds turned his flight left and began a ten-minute pursuit in which they climbed to altitude above and behind the Germans. Over Bützow, undetected by the Germans, Olds and his wingman jettisoned their fuel drop tanks and attacked, although the second element of the flight had been unable to keep up during the climb.

Just as Olds began firing, both engines of his P-38 quit from fuel exhaustion; in the excitement of the attack he had neglected to switch to his internal fuel tanks. He continued attacking in "dead-stick mode", hitting his target in the fuselage and shooting off part of its engine cowling. After fatally damaging the Bf 109 he dived away and restarted his engines. Despite battle damage to his own plane, including loss of a side window of its canopy, Olds shot down two during the dogfight and another on the way home to become the first ace of the 479th FG. His combat report for that date concluded:

Still in a shallow dive, I observed a P-38 and a Me 109 going round and round. It seemed that the 38 needed help so I started down. At about 4,000 ft (1,200 m), the Jerry, still way out of my range, turned under me and slightly to the right. I rolled over on my back, following him and gave him an ineffective burst at long range. By this time I was traveling in excess of 500 mph (800 km/h). My left window blew out, scaring the hell out of me. I thought I had been hit by some of the ground fire I had observed in the vicinity. I regained control of the aircraft and pulled out above a wheat field. I tried to contact the flight to get myself recognized, but observed an Me 109 making a pass at me from about seven o'clock high. I broke left as well as my plane could and the Jerry overshot. I straightened out and gave him a burst. He chandelled steeply to the left and I shot some more. He passed right over me and I slipped over in an Immelmann. As I straightened out at the top, I saw the pilot bail out.

Although in Dogfights S1EP2, Robin Olds recounts this memory of the P-38 needing help with some variance. He says "I went on into the fight, got another one, BE (His wing man) got two others with one pass. Then I looked down and there was a North American P-51 Mustang, and where he came from; I have no idea." The Narrator then tells the viewers that the P-51 Mustang is being chased by two Bf 109s. Olds dove to help and in his excitement dove too fast. This led him to be subject to compressibility. Upon reaching the denser air at lower altitudes he regained control of his P-38 and pulled up. This led to his canopy window blowing out due to excess G forces. He said "It sounds like an exaggeration but I managed to pull out, right above this wheat field near the town of Rostock." That made him one of very few that have recovered from a compressibility event. "After that I had enough, I was ready to go home" But a string of tracer fire across his nose brought him right back into the fight, as a Bf 109 dove from behind on him. Weighing his options, he decided to risk it all and flat planed. While pulling hard on the yoke and turning hard left at 90°. That made him shutter into a high speed stall, the air combat equivalent of locking the brakes. The Bf 109 passed beneath him and as he rolled the nose down he fired, taking the Bf 109 out before heading home.

He made eight claims while flying the P-38 (five of which are sustained by the Air Force Historical Research Agency) and was originally credited as the top-scoring P-38 pilot of the European Theater of Operations.

=== P-51 Mustang pilot ===
The 479th FG converted to the P-51 Mustang in mid-September. On his second transition flight, at the point of touchdown during landing, Olds learned a lesson in "false confidence" when the powerful torque of the single-engined fighter forced him to ground loop after the Mustang veered off the runway. Olds shot down an Fw 190 in his new Scat VI on October 6 during a savage battle near Berlin in which he was nearly shot down by his own wingman. He completed his first combat tour on November 9, 1944, accruing 270 hours of combat time and six kills.

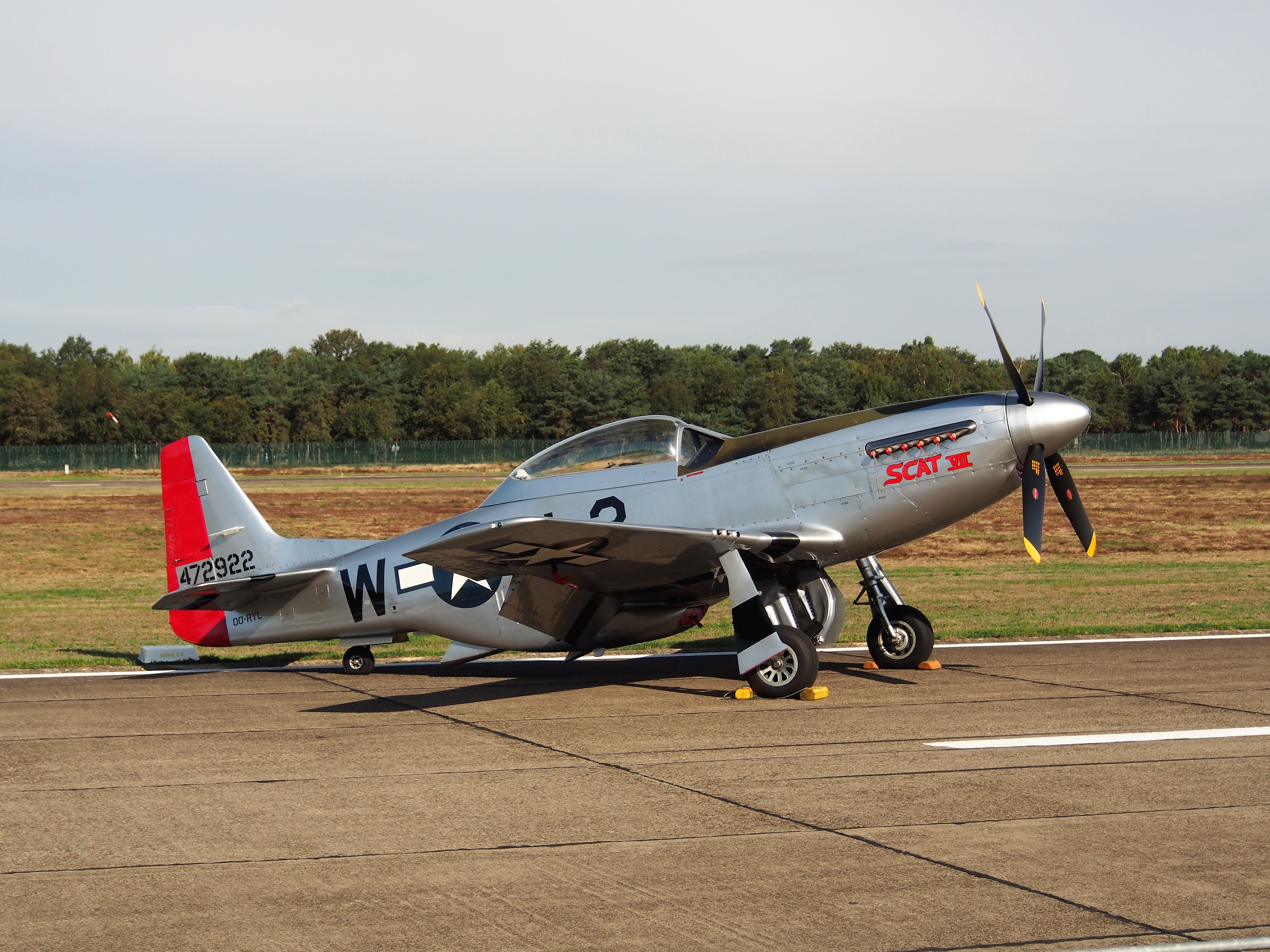
Olds' P-51 Scat VII (located and registered in Belgium). It survived World War II and is preserved in its wartime color scheme.

After returning to the United States for a two-month leave, Olds began a full second tour at Wattisham on January 15, 1945. He was assigned duties as operations officer of the 434th Fighter squadron. Promoted to major on February 9, 1945, Olds claimed his seventh victory southeast of Magdeburg, Germany the same day, downing another Bf 109. On February 14, he claimed three victories, two Bf 109s and an Fw 190, but one of the former was credited only as a "probable".

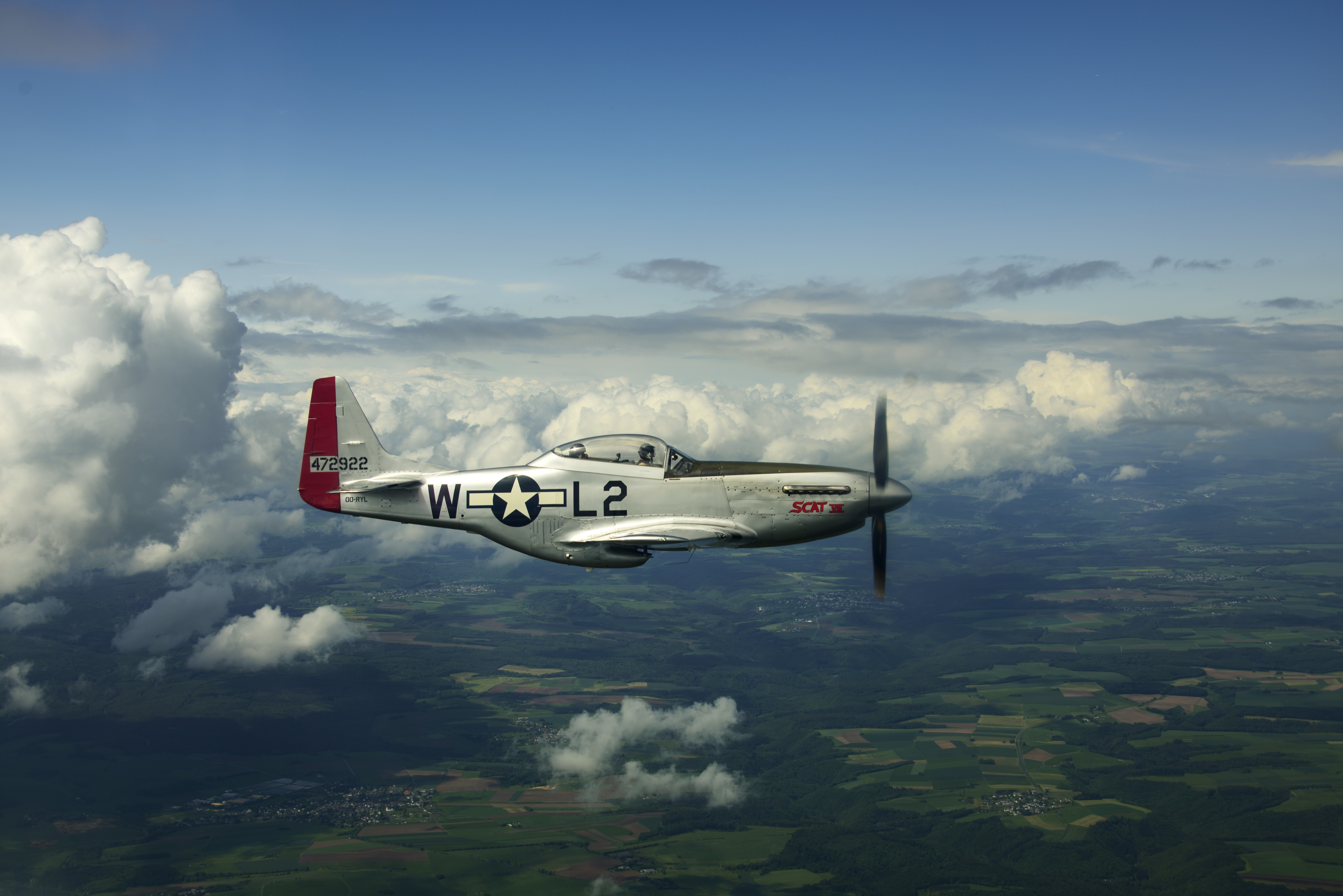
Olds' P-51 Scat VII in flight in 2019

His final World War II aerial kill occurred on April 7, 1945, when Olds in Scat VI led the 479th Fighter Group on a mission escorting B-24s bombing an ammunition dump in Lüneburg, Germany. The engagement marked the only combat appearance of Sonderkommando Elbe, a German Air Force squadron formed to ram Allied bombers. South of Bremen, Olds noticed contrails popping up above a bank of cirrus clouds, of aircraft flying above and to the left of the bombers. For five minutes these bogeys paralleled the bomber stream while the 479th held station. Turning to investigate, Olds saw pairs of Me 262s turn towards and dive on the Liberators. After damaging one of the jets in a chase meant to lure the fighter escort away from the bombers, the Mustangs returned to the bomber stream. Olds observed a Bf 109 of Sonderkommando Elbe attack the bombers and shoot down a B-24. Olds pursued the Bf 109 through the formation, and shot it down.

Olds achieved the bulk of his strafing credits the following week in attacks on Lübeck Blankensee and Tarnewitz airdromes on April 13, and Reichersberg airfield in Austria on April 16, when he destroyed six German planes on the ground. He later reflected on the hazards of such missions:

I was hit by flak as I was pulling out of a dive-strafing pass on an airfield called Tarnewitz, up on the Baltic. Five P-51s made a pass on the airdrome that April day. I was the only one to return home...When I tested the stall characteristics of my wounded bird over our home airfield, I found it quit flying at a little over 175 mph (282 km/h) indicated and rolled violently into the dead wing (note: the right flap had been blown away and two large holes knocked in the same wing). What to do? Bailout seemed the logical response, but here's where sentiment got in the way of reason. That airplane (note: "Scat VI") had taken me through a lot and I was damned if I was going to give up on her...why the bird and I survived the careening, bouncing and juttering ride down the length of the field, I guess I'll never know.

Olds had not only risen in rank to field grade, but was given command of his squadron on March 25, less than two years out of West Point and at only 22 years of age. By the end of his combat service he was officially credited with 12 German planes shot down and 11.5 others destroyed on the ground. Olds became an ace on both of his combat tours and was twice awarded the Silver Star, for the mission of August 25 and for the achievements of himself and his squadron during his combined tours.

As recognized by the American Fighter Aces Association, Olds was the only pilot to "make ace" in both the P-38 (5 victories) and the P-51 (8 victories).

== Postwar highlights and assignments ==
Returning to the United States after the war, Olds was assigned at West Point as an assistant football coach for Red Blaik. Apparently resented by many on the staff for his rapid rise in rank and plethora of combat decorations, Olds transferred in February 1946 to the 412th Fighter Group at March Field, California, to fly the Lockheed P-80 Shooting Star, which began a career-long professional struggle with superiors he viewed as more promotion- than warrior-minded.

In April 1946, he and Lieutenant Colonel John C. "Pappy" Herbst formed what he believed was the Air Force's first jet aerobatic demonstration team. In late May, the 412th was ordered to undertake Project Comet, a nine-city transcontinental mass formation flight. Olds and Herbst performed a two-ship aerobatic routine that thrilled the crowds at every stop, the highlight being a three-day layover in Washington, D.C. In June, Olds was one of four pilots who participated in the first one-day, dawn-to-dusk, transcontinental round trip jet flight from March Field to Washington, D.C.

The jet demonstration performances with Herbst ended tragically on July 4, 1946, when Herbst crashed at the Del Mar Racetrack after his aircraft stalled during an encore of their routine finale in which the P-80s did a loop while configured to land. Later that same year Olds took second place in the Thompson Trophy Race (Jet Division) of the Cleveland National Air Races at Brook Park, Ohio, over the Labor Day weekend. In this first "closed course" jet race, six P-80s competed against each other on a three pylon course 30 miles in length.

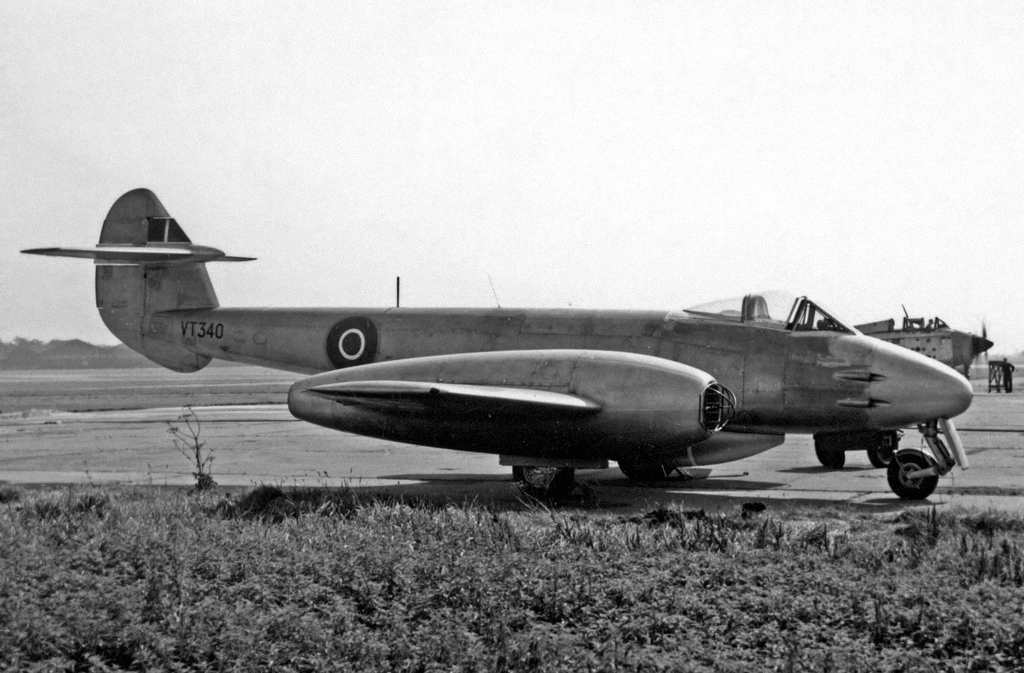
RAF Gloster Meteor

Olds went to England under the U.S. Air Force/Royal Air Force Exchange Program in 1948. Flying the Gloster Meteor jet fighter, he commanded No. 1 Squadron at Royal Air Force Station Tangmere between October 20, 1948, and September 25, 1949, the first foreigner to command an RAF unit in peacetime. Following his exchange assignment, Olds returned to March AFB to become operations officer of the 94th Fighter Squadron of the 1st Fighter Group, flying North American F-86A Sabres, on November 15, 1949.

Olds was assigned to command the 71st Fighter Squadron, which was soon detached from the 1st FG to the Air Defense Command and based at the Greater Pittsburgh Airport in Pennsylvania. As a result, he missed service in the Korean War despite repeated applications for a combat assignment. Discouraged and at odds with the Air Force, in which he was seen as an iconoclast, Olds reportedly was in the process of resigning when he was talked out of it by a mentor, Maj Gen Frederic H. Smith Jr., who brought him to work at Eastern Air Defense Command headquarters at Stewart AFB, New York.

Promoted to lieutenant colonel on February 20, 1951, and colonel April 15, 1953, while just thirty years of age and just short of ten years from his graduation from West Point, Olds served unenthusiastically in several staff assignments until returning to flying in 1955. At first on the command staff of the 86th Fighter-Interceptor Wing at Landstuhl Air Base, West Germany, Olds then commanded its Sabre-equipped 86th Fighter-Interceptor Group from October 8, 1955, to August 10, 1956. He then was made chief of the Weapons Proficiency Center at Wheelus Air Base, Libya, in charge of all fighter weapons training for the United States Air Forces Europe until July 1958.

Olds had administrative and staff duty assignments at the Pentagon between 1958 and 1962 as the Deputy Chief, Air Defense Division, Headquarters USAF. In this assignment he prepared a number of papers, iconoclastic at the time, which soon became prophetic, including identifying the need for upgraded conventional munitions (foretelling the "bomb shortage" of the Vietnam War), and the lack of any serious tactical air training in conventional warfare. From November 1959 to March 1960, his section worked intensely to develop a program reducing the entire structure of the ADC with the purpose of generating $6.5 billion for classified funding to develop the Lockheed SR-71 Blackbird reconnaissance aircraft. Following his Pentagon assignment, Olds attended the National War College in Washington D.C., graduating in 1963.

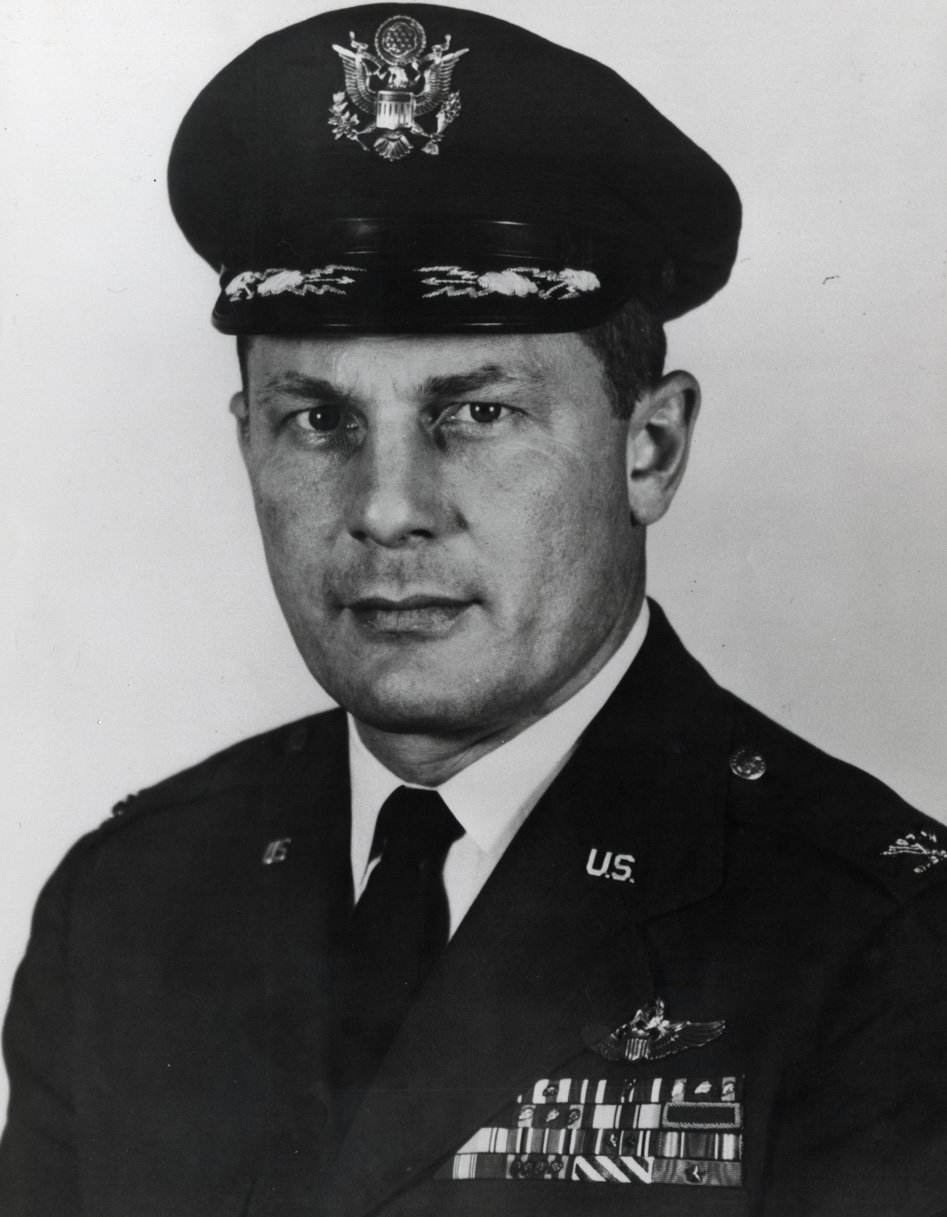
Portrait of Colonel Robin Olds

Olds next became commander of the 81st Tactical Fighter Wing at RAF Bentwaters, England, a McDonnell F-101 Voodoo fighter-bomber wing, on September 8, 1963. The 81st TFW was a major combat unit in United States Air Forces Europe, having both a tactical nuclear and conventional bombing role supporting NATO. Olds commanded the wing until July 26, 1965. As his Deputy Commander of Operations Olds brought with him Colonel Daniel "Chappie" James Jr., whom he had met during his Pentagon assignment and who would go on to become the first African-American 4-star Air Force general. James and Olds worked closely together for a year as a command team and developed both a professional and social relationship which was later renewed in combat.

Olds formed a demonstration team for the F-101 using pilots of his wing, without command authorization, and performed at an Air Force open house at Bentwaters. He asserted that his superior at Third Air Force attempted to have him court-martialed, but the commander of USAFE, General Gabriel P. Disosway, instead authorized his removal from command of the 81st TFW, cancellation of a recommended Legion of Merit award, and transfer to the headquarters of the Ninth Air Force at Shaw Air Force Base, South Carolina.

In September 1966, Olds was tapped to command an McDonnell Douglas F-4C Phantom wing in Southeast Asia. En route he arranged with the 4453rd Combat Crew Training Wing, Davis-Monthan Air Force Base, Arizona, (where Col. James was now Deputy Commander of Operations) to be checked out in the Phantom, completing the 14-step syllabus in just five days. His instructor was Major William L. Kirk, the 4453rd CCTW's Standardization and Evaluation officer, who had been one of Olds' pilots at RAF Bentwaters, and who later commanded the United States Air Forces Europe as a full general. Kirk accompanied Olds for practice firing of AIM-7 Sparrow and AIM-9 Sidewinder missiles on the Point Mugu missile range while Olds was en route to Travis Air Force Base for his charter flight overseas. Olds rewarded Kirk by granting him a transfer to his command in Thailand in March 1967.

== Vietnam ==
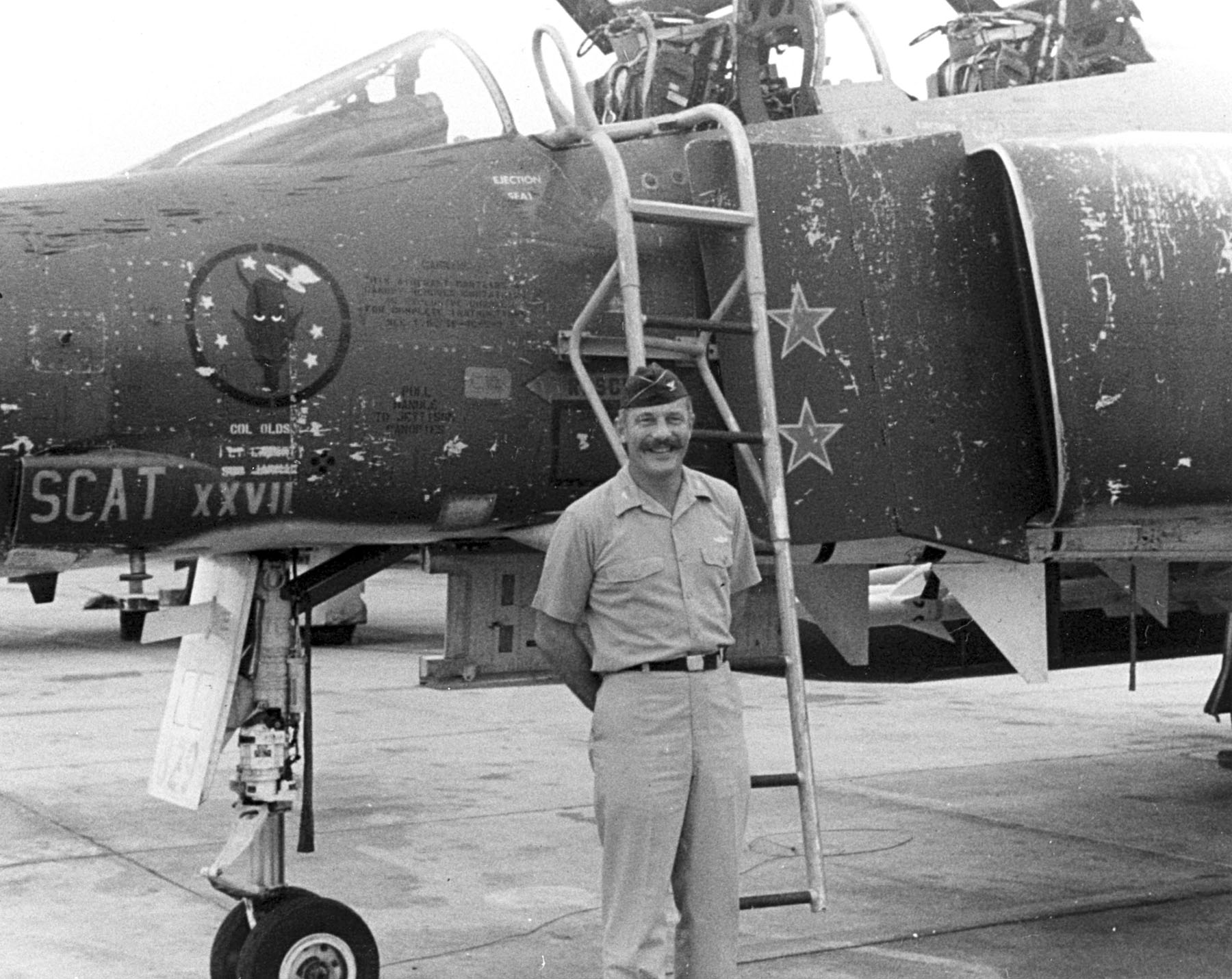
Robin Olds beside F-4C Phantom II "Scat XXVII", which he flew during his 1966–1967 combat tour as the 8th TFW CO. Above the "Scat" markings, this aircraft also displays the insignia of the 433rd Tactical Fighter Squadron, nicknamed the "Satan's Angels".

On September 30, 1966, Olds took command of the 8th Tactical Fighter Wing, based at Ubon Royal Thai Air Force Base. A lack of aggressiveness and sense of purpose in the wing had led to the change in command (Olds' predecessor had flown only 12 missions during the 10 months the wing had been in combat). The 44-year-old colonel also set the tone for his command stint by immediately placing himself on the flight schedule as a rookie pilot under officers junior to himself, then challenging them to train him properly because he would soon be leading them.

Olds' vice commander was Col. Vermont Garrison, an ace in both World War II and Korea, and in December Olds brought in Daniel James Jr. to replace an ineffective deputy commander for operations, creating arguably the strongest and most effective tactical command triumvirate of the Vietnam War. The Olds-James combination became popularly nicknamed "Blackman and Robin". (Note: A private site asserts that this was a derogatory comment, and that they were usually referred to as "Batman and Robin", after the TV series then airing.) James was named 8th TFW Vice Commander in June 1967, succeeding Garrison, who had completed his tour. Olds took to the air war over North Vietnam in an F-4C Phantom he nicknamed "Scat XXVII", in keeping with his previous combat aircraft that all carried the "Scat" name.

=== MiG kills ===
After suggesting the idea to Seventh Air Force commander Major General William Momyer, himself a former commander of the 8th TFW, Olds was directed to plan a mission designed to draw the North Vietnamese Mikoyan-Gurevich MiG-21s into an aerial trap, and "Operation Bolo" resulted.

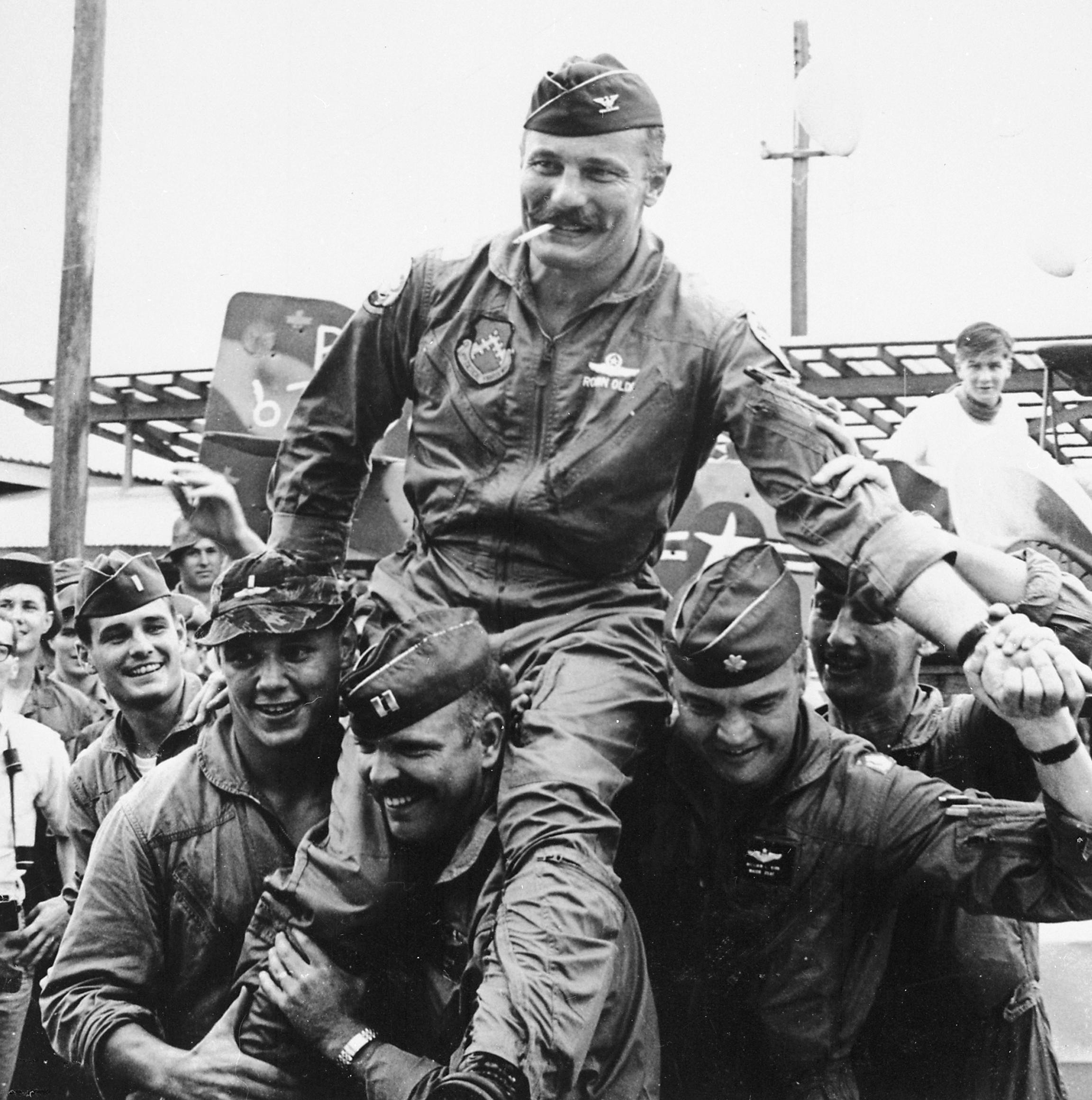
"Wolfpack" aviators of the 8th Tactical Fighter Wing carry their commanding officer, Colonel Robin Olds, following his return from his last combat mission over North Vietnam, on 23 September 1967

In October 1966, strike force Republic F-105 Thunderchiefs were equipped with QRC-160 radar jamming pods whose effectiveness virtually ended their losses to surface-to-air missiles. As a result, SAM attacks shifted to the Phantoms, which were unprotected because of a shortage of pods. To protect the F-4s, rules of engagement that allowed the MiG Combat Air Patrol to escort the strike force in and out of the target area were revised in December to restrict MiGCAP penetration to the edge of SAM coverage. MiG interceptions increased as a result, primarily by MiG-21s using high-speed hit-and-run tactics against bomb-laden F-105 formations, and although only two bombers had been lost, the threat to the force was perceived as serious.

The Bolo plan reasoned that by equipping F-4s with jamming pods, using the call signs and communications codewords of the F-105 wings, and flying their flight profiles through northwest Vietnam, the F-4s could effectively simulate an F-105 bombing mission and entice the MiG-21s into intercepting not bomb-laden Thunderchiefs, but Phantoms configured for air-to-air combat.

After an intensive planning, maintenance, and briefing period, the mission was scheduled for January 1, 1967. Poor weather caused a 24-hour delay, but even then, a solid overcast covered the North Vietnamese airbases at Phúc Yên, Gia Lam, Kép, and Cat Bai when the bogus strike force began arriving over the target area, five-minute intervals separating the flights of F-4s. Leading the first flight, Olds overflew the primary MiG-21 base at Phúc Yên and was on a second pass when MiGs finally began popping up through the cloud base. Although at first seemingly random in nature, it quickly became apparent that the MiGs were ground-controlled intercepts designed to place the supposed F-105s in a vise between enemies to their front and rear.

The F-4s and their crews, however, proved equal to the situation and claimed seven MiG-21s destroyed, almost half of the 16 then in service with the VPAF without loss to USAF aircraft. Olds himself shot down one of the seven, for which he and the other aircrew were awarded Silver Stars. Follow-up interceptions over the next two days by MiGs against RF-4C reconnaissance aircraft led to a similar mission on a smaller scale on January 6, with another two MiG-21s shot down. VPAF fighter activity diminished to almost nothing for 10 weeks afterwards, thereby accomplishing the main goal of Operation Bolo: to eliminate or diminish the threat of MiGs to the strike formations.

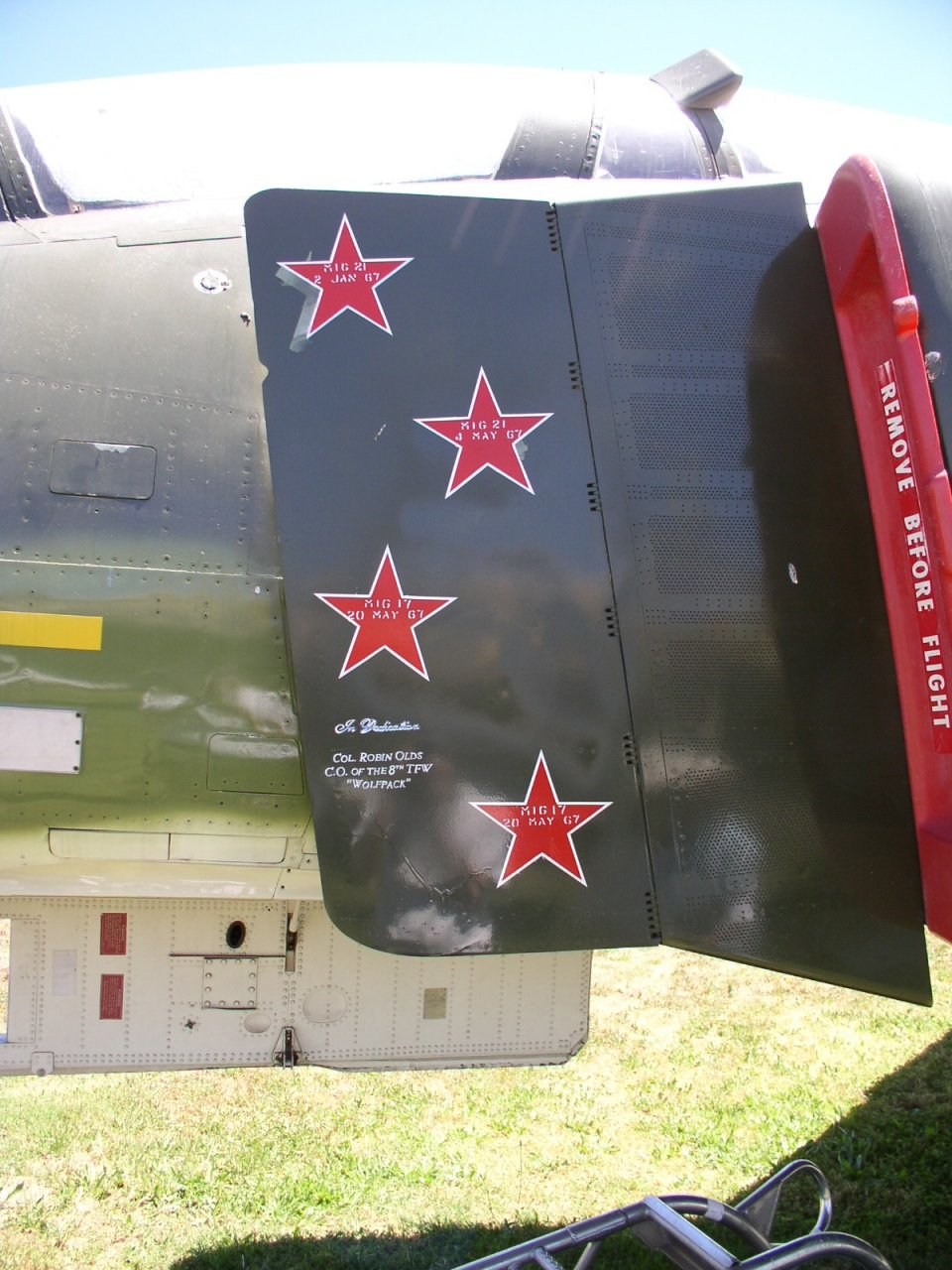
Olds' MiG scoreboard on splitter vane of a McDonnell F-4C Phantom II

On May 4, Olds destroyed another MiG-21 over Phúc Yên. Two weeks later, on May 20, he destroyed two MiG-17s in what one of his pilots described as a "vengeful chase" after they shot down his wingman during a large dogfight, bringing his total to 16 confirmed kills (12 in World War II and four in Vietnam) and making him a triple ace. Olds states that following the shoot down of his fourth MiG, he intentionally avoided shooting down a fifth, even though he had at least ten opportunities to do so, because he had learned in the middle of June that Seventh Air Force, at the direction of Secretary of the Air Force Harold Brown, would immediately relieve him of command to return to the United States as a publicity asset if he did.

He was awarded a fourth Silver Star for leading a three-aircraft low-level bombing strike on March 30, 1967, and the Air Force Cross for an attack on the Paul Doumer Bridge in Hanoi on August 11, one of five awarded to Air Force pilots for that mission. He flew his final combat mission over North Vietnam on September 23, 1967.

His 259 total combat missions included 107 in World War II and 152 in Southeast Asia, 105 of those over North Vietnam. Scat XXVII (F-4C-24-MC 64-0829) was retired from operational service and placed on display at the National Museum of the United States Air Force, Wright-Patterson Air Force Base, Ohio.

=== Olds' mustache ===
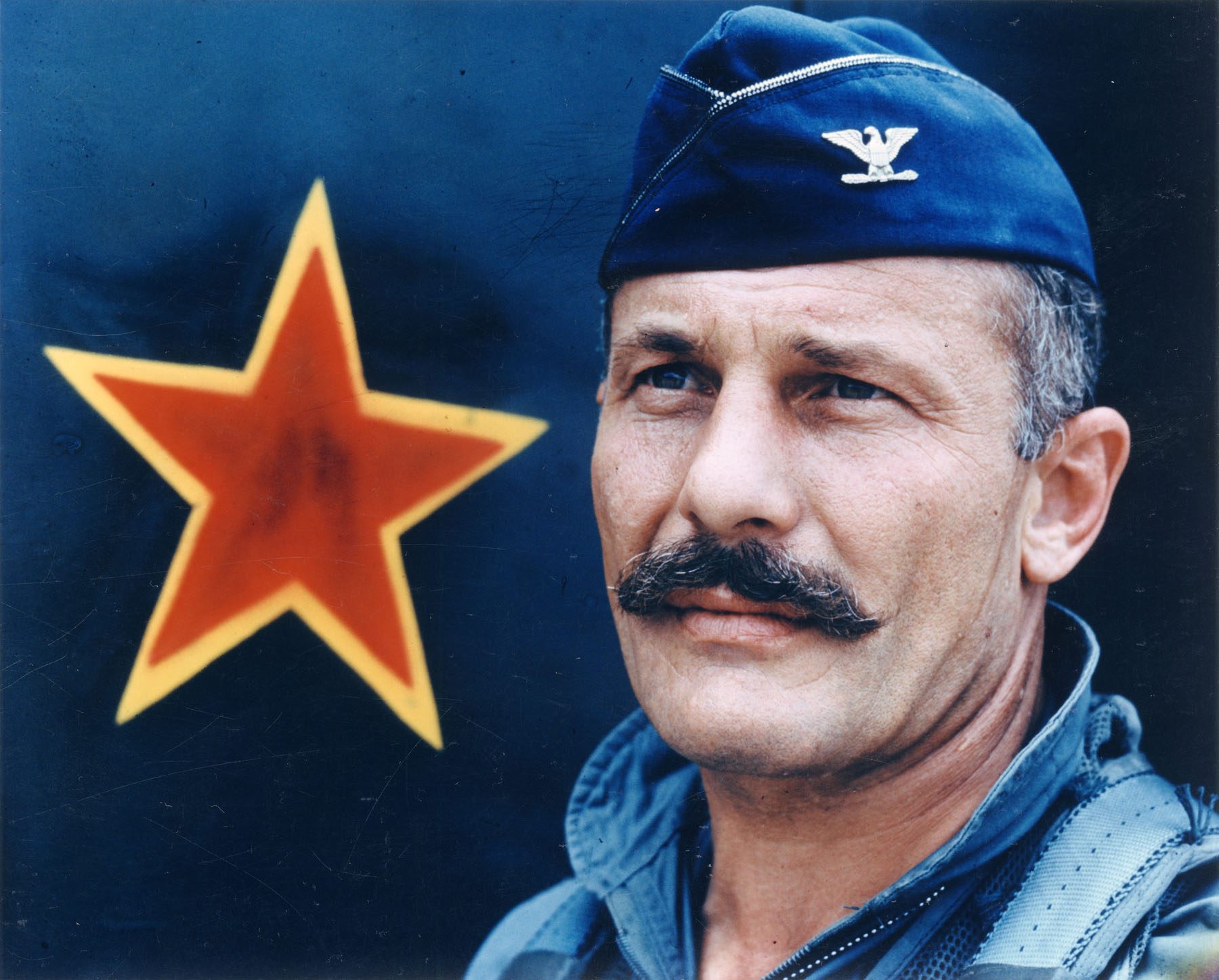
Olds during the Vietnam War sporting his trademark handlebar mustache

Olds was known for the extravagantly waxed (and decidedly non-regulation) handlebar moustache he sported in Vietnam. It was a common superstition among airmen to grow a "bulletproof mustache", but Olds also used his as "a gesture of defiance. The kids on base loved it. Most everybody grew a mustache." Olds started the mustache in the wake of the success of Operation Bolo and let it grow beyond regulation length because "It became the middle finger I couldn't raise in the PR photographs. The mustache became my silent last word in the verbal battles...with higher headquarters on rules, targets, and fighting the war." Returning home, however, marked the end of this flamboyance. When he reported to his first interview with Air Force Chief of Staff General John P. McConnell, McConnell walked up to him, stuck a finger under his nose and said, "Take it off." Olds replied, "Yes, sir."

For his part, Olds was not upset with the order, recalling:

To tell the truth, I wasn't all that fond of the damned thing by then, but it had become a symbol for the men of the 8th Wing. I knew McConnell understood. During his visits to Ubon over the past year he had never referred to my breach of military standards, just seemed rather amused at the variety of 'staches sported by many of the troops. (It) was the most direct order I had received in twenty-four years of service.

The incident with the mustache is given credit as the impetus for a new Air Force tradition, "Mustache March", in which aircrew, aircraft maintainers, and other airmen worldwide show solidarity by a symbolic, albeit good-natured "protest" for one month against Air Force facial hair regulations.

=== Dogfighting advocate ===
We weren't allowed to dogfight. Very little attention was paid to strafing, dive-bombing, rocketry, stuff like that. It was thought to be unnecessary. Yet every confrontation America faced in the Cold War years was a 'bombs and bullets' situation, raging under an uneasy nuclear standoff." The Vietnam War "proved the need to teach tactical warfare and have fighter pilots. It caught us unprepared because we weren't allowed to learn it or practice it in training.

Olds often lamented the lack of an internal gun in the F-4C he flew during his tour in Vietnam, but would not allow his fighters to be equipped with the gun pods then available. While he knew that he would be capable of effectively using them, he was also aware that none of his pilots were trained in the use of a gun or dogfighting. He also reasoned that the drag of the pod would both degrade the performance characteristics of the F-4 while not gaining it any advantage against the more maneuverable MiG-17s and MiG-21s, result in unnecessary losses strafing worthless targets, and reduce the number of bombs carried by the Phantoms, the delivery of which was the 8th's primary mission.

Operation Bolo, and P-38 dogfights Olds experienced were recreated using computer animation in the episode "Air Ambush", of The History Channel Dogfights series, first telecast on November 10, 2006. His third and fourth MiG kills in Vietnam were recreated in the season 2 episode "No Room For Error". Olds, then 84 years old, appeared as a commentator.

== Post-Southeast Asia career ==
=== Air Force Academy 1967–71 ===
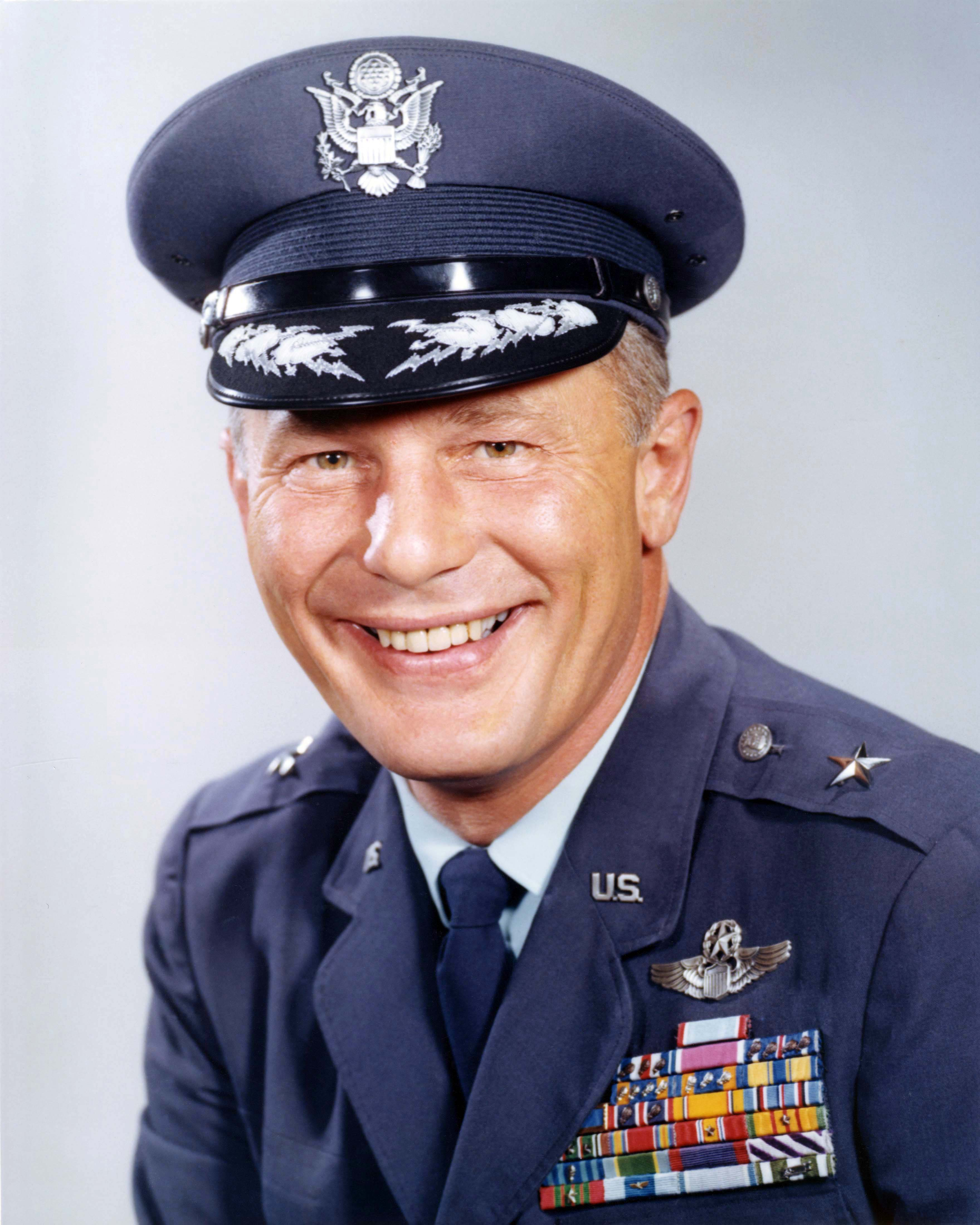
Official portrait of Brigadier General Robin Olds as Commandant of Cadets at the United States Air Force Academy, c. 1967–71

After relinquishing command of the 8th TFW on September 23, 1967, Olds reported for duty to the United States Air Force Academy in Colorado Springs, Colorado, in December 1967. He served as commandant of cadets for three years and sought to restore morale in the wake of a major cheating scandal. Olds was promoted to brigadier general on June 1, 1968, with seniority dating from May 28.

=== Director of Aerospace Safety ===
In February 1971 he began his last duty assignment as director of aerospace safety in the Office of the Inspector General, Headquarters USAF, and after December 1971 as part of the Air Force Inspection and Safety Center, a newly activated separate operating agency located at Norton Air Force Base, California. Olds oversaw the creation of policies, standards, and procedures for Air Force accident prevention programs, and dealt with work safety education, workplace accident investigation and analysis, and safety inspections.

=== 1971 inspector general tour and 1973 retirement ===
Air Force Inspector General and Olds' West Point classmate Lt Gen Louis L. Wilson Jr. sent Olds to Southeast Asia in the autumn of 1971 to determine the state of readiness of Air Force pilots. Olds toured USAF bases in Thailand (flying several unauthorized combat missions in the process) and brought back a blunt assessment. Air Force pilots, he reported to the Air Force Chief of Staff, Gen John D. Ryan (a former SAC general and bomber pilot often at odds with the tactical fighter community), "...couldn't fight their way out of a wet paper bag," because of a systemic lack of interest by the USAF in air-to-air combat training for fighter crews. He warned that losses would be severe in any resumption of aerial combat. Olds recalled that Ryan expressed surprise at this assessment and reflected his disagreement.

When the Operation Linebacker bombing campaign began in May 1972, American fighter jets returned to the offense in the skies over North Vietnam for the first time in nearly four years. Navy and Marine Corps fighters, reaping the benefits of their TOPGUN program, immediately enjoyed considerable success. In contrast by June, as Olds had predicted, the Air Force's fighter community was struggling with a nearly 1:1 kill-loss ratio. To the new Inspector General, Lt Gen Ernest C. Hardin Jr., Olds offered to take a voluntary reduction in rank to colonel so he could return to operational command and straighten out the situation. Olds decided to leave the Air Force when the offer was refused (he was offered another inspection tour instead) and he retired on June 1, 1973.

== Aerial victory credits ==
Aerial victories
| Date | # | Type | Location | Aircraft flown | Unit Assigned |
|---|---|---|---|---|---|
| August 14, 1944 | 2 | Focke-Wulf Fw 190 | Montmirail, France | P-38J Lightning | 434 FS, 479 FG |
| August 25, 1944 | 3 | Messerschmitt Bf 109 | Bützow, Germany | P-38J | 434 FS, 479 FG |
| October 6, 1944 | 1 | Fw 190 | Berlin, Germany | P-51D Mustang | 434 FS, 479 FG |
| February 9, 1945 | 1 | Bf 109 | Magdeburg, Germany | P-51D | 434 FS, 479 FG |
| February 14, 1945 | 1; 1 | Bf 109; Fw 190 | Berlin, Germany | P-51D | 434 FS, 479 FG |
| March 19, 1945 | 1; 1 | Bf 109; Fw 190 | Münster, Germany | P-51D | 434 FS, 479 FG |
| April 7, 1945 | 1 | Bf 109 | Dümmer lake, Germany | P-51D | 434 FS, 479 FG |
| January 2, 1967 | 1 | MiG-21 | Phúc Yên, Vietnam | F-4C Phantom II | 555th TFS, 8th TFW |
| May 4, 1967 | 1 | MiG-21 | Phúc Yên, Vietnam | F-4C | 555th TFS, 8th TFW |
| May 20, 1967 | 2 | MiG-17 | Kép Air Base, Vietnam | F-4C | 433th TFS, 8th TFW |

SOURCES: Air Force Historical Study 85: USAF Credits for the Destruction of Enemy Aircraft, World War II and United States Air Force in Southeast Asia: Aces and Aerial Victories – 1965–1973

== Awards and decorations ==
Robin Olds' ribbons as they appeared at retirement.

U.S. Air Force Command Pilot Badge
| Air Force Cross | Air Force Distinguished Service Medal with one bronze oak leaf cluster | Silver Star with three oak leaf clusters |
| Legion of Merit | Distinguished Flying Cross with Valor device and silver oak leaf cluster | Air Medal with four silver oak leaf clusters |
| Air Medal with three silver and one bronze oak leaf clusters (second ribbon required for accoutrement spacing) | Air Medal with oak leaf cluster (third ribbon required for accoutrement spacing) | Air Force Commendation Medal |
| Air Force Presidential Unit Citation with four oak leaf clusters | Air Force Outstanding Unit Award with Valor device and three oak leaf clusters | Air Force Outstanding Unit Award (second ribbon required for accoutrement spacing) |
| American Defense Service Medal | American Campaign Medal | European-African-Middle Eastern Campaign Medal with silver and bronze campaign stars |
| World War II Victory Medal | National Defense Service Medal with one bronze service star | Vietnam Service Medal with two campaign stars |
| Air Force Longevity Service Award with one silver and one bronze oak leaf clusters | Small Arms Expert Marksmanship Ribbon | Distinguished Flying Cross (United Kingdom) |
| Croix de Guerre with silver star (France) | Vietnam Air Force Distinguished Service Order (2nd Class) | Vietnam Air Gallantry Cross with gold wings |
| Vietnam Air Service Medal, Honor Class | Vietnam Gallantry Cross Unit Citation | Vietnam Campaign Medal |

=== Air Force Cross citation ===
Colonel Robin Olds
U.S. Air Force
Date Of Action: August 11, 1967

The President of the United States of America, authorized by Title 10, Section 8742, United States Code, takes pleasure in presenting the Air Force Cross to Colonel Robin Olds (AFSN: 0-26046), United States Air Force, for extraordinary heroism in military operations against an opposing armed force while serving as Strike Mission Commander in the 8th Tactical Fighter Wing, Ubon Royal Thai Air Base, Thailand, against the Paul Doumer Bridge, a major north-south transportation link on Hanoi's Red River in North Vietnam, on 11 August 1967. On that date, Colonel Olds led his strike force of eight F-4C aircraft against a key railroad and highway bridge in North Vietnam. Despite intense, accurately directed fire, multiple surface-to-air missile attacks on his force, and continuous harassment by MiG fighters defending the target, Colonel Olds, with undaunted determination, indomitable courage, and professional skill, led his force through to help destroy this significant bridge. As a result the flow of war materials into this area was appreciably reduced. Through his extraordinary heroism, superb airmanship, and aggressiveness in the face of hostile forces, Colonel Olds reflected the highest credit upon himself and the United States Air Force.

=== Other honors ===
In 1968, Olds received the Golden Plate Award of the American Academy of Achievement.

== Effective dates of promotion ==
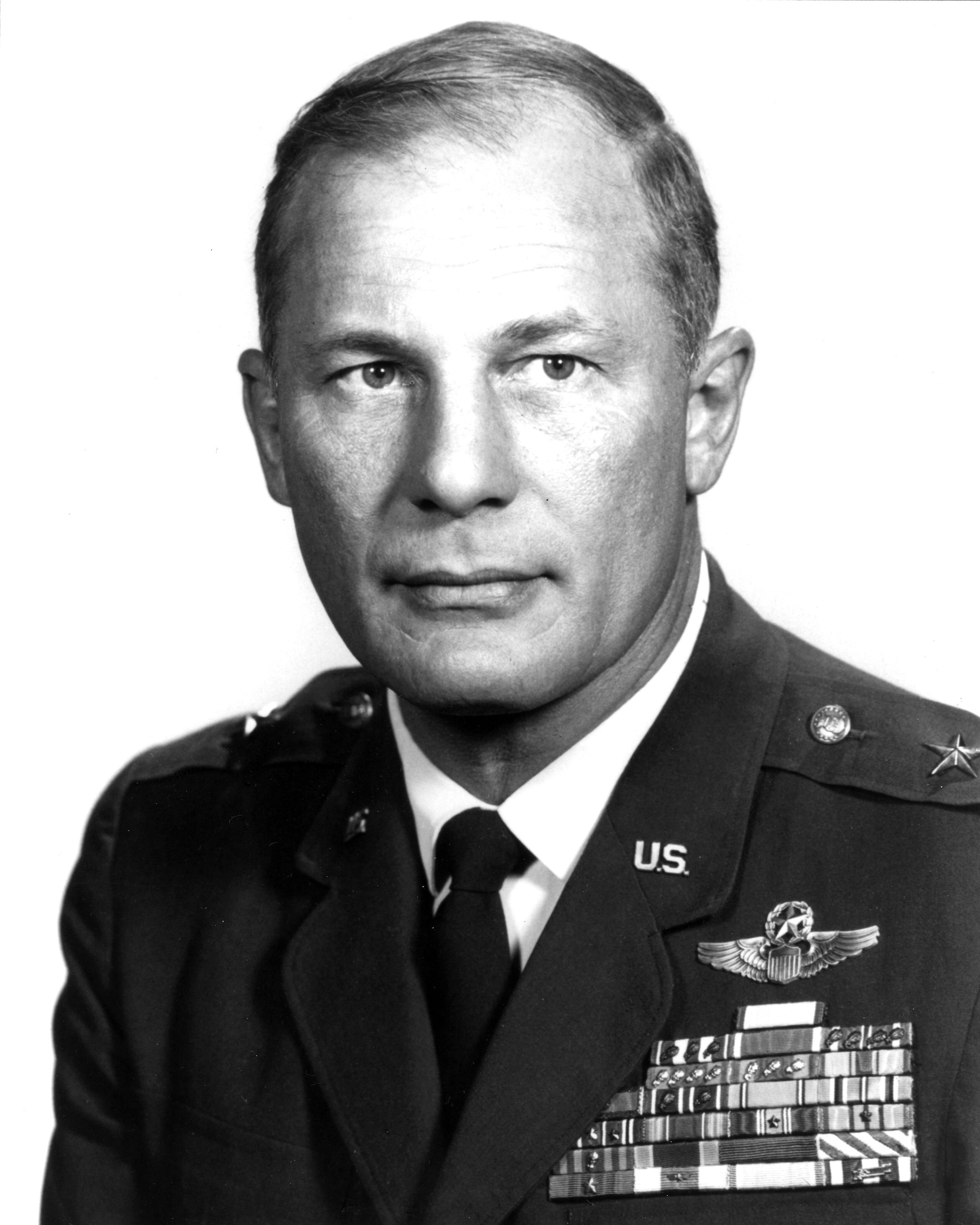
Robin Olds official USAF portrait

| Rank | Date |
|---|---|
| Second Lieutenant | 1 June 1943 |
| First Lieutenant | 1 December 1943 |
| Captain | 24 July 1944 |
| Major | 9 February 1945 |
| Lieutenant Colonel | 20 February 1951 |
| Colonel | 15 April 1953 |
| Brigadier General | 1 June 1968 |

== Personal life ==
Olds was briefly a stepbrother of author Gore Vidal after Olds' father married for the fourth time in June 1942, to Nina Gore Auchincloss. His father died of pneumonia on April 28, 1943, after hospitalization for constrictive pericarditis and Libman-Sacks endocarditis, at the age of 46, just prior to Olds' graduation from West Point.

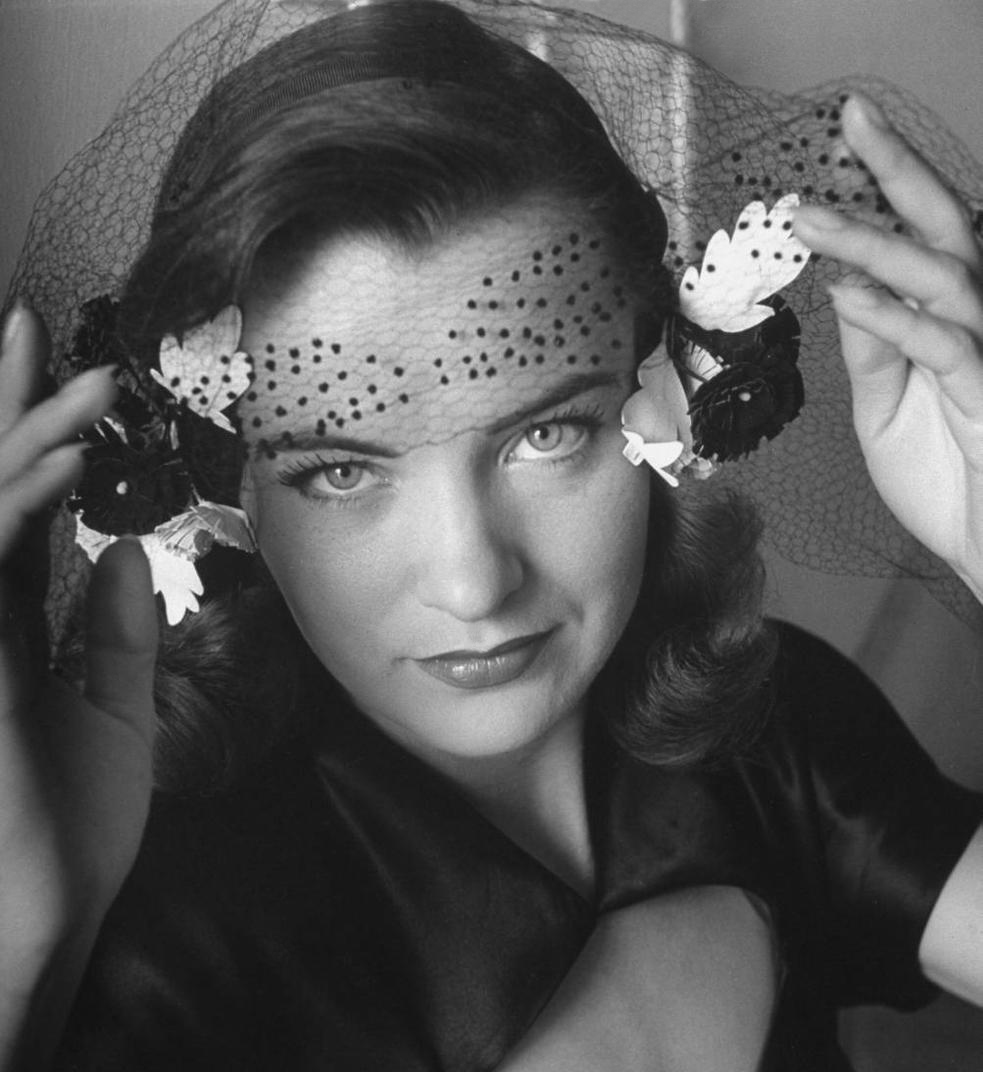
Olds' first wife, actress Ella Raines

In 1946, while based at March Field, Olds met Hollywood actress (and "pin-up girl") Ella Raines on a blind date in Palm Springs. They married in Beverly Hills on February 6, 1947, and had:

- Christina Eloise Olds (1952), formerly married to Eric Newman with whom she has a daughter, Jennifer Olds Newman;
- Susan Bird Scott-Risner (née Olds; 1953–2018), she was married to David Scott-Risner. Her husband has three children from a previous relationship;
- Robert Ernest Olds, who was stillborn in 1958.

Most of their 29-year marriage, marked by frequent extended separations and difficult homecomings, was turbulent because of a clash of lifestyles, particularly her refusal to ever live in government housing on base. Robin Olds and Ella Raines separated in 1975 and divorced in 1976. Robin married Abigail Morgan Sellers Barnett in January 1978, and they divorced after fifteen years of marriage.

In his retirement at Steamboat Springs, Colorado, Olds pursued his love of skiing and served on the city's planning commission. He was active in public speaking, making 21 events as late in his life as 2005 and 13 in 2006.

Olds' fondness for alcohol was well known. John Darrell Sherwood, in his book Fast Movers: Jet Pilots and the Vietnam Experience, posits that Olds' heavy drinking hurt his post-Vietnam career. On July 12, 2001, Olds was arrested for driving under the influence of alcohol and resisting arrest near his home in Steamboat Springs. Olds, briefly hospitalized during the incident for facial cuts, pleaded guilty in return for charges of weaving and felony vehicular eluding being dropped. Olds was placed on one year probation, and ordered to pay almost $900 in fines and costs, attend an alcohol education course, and perform 72 hours of community service.

Days later, on July 21, 2001, Olds was enshrined at Dayton, Ohio, in the National Aviation Hall of Fame Class of 2001, along with test pilot Joe H. Engle, Marine Corps ace Marion E. Carl, and Albert Lee Ueltschi. He became the only person enshrined in both the National Aviation Hall of Fame and the College Football Hall of Fame.

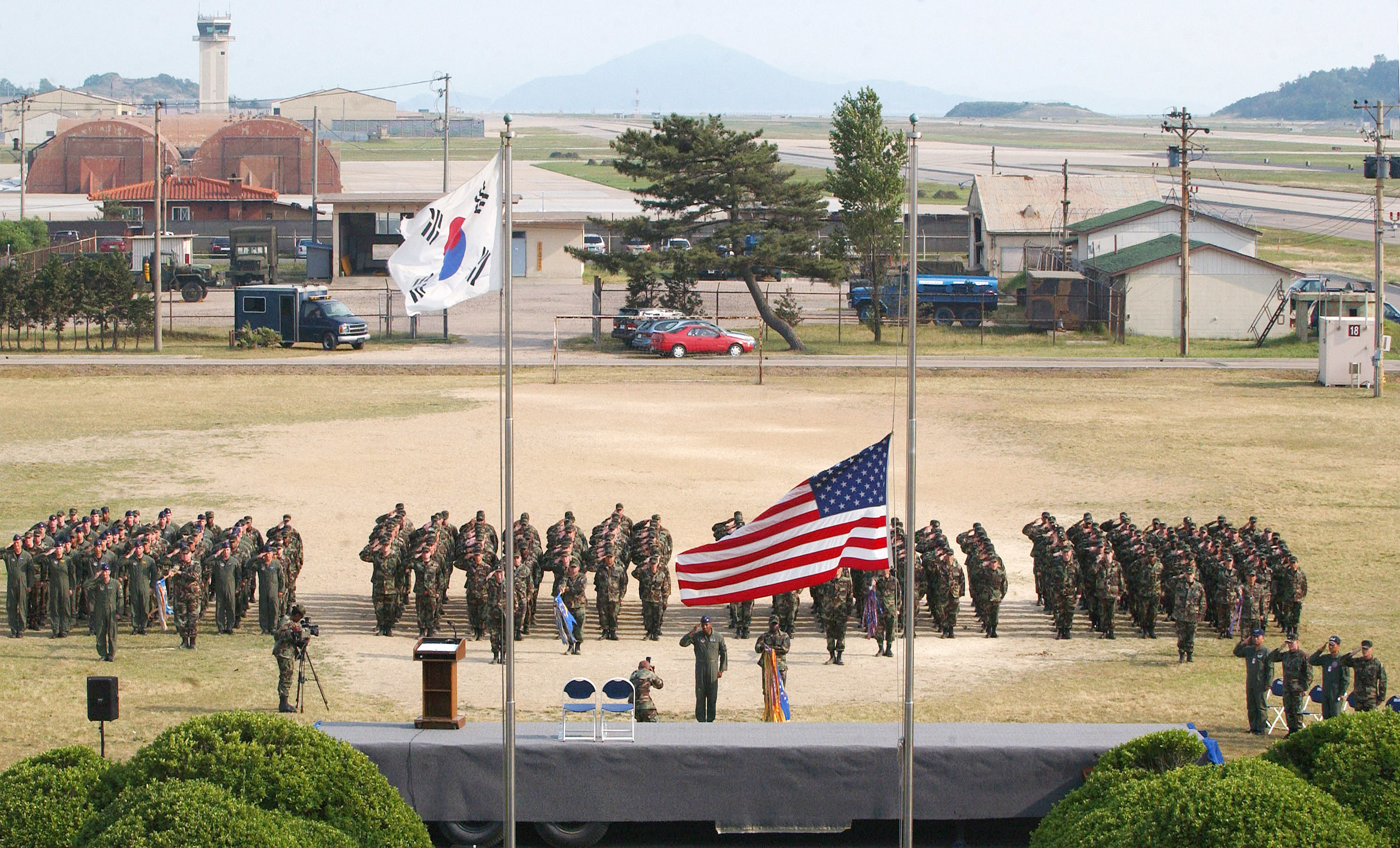
Commemoration event by the 8th Fighter Wing at Kunsan Air Base June 19, 2007, to honor the memory of Olds

== Death ==
In March 2007 Olds was hospitalized in Colorado for complications of Stage 4 prostate cancer. On the evening of June 14, 2007 he died from congestive heart failure in Steamboat Springs, Colorado, a month before his 85th birthday. He was honored with a flyover and services at the United States Air Force Academy, where his ashes are housed, on June 30, 2007.

Olds is remembered as the Class Exemplar of the Academy Class of 2011, which had begun Basic Cadet Training, the first step towards becoming Air Force officers, two days before Olds' funeral.
