= Operation Bolo =

Part of the Vietnam War (1967)

- Part of Vietnam War
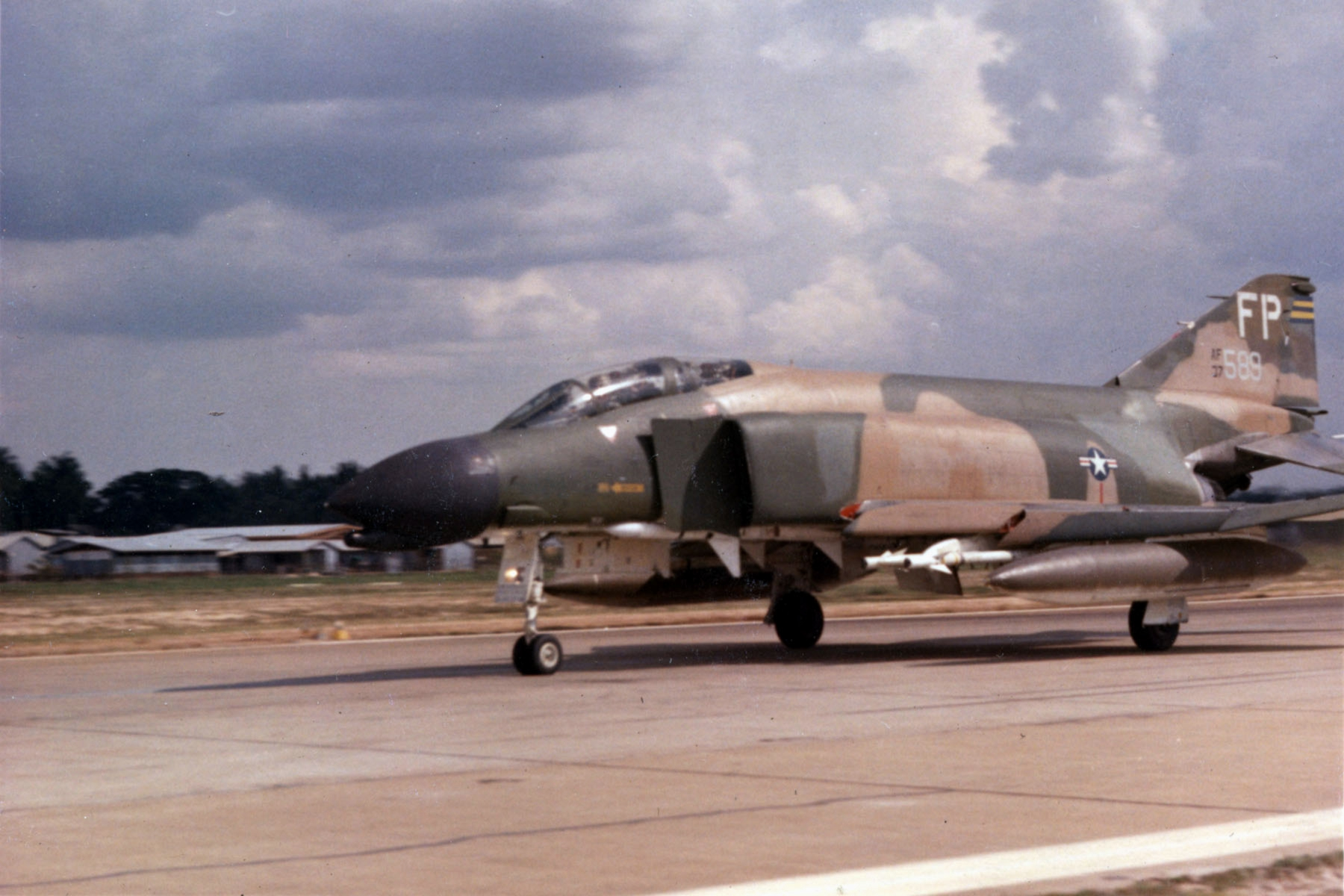
- 8th TFW F-4C Phantom II, c. 1967
Date	2 January 1967; 59 years ago
Location	North Vietnam
Result	American Victory

Belligerents
United States Air Force	Vietnam People's Air Force

Commanders and leaders
Robin Olds; Daniel James, Jr.	Tran Manh

Strength
56 F-4C Phantom IIs (28 participated)	16 MiG-21 'Fishbeds' (8 or 9 engaged)

Casualties and losses
None	US claim: 7 MiG-21s confirmed destroyed VPAF claim: 5 MiG-21PFL lost (c/n 1812, 1908, 1909, 2106, 2206)

Operation Bolo was a United States Air Force mission during the Vietnam War, considered to be a successful combat ruse.

The mission was a response to the heavy losses sustained during the Operation Rolling Thunder aerial-bombardment campaign of 1966, during which Vietnam People's Air Force (VPAF) fighter jets had evaded U.S. escort fighters and attacked U.S. bombers flying predictable routes. On 2 January 1967, U.S. Air Force F-4 Phantom II multirole fighters flew a mission along flight paths typically used by the bombers during Rolling Thunder. The ruse drew an attack by Vietnamese Mikoyan-Gurevich MiG-21 interceptors, whose pilots expected to find heavily loaded fighter-bombers. Instead, they came up against the Phantoms, which claimed seven Vietnamese MiG-21s, although Vietnamese records show five being lost.

The battle prompted VPAF pilots and strategists, as well as Soviet tacticians, to re-evaluate the tactics and deployment of the MiG-21.

== Background ==
=== Opposing aircraft ===
The F-4 Phantom II had been in operational service with the United States Air Force since 1964. The latest fighter in American service, the F-4 had powerful engines, excellent handling, and an air-to-air configuration of eight air-to-air missiles. However, the Phantom suffered from a lack of maneuverability, as its original conception as a fleet defense interceptor dictated that air combat would occur at beyond visual range with radar-guided missiles. It also had engines that tended to produce large amounts of smoke, making it highly visible in combat.

The F-4's missile armament consisted of the AIM-7 Sparrow and the AIM-9 Sidewinder. Although the short-range AIM-9 was thought to be an effective weapon, the use of the beyond visual range AIM-7 was constrained by Rules of Engagement which in most cases required visual confirmation of a target before firing – essentially defeating any advantage that the missile would have conferred to the American pilots. Both missiles had exhibited reliability problems in combat in 1966, exacerbated by maintenance problems caused by the tropical conditions of Southeast Asia, with the majority failing to ignite, fuse, or guide to the target.

The F-4's primary adversary during this engagement was the Soviet-built Mikoyan-Gurevich MiG-21, NATO reporting name 'Fishbed', a small fighter designed as a short-range interceptor, a role that perfectly suited its use by the VPAF. Armed with two Vympel K-13 missiles (known to US pilots by their NATO designation "Atoll"), the MiG-21 had rapid acceleration, was agile at supersonic speeds and at high altitudes, and significantly outperformed its primary target – the F-105 Thunderchief – in all flight regimes.

A small, light fighter, its low wing loadings were excellent for air combat maneuvering and its small size made it difficult to spot even when its adversary was warned of its presence. Typically, the MiG-21 was used in hit-and-run tactics; being vectored by Ground Control Intercept (GCI) to an intercept position to the vulnerable rear of an American strike formation, then executing a missile attack and diving away before fighter cover could intervene. Scoring its first kill on 5 October 1966, in December intercepting MiG-21s shot down two F-105s and forced 20% of all strike sorties to jettison their bombloads.

=== The MiG threat ===
The agility of the MiG-21 and the VPAF tactic of high-speed slashing attacks from astern under GCI control posed a challenge to American pilots, who had become predictable by staging large formation strikes from Thailand flying roughly the same routes and times of day allowing the VPAF to challenge them with a relatively small force of 15 or 16 MiG-21 fighters used as point defense interceptors.

The USAF pilots were constrained by their rules of engagement and thwarted by an adversary that engaged only when the situation was ideal. If the MiG-21 was a threat to the Phantoms, it was a bigger threat to its main target, the comparatively sluggish, bomb-laden F-105 fighter-bombers that carried out most of the attacks and bombing missions in the North Vietnamese interior during Operation Rolling Thunder.

"Operation Bolo" was created to deal with the new MiG threat. Since October the F-105s had been equipped with QRC-160 radar jamming pods that had virtually ended their own losses to surface-to-air missiles, but had shifted SAM attacks to the Phantoms, unprotected because of a shortage of the pods. Rules of engagement that had previously permitted the F-4 MiGCAP to escort the F-105s in and out of the target area had been revised in December to limit MiGCAP penetration to the edge of SAM coverage.

MiG interceptions had consequently increased, primarily due to MiG-21s using high-speed hit-and-run tactics against bomb-laden F-105 formations, and although only two bombers had been lost, the threat to the force was perceived as serious. Bombing of North Vietnamese airfields was still forbidden at the start of 1967, and 8th TFW wing commander Colonel Robin Olds proposed an aerial ambush as the best means of mitigating the threat.

=== Robin Olds ===
Colonel Robin Olds was the commander of the 8th Tactical Fighter Wing and an experienced fighter pilot who had become a double ace in two tours over Europe during World War II. He was sent to Southeast Asia to revive the performance of the 8th TFW and he did so from the cockpit. Five days after he arrived at Ubon, the 8th TFW lost an F-4C to an air-to-air missile shot from a MiG-21, the first such loss in the war. This followed two other F-4 losses to MiGs in the two weeks before Olds took command. Olds was upset, but was also convinced that his pilots could take on the MiG-21 and prevail if the MiGs could be drawn into the air on even terms. His idea for Operation Bolo was relatively simple: Make the agile Phantom II look like the cumbersome bomb-laden F-105 and lure the MiGs into a sustained dogfight that depleted the MiG-21s of their relatively small fuel load and flight time.

=== Planning Operation Bolo ===
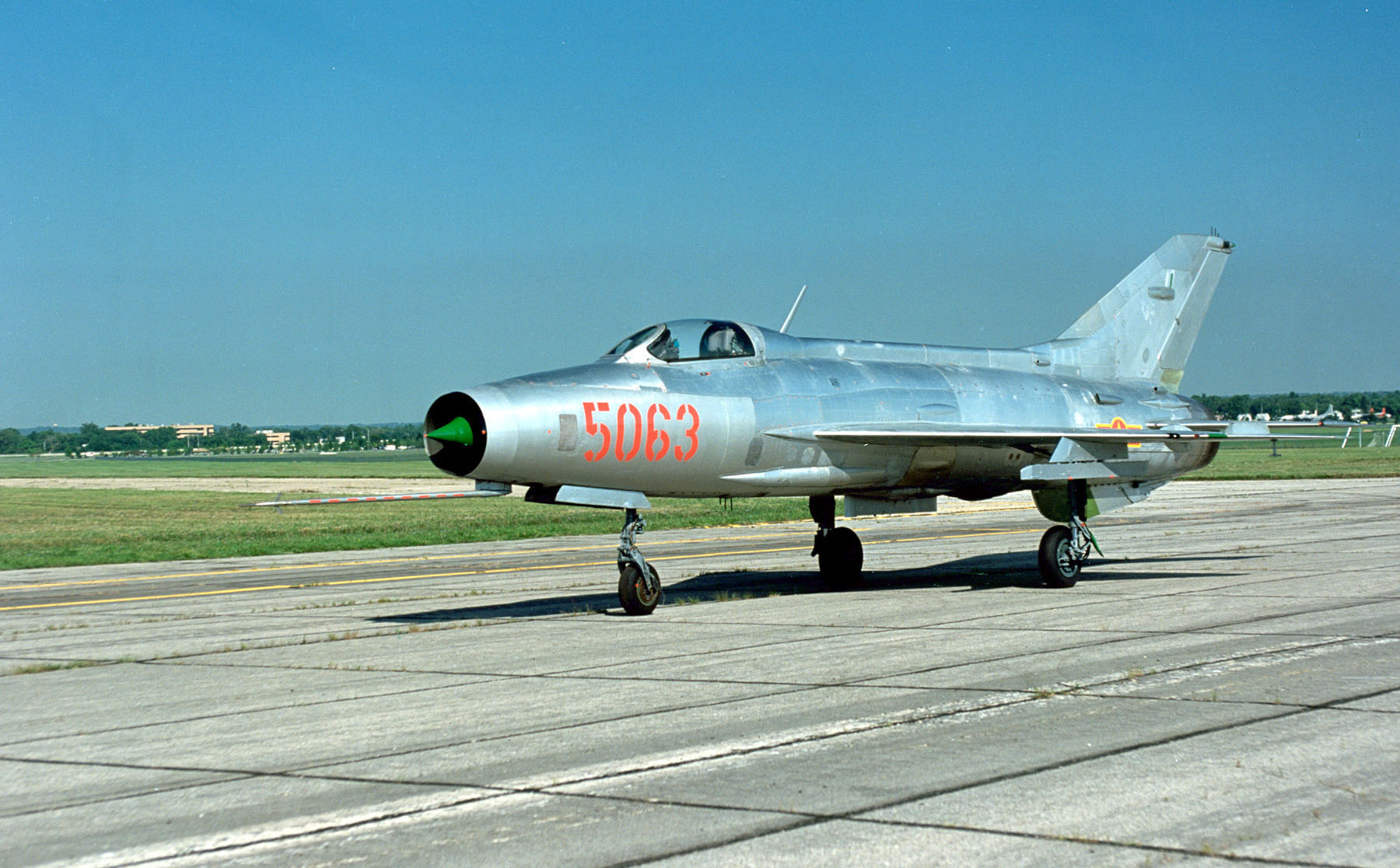
A VPAF's MiG-21 'Fishbed'.

Olds assigned the planning of Operation Bolo to a quartet of veteran junior officers in his wing: the wing tactics officer Captain John B. Stone, 1st Lieutenant Joseph Hicks, 1st Lieutenant Ralph F. Wetterhahn, and Major James D. Covington. Working under the tightest security, the pilots assigned to fly the mission would not be briefed until 30 December.

The group planned for a coordinated mission by a "west force" of seven flights of F-4Cs from the 8th TFW at Ubon and an "east force" of seven flights of F-4Cs from the 366th Tactical Fighter Wing based at Da Nang Air Base, South Vietnam. The west force would simulate the F-105 strike force while the east force would cover alternate airfields and provide a barrier against MiGs attempting to flee to China. The task force also included 6 flights of F-105s for protection from SAMs, airborne radar support by College Eye EC-121 aircraft, and radar jamming support by EB-66s, escorted by four flights of F-104s of the 435th TFS at Ubon.

The planners determined that if the MiGs reacted, their fuel endurance from takeoff to landing would extend to a maximum of 55 minutes. Arrival times of the F-4 flights over the targeted airfields were set five minutes apart to ensure continuous coverage and maximum opportunities for engagement in the target area, and to attempt to run surviving MiGs out of fuel by preventing them from landing. The mission was also planned so that no other US aircraft would be present, allowing the first three flights of F-4s "missile-free" engagement without having to first identify the target as required by Seventh Air Force rules of engagement.

Everything hinged on getting the MiGs airborne; if they didn't take the bait, then the plan would not come to fruition. In order to deceive the North Vietnamese, the west force had to fly the same ingress routes, altitudes, and speeds as the F-105, use the same air refueling tanker tracks and altitudes, and use F-105 jargon in voice communications. (However, to Olds's dismay, the flights were still assigned callsigns of MiGCAPs throughout the war, which were the names of American-made automobiles: Olds, Ford, Rambler, Lincoln, Tempest, Plymouth, and Vespa.)

The F-4s were fitted out with the QRC-160 jamming pods normally carried only by F-105s, so that their electronic signature would be the same, and the F-4s would also fly the inflexible line-abreast pod formations used by the F-105s to maximize pod effectiveness. The pods had to be mounted on one of the fuel tank wing pylons, forcing the F-4s to carry a centerline and single wing tank, creating an asymmetric imbalance that made takeoffs difficult (the aircraft would try to roll on liftoff to the side carrying the wing tank).

The operation plan was presented to General William Momyer, commanding the Seventh Air Force, on 22 December 1966. Momyer approved the plan, which was assigned the code name "Bolo", after the cane-cutting machete which doubled as a Filipino martial arts weapon. Sharp and deadly, the Filipino bolo does not appear to be a weapon until the opponent is drawn in too close to evade. This was the intent of the plan — to draw the MiGs into the Phantoms' killing zone and strike while the North Vietnamese were still expecting to find the less-dangerous F-105s.

Olds also charged his maintenance crews with inspecting, cleaning, and repairing all equipment on the aircraft assigned to the mission, a task that took several days. As soon as the F-4s were equipped with the QRC-160 Electronic Countermeasures Pods, the date of the attack was set for 1 January 1967.

== Executing the mission ==
The mission was delayed because of bad weather and rescheduled for 2 January. The mission launched from Ubon that afternoon after another hour's delay, and Olds, leading the first flight, arrived over Phúc Yên Air Base at 15:00 local time. Flying southeast on the ingress route used by F-105s, the mission drew no defensive reaction, and Olds found that a floor of thick clouds blanketed the area below, concealing any view of MiGs taking off.

Unknown to Olds, the North Vietnamese GCI controllers had delayed takeoffs by approximately 15 minutes because of the overcast. He reversed course and flew to the northwest. When three minutes had passed without contact, and with Ford flight almost in the area, he canceled the missile-free option. Just as Ford flight arrived in the target area, the first MiGs emerged from the clouds below.

=== Olds flight ===
The first attack came as the second flight of F-4s was also entering the area. Olds' flight immediately dropped fuel tanks and lit afterburners to engage three MiGs that, although apparently emerging at random, actually had been directed to have the first appear at the flight's "six" (rear) and the next two moments later at its "ten" (left front), presenting one MiG with a tail-shooting solution and tactical surprise. All three flights that engaged MiGs later reported encountering this tactic.

Olds 02, flown by mission planner Ralph Wetterhahn, scored the first kill by shooting the MiG with an AIM-7 Sparrow as Olds 01, flown by Olds, fired three missiles that failed either to launch or guide. Olds stated:

The battle started when the MiGs began to get out of the cloud cover. Unfortunately for me, the first one appeared in my 'six o'clock'. I think it was more an accident than a planned tactic. As a matter of fact, in the next few minutes many other MiGs started to exit from the clouds from different positions.

I was lucky. The flight behind me saw the MiGs and tried to divert its attention. I broke to the left, sharply enough to get away of his line of fire, hoping that my wingman would take care of him. Meanwhile another MiG came out of the clouds, turning widely about my '11 o'clock' at a distance of 2,000 yards. He went into the clouds again and I tried to follow.

A third enemy plane appeared in my '10 o'clock', from the right to the left: in simple words, almost in the opposite direction. The first MiG zoomed away and I engaged the afterburner to get in an attack position against this new enemy. I reared up my aircraft in a 45 degree angle, inside his turn. He was turning to the left, so I pulled the stick and barrel-rolled to the right. Thanks to this maneuver, I found myself above him, half upside down. I held it until the MiG finished his turn, calculating the time so that, if I could keep on turning behind him, I would get on his tail, with a deflection angle of 20 degrees, at a distance of 1,500 yards. That was exactly what happened. He never saw me. Behind and lower than him, I could clearly see his silhouette against the sun when I launched two Sidewinders. One of them impacted and tore apart his right wing.

The vertical maneuver, known as a "vector roll," positioned his Phantom above the tighter-turning MiG-21, then when it completed its turn, Olds dropped in behind it and fired two AIM-9s. One struck the MiG's right wing and tore it off. The MiG went into a spiral and disappeared into the clouds below, the second kill of the battle. At nearly the same time, Olds 04, flown by Captain Walter S. Radeker III, spotted a MiG tracking his element lead and maneuvered to engage it. Radeker was unable to get a consistently good tone (which would indicate missile lock), but launched. His Sidewinder guided perfectly, however, and struck the MiG just in front of its tail, sending it into a spin. Olds flight had destroyed three MiG-21s without suffering a loss and at its fuel consumption limits left the area.

=== Ford flight ===
Ford flight, led by 8th TFW Vice Commander Colonel Daniel "Chappie" James, Jr. entered the target area at 15:05, just as the MiGs began to engage, and James radioed a warning to Olds. Though he did not score a victory himself, James witnessed the victory made by his wingman, Captain Everett T. Raspberry:

At 15:04 my flight was attacked by three MiGs, two from the '10 o'clock' and one from the '6 o'clock'. Initially I didn't see this last one because I had been concentrating on those approaching head-on. My WSO excitedly warned me about this rapidly approaching MiG, which was within firing range of my #3 and #4. I hesitated a while before interrupting my attack against the two MiGs in front, because I had seen the 'Olds' flight passing below us a few seconds before. I thought that the plane seen by my WSO could be one of them. Despite that, I suddenly turned left and then right, and caught sight of the third MiG. I ordered to my numbers 3 and 4 to break right. As they did so, the MiG broke left for some mysterious reason and for a split second we were side by side. We were so close that, besides the red stars in his wings, I could clearly see the pilot's face. I began a horizontal barrel roll to get away from him and into an attack position, once in position, I launched a Sidewinder. The missile missed because the evading MiG broke left at full throttle. But when he did it, he put himself in the line of fire of my number 2, Captain Everett T. Raspberry. I ordered him to follow the prey, because the two aircraft that I initially saw had been placed in my forward sector. I was in an advantageous position, so I fired two AIM-9s against them in a quick sequence, and I turned to place myself as wingman of my #2, Captain Raspberry. [...] I kept on descending besides Captain Raspberry and I remember that I thought that he was still out of the optimal launching envelope. But he performed a barrel roll that placed him in a perfect position again and he launched an AIM-9 which hit against the tail section of the MiG-21. It was shaken violently and later fell in a slow, almost plane spin.

James, preoccupied with two MiGs approaching Ford flight head-on, was attacked from the rear by a MiG-21. He executed a horizontal barrel roll, got behind his attacker, and fired an AIM-9 that the MiG evaded. However, the maneuver placed the MiG in front of Raspberry, who shot it down with a missile hit behind the cockpit. After Ford 02 scored its kill, Ford flight left the scene without loss, its success due partially to the high-speed maneuverability of the F-4 at 17,000 ft (5,200 m).

=== Rambler flight ===
Rambler flight, the third into the area, was led by Captain John B. Stone, the wing tactics officer and one of the architects of Operation Bolo. When Rambler entered the engagement, Stone spotted a pair of MiGs popping up through a break in the clouds, dove and launched an AIM-7 Sparrow, which failed to ignite. Stone fired again a second Sparrow that successfully guided to one of the MiGs. Observing a third MiG behind him, he coordinated his maneuvers with his wingman and steered the MiG into the line of fire of Major Philip P. Combies (Rambler 04). He saw the battle in this way:

We flew at 13,440 feet (4,100 meters) above sea level and our speed was 540 knots [1,000 km/h]. A little bit after completing a turn to the northwest, we identified a patrol of four MiG-21s in spread formation at a distance of 5 miles –about 8 km- at '2 o'clock' and below us. Two more MiGs appeared 2 miles –about 3 km - behind... When the MiGs crossed in front of Stone, he started to follow, breaking left and losing height. Due to that, the flight spread wide to the right, and I found myself higher and somewhat to the right of the others. I kept the throttle to the minimum during the first phase of the combat. So, when the MiGs broke to the left, and the engagement began. I chose one of the MiGs and followed him with my radar. I don't think that we ever exceeded 4G's during the whole engagement. I decided to follow the Navy pilots' tactics - at close range foregoing the radar tracking, but looking through the reticle instead. When I realized that I was in the right position, I pushed the fire button, released it, pushed it again, and waited. I did not even see the first Sparrow. However, I followed the entire trajectory of the second one, from launch to impact. I fired the missiles at less than 2,000 yards from the MiG's tail, at a height of 9,800 feet (3,000 meters) while turning to the left. The second one hit the tail section of the enemy aircraft. A second later, I saw a huge, orange ball of fire.

Seconds later, another MiG-21 crossed in front of Rambler 02 and was apparently destroyed by a Sparrow fired by its pilot, Lawrence Glynn. The MiG, hit behind the tailfin, exploded in a fireball. This, the third MiG-21 downed by Rambler flight, raised the final score of the day to 7:0 in favor of the F-4s. SA-2 missile launches (five in all) began to threaten Rambler flight, which also disengaged. The entire combat lasted twelve minutes.

The final four flights of 8th TFW aircraft arrived to find the engagement over and departed the area because of the SAM threat, while the Da Nang-based East Force assessed the weather conditions and did not penetrate North Vietnamese airspace. Two of the Ubon-based West Force had aborted the mission for maintenance problems, and ultimately only 26 of the 56 assigned fighters entered the target area, and only 12 of those engaged.

== Bolo summary ==
The following table summarizes the 8th TFW's seven MiG-21 victories:

Squadron	Call Sign	Aircraft Commander^{1}	Pilot^{1}	Missile
555 TFS	Olds 02	1st Lt. Ralph F. Wetterhahn	1st Lt. Jerry K. Sharp	AIM-7
555 TFS	Olds 04	Capt. Walter S. Radeker III	1st Lt. James E. Murray III	AIM-9
555 TFS	Olds 01	Col. Robin Olds	1st Lt. Charles C. Clifton	AIM-9
555 TFS	Ford 02	Capt. Everett T. Raspberry, Jr.	1st Lt. Robert W. Western	AIM-9
433 TFS	Rambler 04	Maj. Philip P. Combies	1st Lt. Lee R. Dutton	AIM-7
433 TFS	Rambler 01	Capt. John B. Stone	1st Lt. Clifton P. Dunnegan, Jr.	AIM-7
433 TFS	Rambler 02	1st Lt. Lawrence J. Glynn, Jr.	1st Lt. Lawrence E. Cary	AIM-7

^{1}In 1967 all USAF F-4s were crewed by two rated pilots, with the more experienced flying the front seat as "aircraft commander". The use of rated navigators as Weapon Systems Officers began in 1969.

A North Vietnamese source confirms the loss of only five MiG-21 during Operation Bolo and states that all five pilots bailed out safely:

Unit	Pilot Name	Pilot Fate	A/c type	Serial
921 FR	Vũ Ngọc Đỉnh	shot down, ejected safely	MiG-21PFL	4228
921 FR	Nguyễn Đức Thắng	shot down, ejected safely	MiG-21PFL	4125
921 FR	Nguyễn Đăng Kính	shot down, ejected safely	MiG-21PFL	4126
921 FR	Bùi Đức Như	shot down, ejected safely	MiG-21PFL	4224
921 FR	Nguyễn Ngọc Độ	shot down, ejected safely	MiG-21PFL	4029

=== Mission impact and followup ===
As the F-4s landed at Ubon, their ground crews lined the taxiway. As each Phantom passed, cockpits opened, the pilots indicated with upheld fingers the numbers of kills they'd scored. Of the 16 MiG-21s known to be in the VPAF inventory, 11 to 14 had been engaged on that day (depending on the source), with seven destroyed and two others probably shot down (by Combies and Major Herman L. Knapp, Rambler 03). Years later, Vietnamese government sources admitted that Operation Bolo on 2 January was one of the worst days for the VPAF during the war. The VPAF claimed to have lost five MiG-21s, with no enemy kills to claim.

The success of Operation Bolo led Seventh Air Force to plan a similar mission simulating an RF-4C photo reconnaissance mission. The immediate reaction to Bolo by the VPAF was to challenge the daily "recce" mission on the two days immediately following Bolo, in each case causing the mission to be aborted. On both 5 and 6 January, a pair of 555th TFS F-4C Phantoms, flying a close formation to appear as a single target on North Vietnamese radar, flew the high-speed profile. On the second day, intercepted by four MiGs, they again surprised and shot down two during the encounter, with Crab 01 (Captain Richard M. Pascoe and 1st Lieutenant Norman E. Wells) and Crab 02 (Major Thomas M. Hirsch and 1st Lieutenant Roger J. Strasswimmer) each scoring a kill.

For the North Vietnamese (and their Soviet allies who supplied the MiG-21 aircraft and helped set up the integrated air defense network), the two reverses on 2 and 5 January–6 January forced them to disband their assets by grounding the MiGs for four months for retraining and devising of new tactics.

== See also ==
- Operation Rimon 20

== General references ==
- Nordeen, Lon O. (1986). Air Warfare in the Missile Age. Smithsonian Institution Press. ISBN 0-87474-680-9.
