= Lillie Anna James =

Lillie Anna "Mother" James (June 1876 – November 3, 1957) was an American educator who established a school for African American children in Pensacola, Florida. Her son, Daniel James Jr., became the first black full general in U.S. history. She is listed as a Great Floridian.

== Biography ==
She was born as Lillie Anna Brown to William and Hattie (Crenshaw) Brown in June 1876, in Pensacola, where she lived her entire life. On December 23, 1894, she married Daniel James, a native of Alabama. They had 17 children, many of whom died young. Her son Daniel James Jr. would become a U.S. Air Force four star general.

James established the Lillie Anna James Private School for her own children and other black youths in her community; it would become a prestigious middle school and junior high school. Her 11th commandment was: "Thou shalt not quit", a call for her children to prove they could compete on an equal basis. She died in 1957.

Her former home, where she ran the school, is located at 1606 Martin Luther King Boulevard. Pensacola's Memorial Garden includes a marker in her honor.
