= Tuskegee Airmen =

African-American military pilots during World War II

Tuskegee Airmen (unofficial)
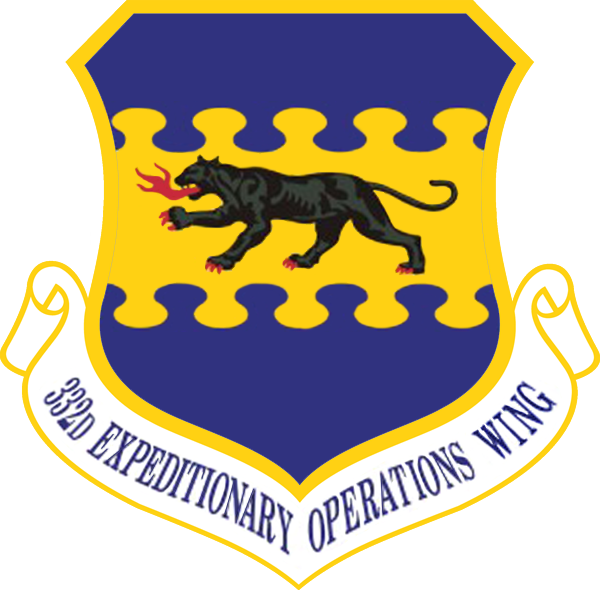
- Emblems of wing
- Active: 1940–1948
- Country: United States
- Branch: United States Army Air Corps; United States Army Air Forces; United States Air Force
- Role: Fighter escort (332nd)/ Bomber (447th)
- Part of: Graduates assigned to the 332nd Fighter Group (99th Fighter Squadron, 100th Fighter Squadron, 301st Fighter Squadron, 302d Fighter Squadron), 477th Medium Bombardment Group (616th Bombardment Squadron, 617th Bombardment Squadron, 618th Bombardment Squadron, 619th Bombardment Squadron)
- Nicknames: Red Tails; Red-Tail Angels
- Motto: Spit Fire
- Engagements: World War II

The Tuskegee Airmen (/tʌsˈkiːɡiː/) were a group of primarily African-American military pilots (fighter and bomber) and airmen who fought in World War II. They formed the 332nd Fighter Group and the 477th Bombardment Group (Medium) of the United States Army Air Forces (USAAF). The name also applies to the navigators, bombardiers, mechanics, instructors, crew chiefs, nurses, cooks, and other support personnel. The Tuskegee Airmen received praise for their excellent combat record earned while protecting American bombers from enemy fighters. The group was awarded three Distinguished Unit Citations.

All black military pilots who trained in the United States trained at Griel Field, Kennedy Field, Moton Field, Shorter Field, and the Tuskegee Army Air Fields. They were educated at the Tuskegee Institute (now Tuskegee University), located near Tuskegee, Alabama. Of the 922 pilots, five were Haitians from the Haitian Air Force and one pilot was from Trinidad. It also included an airman born in the Dominican Republic and one born in Jamaica.

The 99th Pursuit Squadron (later the 99th Fighter Squadron) was the first black flying squadron, and the first to deploy overseas (to North Africa in April 1943, and later to Sicily and other parts of Italy). The 332nd Fighter Group, which originally included the 100th, 301st, and 302nd Fighter Squadrons, was the first black flying group. It deployed to Italy in early 1944. Although the 477th Bombardment Group trained with North American B-25 Mitchell bombers, they never served in combat. In June 1944, the 332nd Fighter Group began flying heavy bomber escort missions, and in July 1944 with the addition of the 99th Fighter Squadron, it had four fighter squadrons.

The 99th Fighter Squadron was initially equipped with Curtiss P-40 Warhawk fighter-bomber aircraft. The 332nd Fighter Group and its 100th, 301st, and 302nd Fighter Squadrons were equipped for initial combat missions with Bell P-39 Airacobras (March 1944), later with Republic P-47 Thunderbolts (June–July 1944), and finally with the aircraft with which they became most commonly associated, the North American P-51 Mustang (July 1944). When the pilots of the 332nd Fighter Group painted the tails of their P-47s red, the nickname "Red Tails" was coined. The red markings that distinguished the Tuskegee Airmen included red bands on the noses of P-51s, as well as a red empennage; the P-51B, C, and D Mustangs flew with similar color schemes, with red propeller spinners, yellow wing bands, and all-red tail surfaces.

The Tuskegee Airmen were the first African-American military aviators in the United States Armed Forces. During World War II, black Americans in many U.S. states were still subject to the Jim Crow laws (Note: U.S. state and local laws enacted between 1876 and 1965 that mandated de jure racial segregation in all public activities were collectively known as the "Jim Crow laws"; the name derivation from a contemporary pejorative for Black Americans.) and the American military was racially segregated, as was much of the federal government. The Tuskegee Airmen were subjected to discrimination, both within and outside of the Army.

== History ==
=== Origins ===
==== Background ====
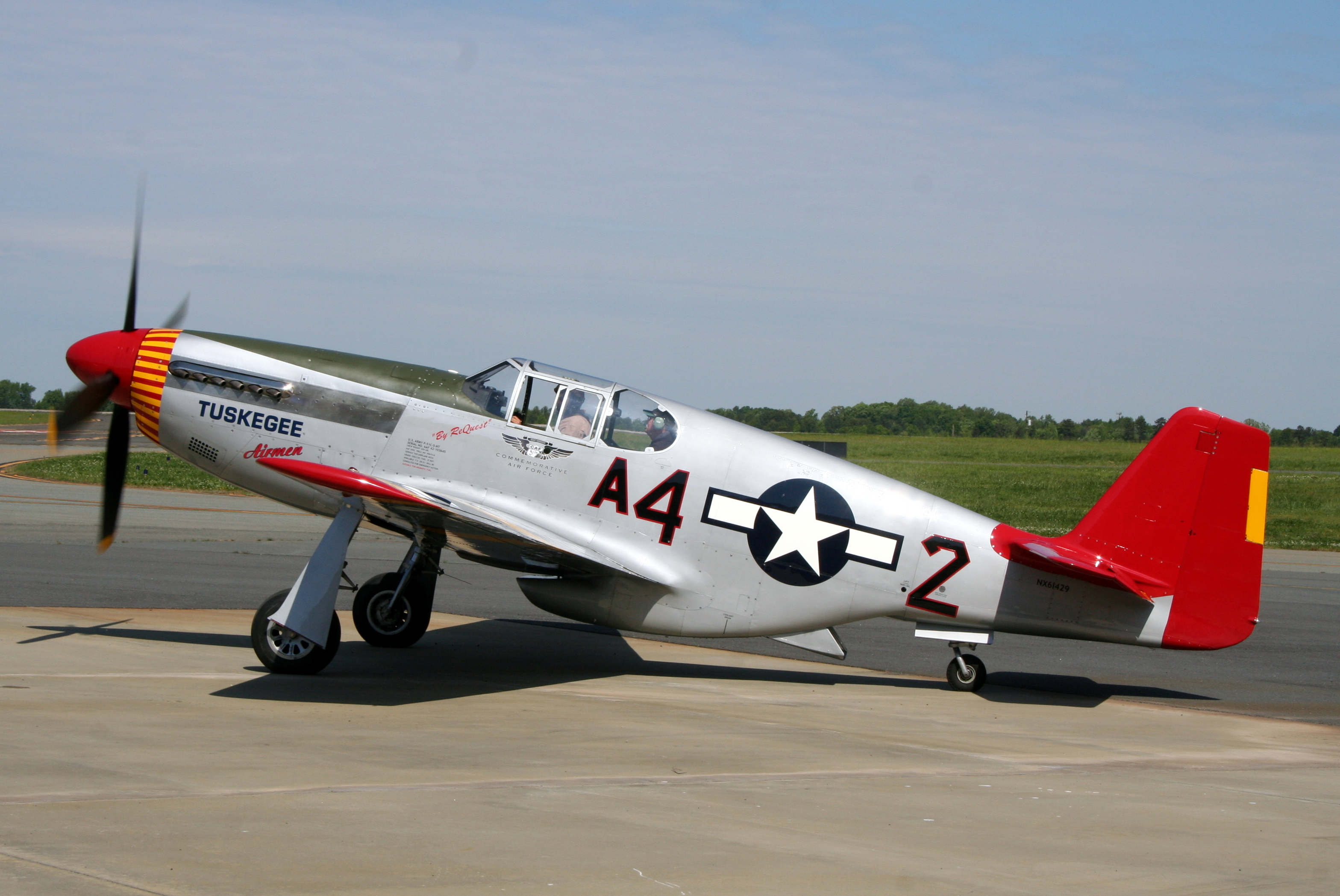
The P-51C Mustang flown by the Commemorative Air Force in the markings of the 302nd Fighter Squadron as a tribute to Lieutenant Colonel Lee Archer.

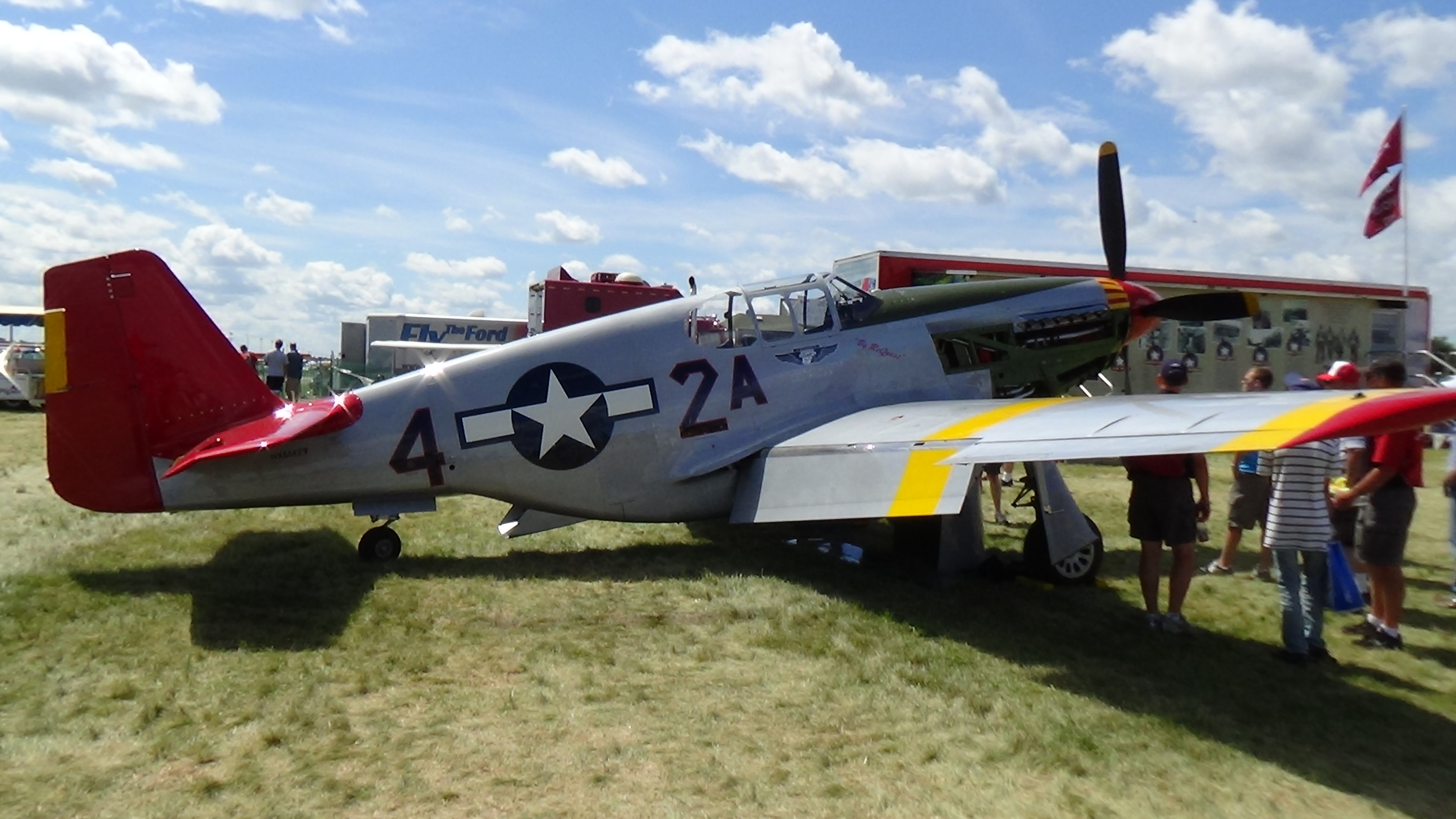
Tuskegee Airman P-51 Mustang taken at EAA AirVenture Oshkosh. This particular P-51C is part of the Red Tail Project

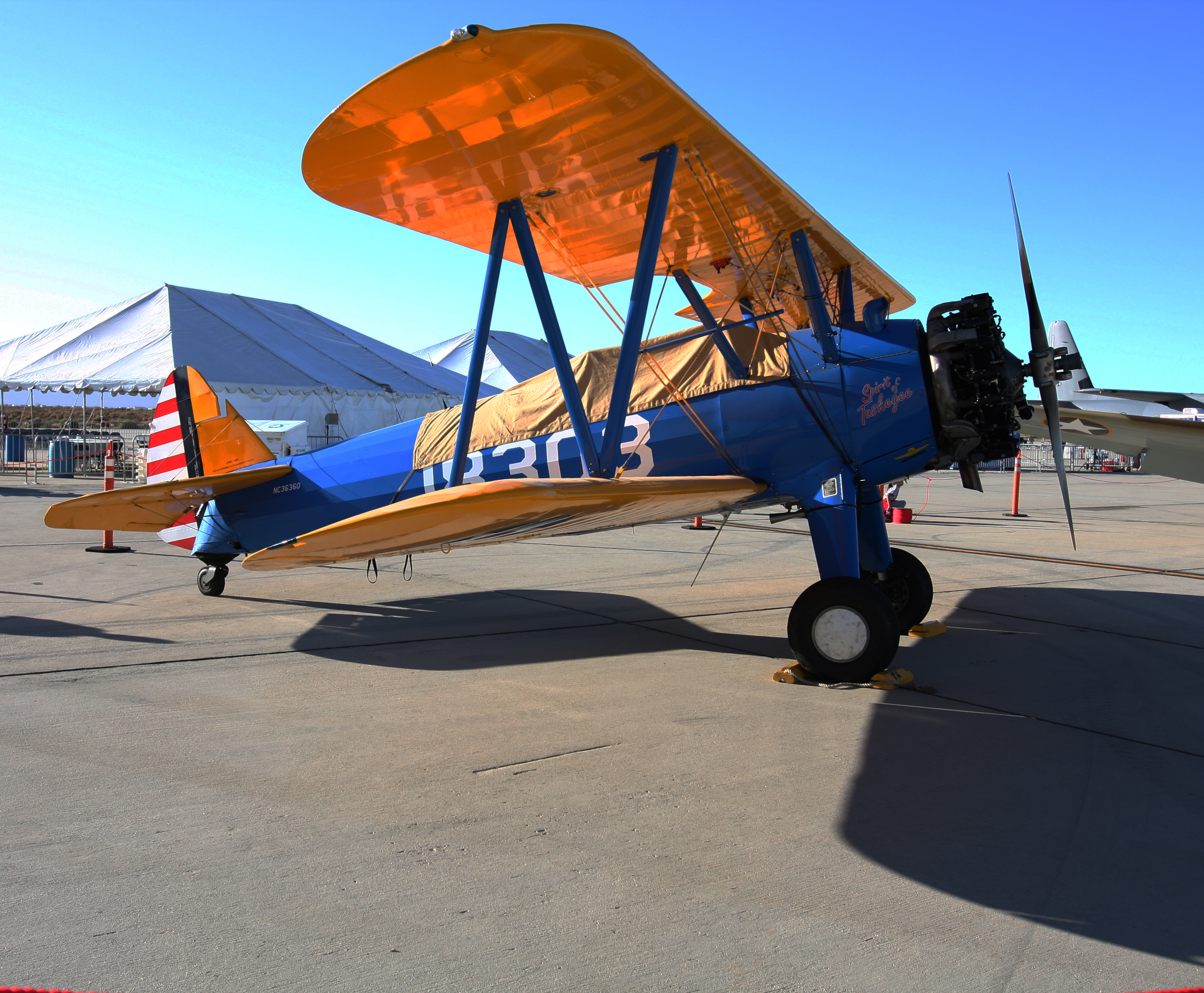
The Stearman Kaydet training aircraft used by the Tuskegee Airmen, bearing the name Spirit of Tuskegee

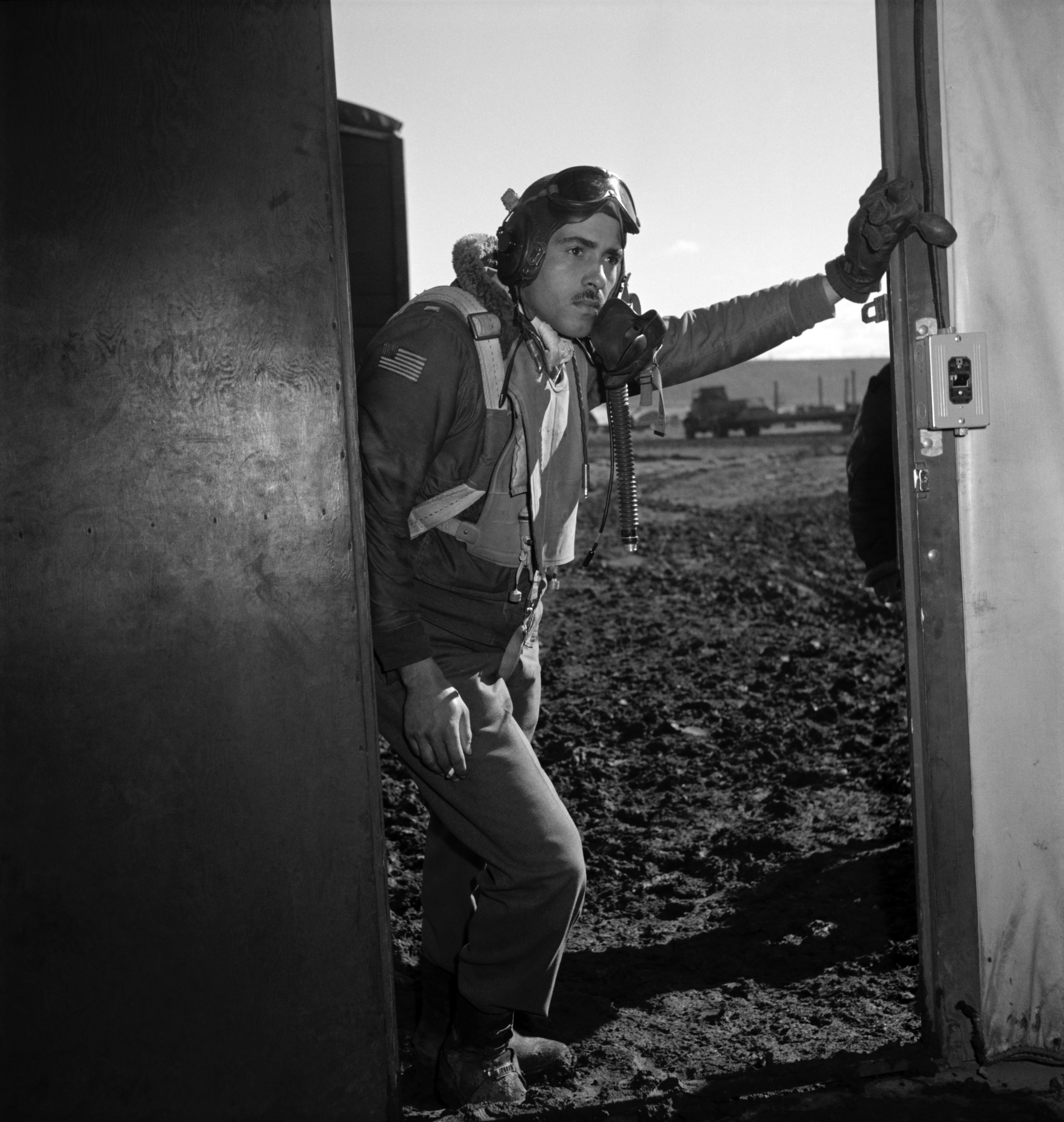
Portrait of Tuskegee airman Edward M. Thomas by photographer Toni Frissell, March 1945

Before the Tuskegee Airmen, no African American had been a U.S. military pilot. In 1917, African-American men had tried to become aerial observers but were rejected. African-American Eugene Bullard served in the French air service during World War I because he was not allowed to serve in an American unit. Bullard returned to infantry duty with the French.

The racially motivated rejections of World War I African-American recruits sparked more than two decades of advocacy by African Americans who wished to enlist and train as military aviators. The effort was led by such prominent civil rights leaders as Walter White of the National Association for the Advancement of Colored People (NAACP), labor union leader A. Philip Randolph, and Judge William H. Hastie. Finally, on 3 April 1939, Appropriations Bill Public Law 18 was passed by Congress containing an amendment by Senator Harry H. Schwartz designating funds for training African-American pilots. The War Department managed to put the money into funds of civilian flight schools that were willing to train black Americans.

War Department tradition and policy mandated the segregation of African Americans into separate military units staffed by white officers, as had been done previously with the 9th Cavalry, 10th Cavalry, 24th Infantry Regiment and 25th Infantry regiments.

When the appropriation of funds for aviation training created opportunities for pilot cadets, their numbers diminished the rosters of these older units. On January 19, 1941, the War Department and the Army Air Corps, under pressure — three months before its transformation into the USAAF — announced the first all-black flying unit, the 99th Pursuit Squadron.Six months later, on July 19, 1941, the first cadet class began pre-flight training.

Because of the restrictive nature of selection policies, the situation did not seem promising for African Americans, since in 1940 the U.S. Census Bureau reported there were only 124 African-American pilots in the nation. The exclusionary policies failed dramatically when the Air Corps received an abundance of applications from men who qualified, even under the restrictive requirements. Many of the applicants had already participated in the Civilian Pilot Training Program, unveiled in late December 1938 (CPTP). Tuskegee University had participated since 1939.

==== Testing ====
The U.S. Army Air Corps had established the Psychological Research Unit 1 at Maxwell Army Air Field, Montgomery, Alabama, and other units around the country for aviation cadet training, which included the identification, selection, education, and training of pilots, navigators and bombardiers. Psychologists employed in these research studies and training programs used some of the first standardized tests to quantify IQ, dexterity, and leadership qualities to select and train the best-suited personnel for the roles of bombardier, navigator, and pilot. The Air Corps determined that the existing programs would be used for all units, including all-black units. At Tuskegee, this effort continued with the selection and training of the Tuskegee Airmen. The War Department set up a system to accept only those with a level of flight experience or higher education which ensured that only the ablest and most intelligent African-American applicants were able to join.

Airman Coleman Young (Second Lieutenant), later the first African-American mayor of Detroit, told journalist Studs Terkel about the process:

They made the standards so high, we actually became an elite group. We were screened and super-screened. We were unquestionably the brightest and most physically fit young blacks in the country. We were super-better because of the irrational laws of Jim Crow. You can't bring that many intelligent young people together and train 'em as fighting men and expect them to supinely roll over when you try to fuck over 'em, right? (Laughs.)

==== First Lady's flight ====
The budding flight program at Tuskegee received a publicity boost when First Lady Eleanor Roosevelt inspected it on 29 March 1941, and flew with African-American chief civilian instructor C. Alfred "Chief" Anderson. Anderson, who had been flying since 1929 and was responsible for training thousands of rookie pilots, took his prestigious passenger on a half-hour flight in a Piper J-3 Cub. After landing, she cheerfully announced: "Well, you can fly all right."

The subsequent brouhaha over the First Lady's flight had such an impact it is often mistakenly cited as the start of the CPTP at Tuskegee, even though the program was already five months old. Eleanor Roosevelt used her position as a trustee of the Julius Rosenwald Fund to arrange a loan of $175,000 to help finance the building of Moton Field.

=== Formation ===
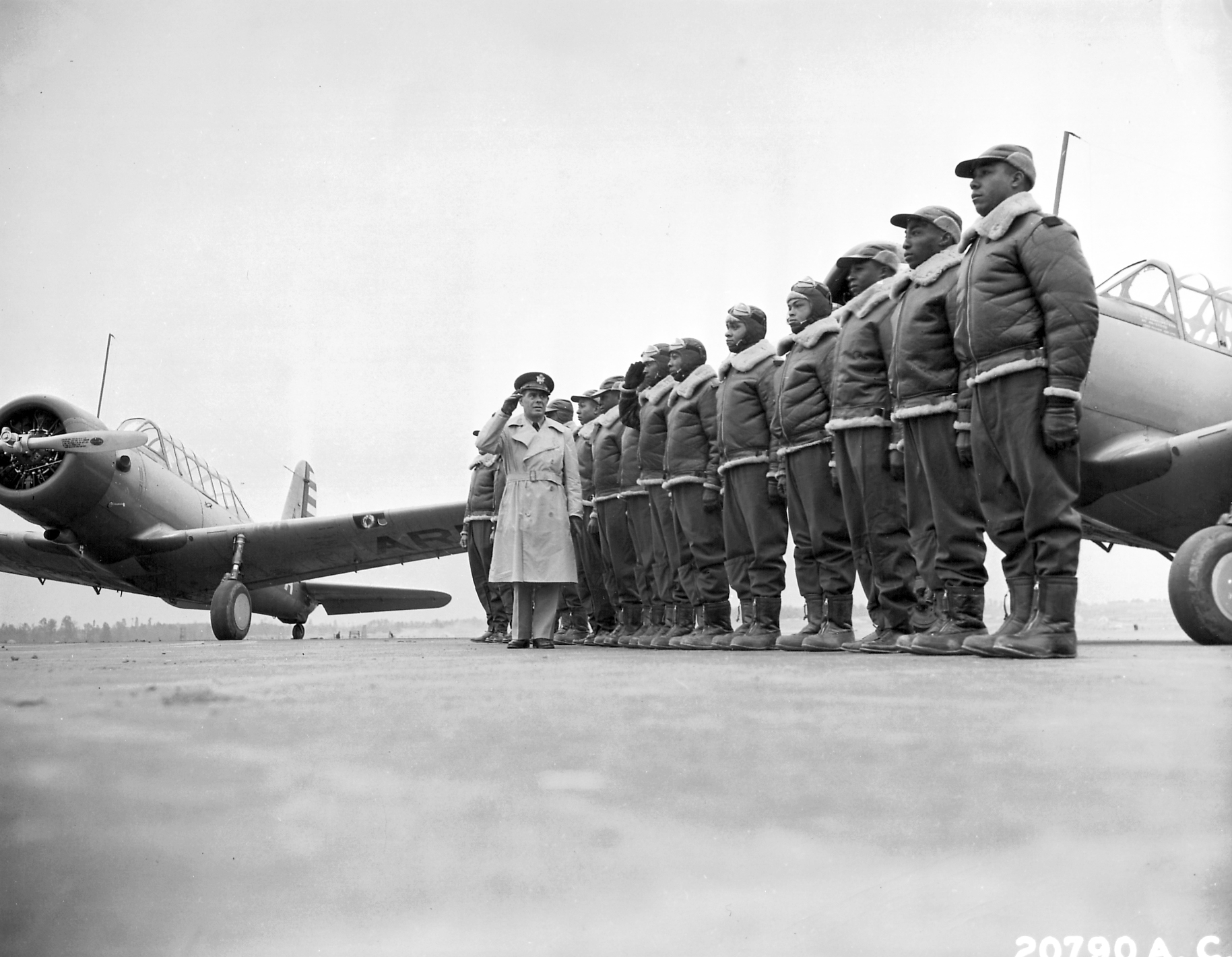
Major James A. Ellison returns the salute of Mac Ross, as he reviews the first class of Tuskegee cadets; flight line at U.S. Army Air Corps basic and advanced flying school, with Vultee BT-13 trainers in the background, Tuskegee, Alabama, 1941

On 22 March 1941, the 99th Pursuit Squadron (Note: "Pursuit" being the U.S. term for "fighter" to May 1942.) was activated without pilots at Chanute Field in Rantoul, Illinois. (Note: It may have been a lawsuit from a rejected candidate, that caused the USAAC to accept black applicants. Yancey Williams, an African American otherwise qualified for military pilot's training, filed suit in the District Court in Washington, DC for admittance to training. He was backed by the National Association for the Advancement of Colored People.)

A cadre of 14 black non-commissioned officers from the 24th and 25th Infantry Regiments were sent to Chanute Field to help in the administration and supervision of the trainees. A white officer, Army Captain Harold R. Maddux, was assigned as the first commander of the 99th Fighter Squadron.

A group of 271 enlisted men began training in aircraft ground support trades at Chanute Field in March 1941 until they were transferred to bases in Alabama in July 1941. The skills being taught were so technical that setting up segregated classes was deemed impossible. This small number of enlisted men became the core of other black squadrons forming at Tuskegee Fields in Alabama.

While the enlisted men were in training, five black youths were admitted to the Officers Training School (OTS) at Chanute Field as aviation cadets. Specifically, Elmer D. Jones, Dudley Stevenson, and James Johnson of Washington, DC; Nelson Brooks of Illinois, and William R. Thompson of Pittsburgh, PA successfully completed OTS and were commissioned as the first Black Army Air Corps Officers.

In June 1941, the 99th Pursuit Squadron was transferred to Tuskegee, Alabama, and remained the only black flying unit in the country, but did not yet have pilots. The famous airmen were actually trained at five airfields surrounding Tuskegee University (formerly Tuskegee Institute)--Griel, Kennedy, Moton, Shorter, and Tuskegee Army Air Fields. The flying unit consisted of 47 officers and 429 enlisted men and was backed by an entire service arm. On 19 July 1941, thirteen individuals made up the first class of aviation cadets (42-C) when they entered preflight training at Tuskegee Institute. After primary training at Moton Field, they were moved to the nearby Tuskegee Army Air Field, about 10 miles (16 km) to the west for conversion training onto operational types. Consequently, Tuskegee Army Air Field became the only Army installation performing three phases of pilot training (basic, advanced, and transition) at a single location. Initial planning called for 500 personnel in residence at a time.

By mid-1942, more than six times that many were stationed at Tuskegee, even though only two squadrons were training there.

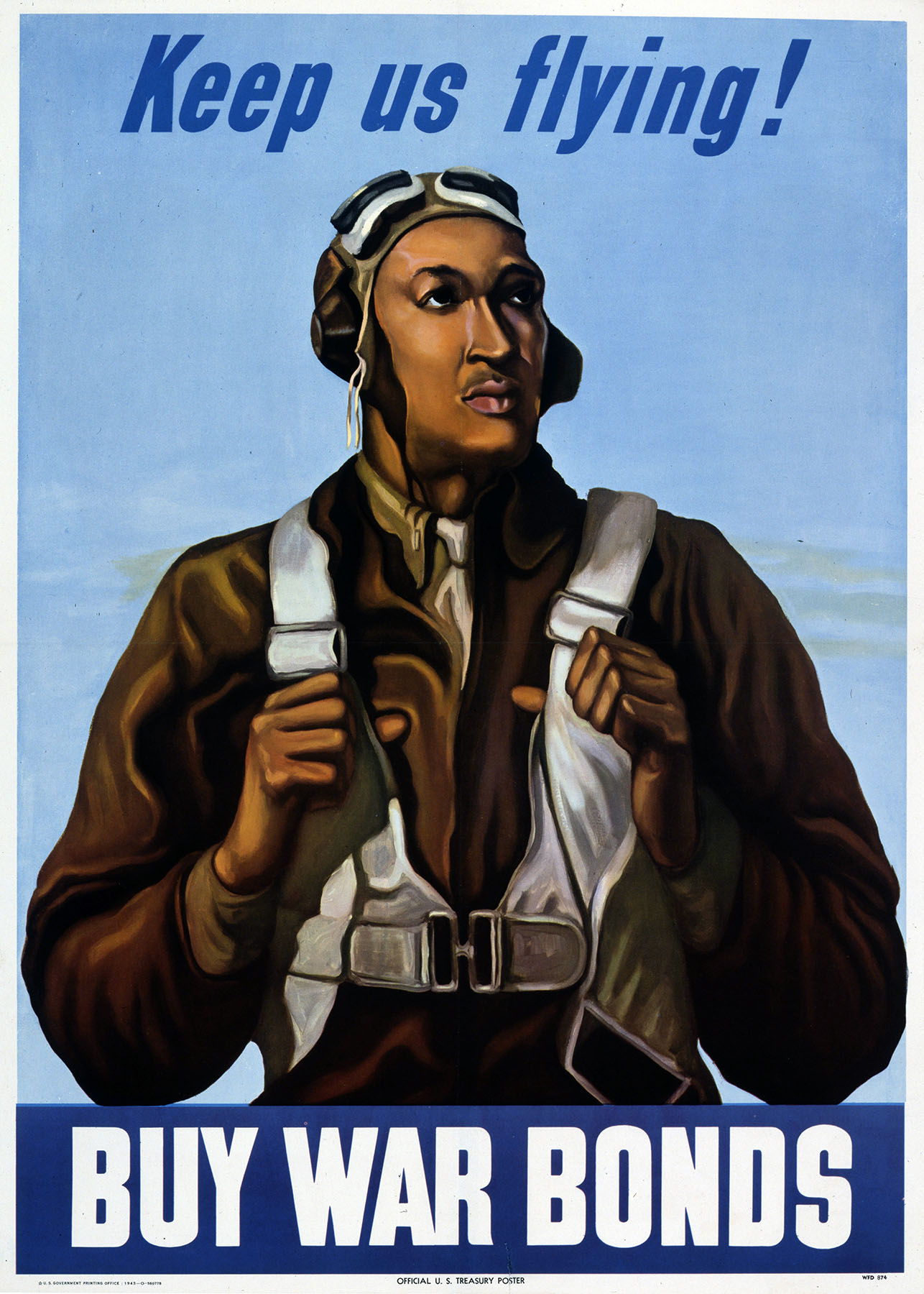
War Bonds poster featuring a Tuskegee Airman

Tuskegee Army Airfield was similar to already-existing airfields reserved for training white pilots, such as Maxwell Field, only 40 miles (64 km) distant. African-American contractor McKissack and McKissack, Inc. was in charge of the contract. The company's 2,000 workmen, the Alabama Works Progress Administration, and the U.S. Army built the airfield in only six months. The construction was budgeted at $1,663,057. The airmen were placed under the command of Captain Benjamin O. Davis Jr., one of only two black line officers then serving.

During training, Tuskegee Army Air Field was commanded first by Major James Ellison. Ellison made great progress in organizing the construction of the facilities needed for the military program at Tuskegee. However, he was transferred on 12 January 1942, reputedly because of his insistence that his African-American sentries and Military Police had police authority over local white civilians.

His successor, Colonel Frederick Kimble, then oversaw operations at the Tuskegee airfield. Contrary to new Army regulations, Kimble maintained segregation on the field in deference to local customs in the state of Alabama, a policy that was resented by the airmen. Later that year, the Air Corps replaced Kimble. His replacement had been the director of training at Tuskegee Army Airfield, Major Noel F. Parrish. Counter to the prevalent racism of the day, Parrish was fair and open-minded and petitioned Washington to allow the Tuskegee Airmen to serve in combat.

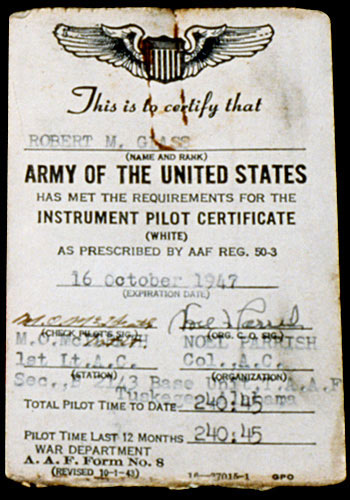
Instrument certificate for Tuskegee Airman Robert M. Glass, signed by Parrish

The strict racial segregation the U.S. Army required gave way in the face of the requirements for complex training in technical vocations. Typical of the process was the development of separate African-American flight surgeons to support the operations and training of the Tuskegee Airmen. Before the development of this unit, no U.S. Army flight surgeons had been black.

Training of African-American men as aviation medical examiners was conducted through correspondence courses, until 1943, when two black physicians were admitted to the U.S. Army School of Aviation Medicine at Randolph Field, Texas. This was one of the earliest racially integrated courses in the U.S. Army. Seventeen flight surgeons served with the Tuskegee Airmen from 1941 to 1949. At that time, the typical tour of duty for a U.S. Army flight surgeon was four years. Six of these physicians lived under field conditions during operations in North Africa, Sicily, and other parts of Italy. The chief flight surgeon to the Tuskegee Airmen was Vance H. Marchbanks Jr., MD, a childhood friend of Benjamin Davis.

The accumulation of washed-out cadets at Tuskegee and the propensity of other commands to "dump" African-American personnel on the post exacerbated the difficulties of administering Tuskegee. A shortage of jobs for them made these enlisted men a drag on Tuskegee's housing and culinary departments.

Trained officers were also left idle as the plan to shift African-American officers into command slots stalled, and white officers not only continued to hold command but were joined by additional white officers assigned to the post. One rationale behind the non-assignment of trained African-American officers was stated by the commanding officer of the Army Air Forces, General Henry "Hap" Arnold: "Negro pilots cannot be used in our present Air Corps units since this would result in Negro officers serving over white enlisted men creating an impossible social situation."

=== Combat assignment ===
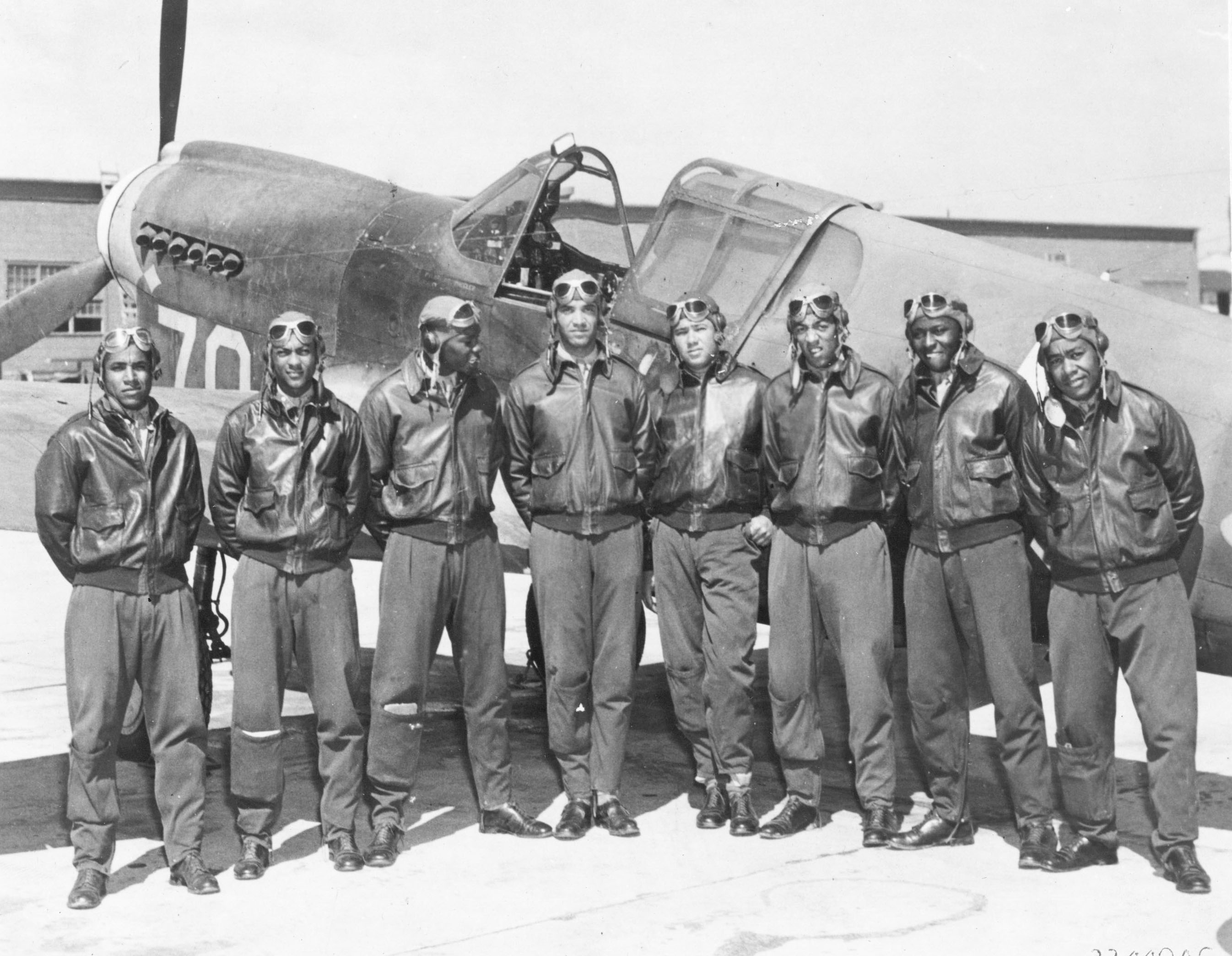
Eight Tuskegee Airmen in front of a P-40 fighter aircraft

The 99th was finally considered ready for combat duty by April 1943. It shipped out of Tuskegee on 2 April, bound for North Africa, where it joined the 33rd Fighter Group and its commander, Colonel William W. Momyer. Given little guidance from battle-experienced pilots, the 99th's first combat mission was to attack the small strategic volcanic island of Pantelleria, code name Operation Corkscrew, in the Mediterranean Sea to clear the sea lanes for the Allied invasion of Sicily in July 1943. The air assault on the island began 30 May 1943. The 99th flew its first combat mission on 2 June. The surrender of the garrison of 11,121 Italians and 78 Germans due to air attack was the first of its kind.

The 99th then moved on to Sicily and received a Distinguished Unit Citation (DUC) for its performance in combat.

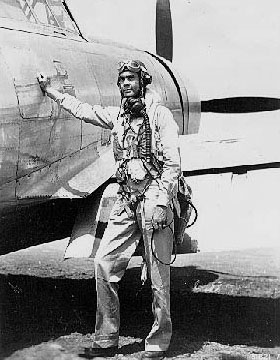
Col. Benjamin O. Davis Jr., commander of the Tuskegee Airmen 332nd Fighter Group, in front of his P-47 Thunderbolt in Sicily

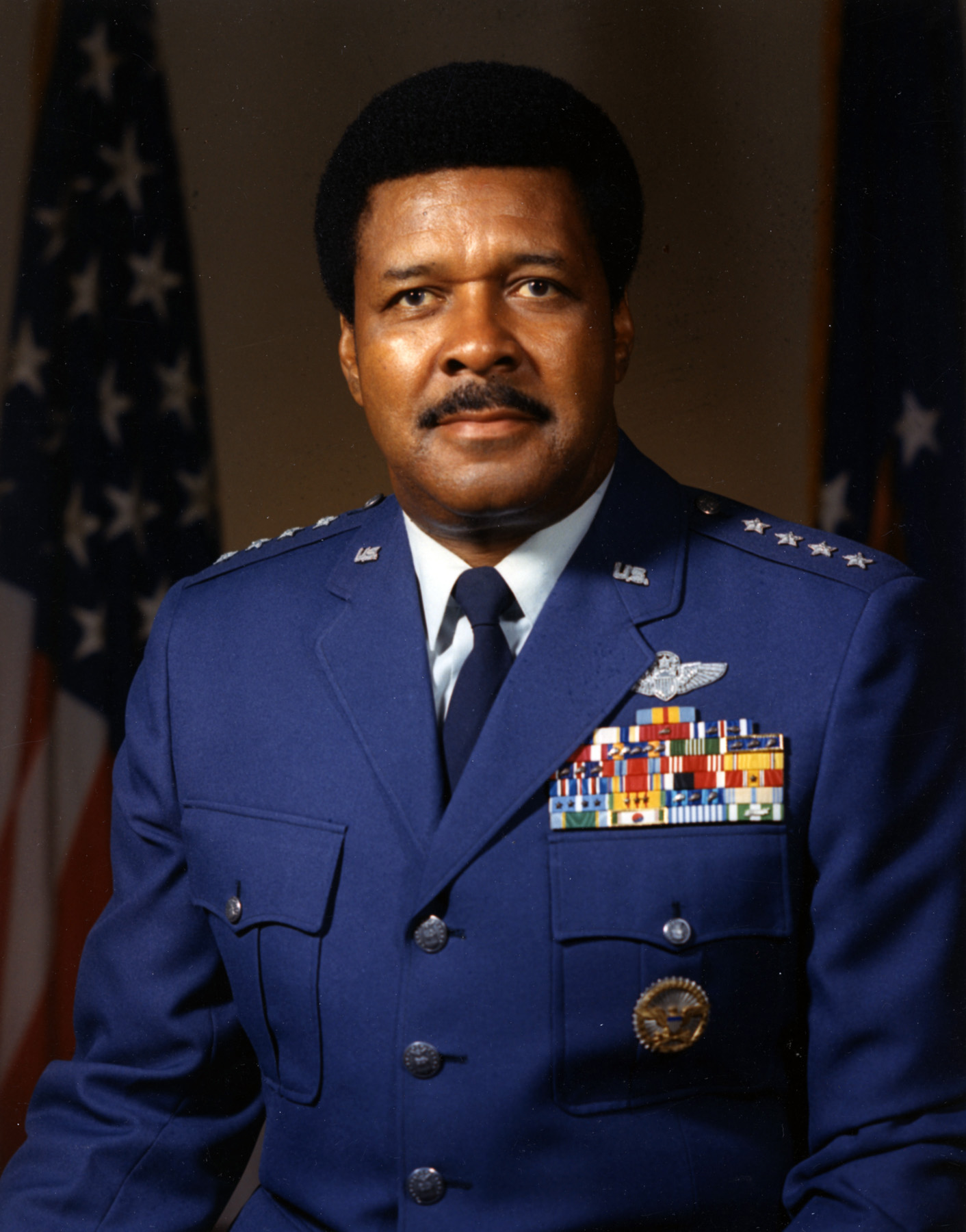
General Daniel "Chappie" James Jr., the first African-American four-star general in the United States Armed Forces, was a Tuskegee Airman lieutenant and instructor

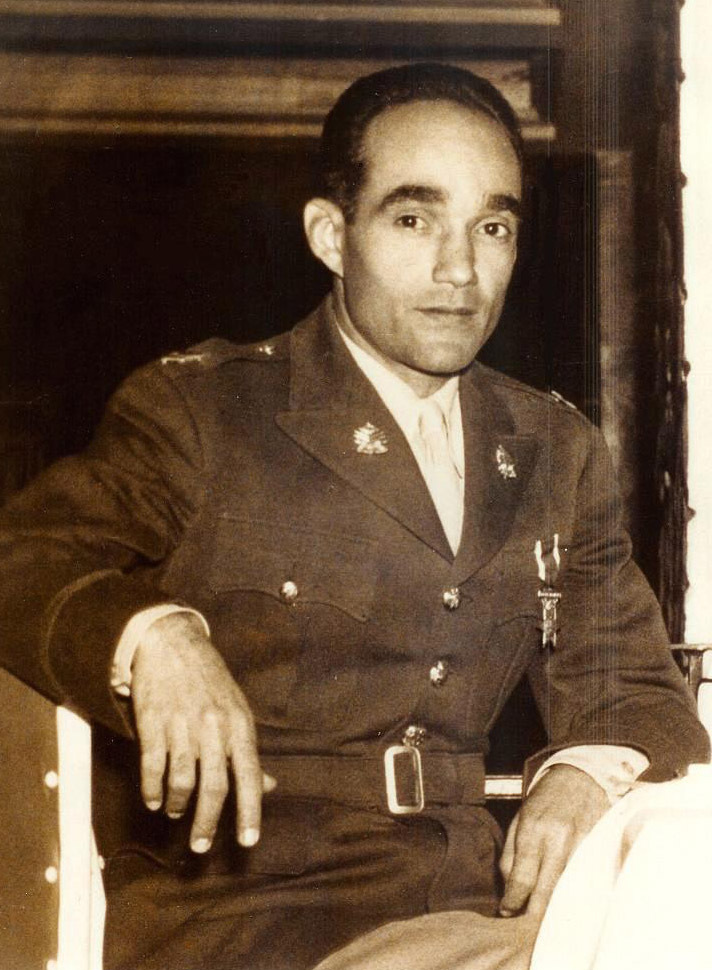
Tuskegee airman Alix Pasquet, date unknown

By the end of February 1944, the all-black 332nd Fighter Group had been sent overseas with three fighter squadrons: The 100th, 301st and 302nd.

Under the command of Colonel Davis, the squadrons were moved to mainland Italy, where the 99th Fighter Squadron, assigned to the group on 1 May 1944, joined them on 6 June at Ramitelli Airfield, nine kilometers south-southeast of the small city of Campomarino, on the Adriatic coast. From Ramitelli, the 332nd Fighter Group escorted Fifteenth Air Force heavy strategic bombing raids into Czechoslovakia, Austria, Hungary, Poland, and Germany.

Flying escort for heavy bombers, the 332nd earned an impressive combat record. The Allies called these airmen "Red Tails" or "Red-Tail Angels", because of the distinctive crimson unit identification marking predominantly applied on the tail section of the unit's aircraft.

A B-25 bomb group, the 477th Bombardment Group, was forming in the U.S. but was not able to complete its training in time to see action. The 99th Fighter Squadron after its return to the United States became part of the 477th, redesignated the 477th Composite Group.

==== Active air units ====
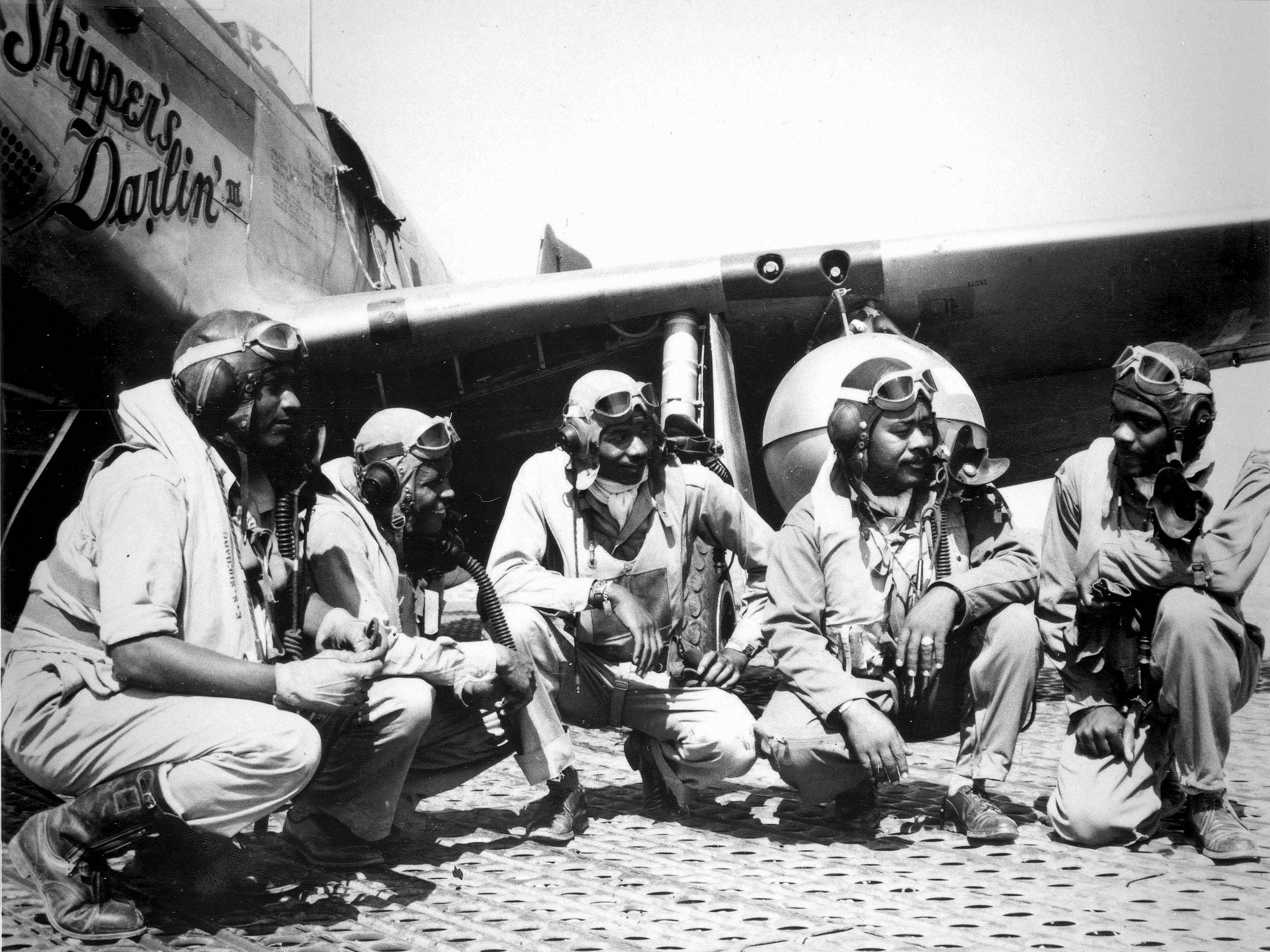
Pilots of the 332nd Fighter Group at Ramitelli Airfield, Italy; from left to right, Lt. Dempsey W. Morgan, Lt. Carroll S. Woods, Lt. Robert H. Nelson Jr., Captain Andrew D. Turner, and Lt. Clarence P. Lester

The only black air units that saw combat during the war were the 99th Pursuit Squadron and the 332nd Fighter Group. The dive-bombing and strafing missions under Lieutenant Colonel Benjamin O. Davis Jr. were considered to be highly successful.

In May 1942, the 99th Pursuit Squadron was renamed the 99th Fighter Squadron. It earned three Distinguished Unit Citations (DUC) during World War II. The DUCs were for operations over Sicily from 30 May to 11 June 1943, Monastery Hill near Cassino from 12 to 14 May 1944, and for successfully fighting off German jet aircraft on 24 March 1945. The mission was the longest bomber escort mission of the Fifteenth Air Force throughout the war. The 332nd flew missions in Sicily, Anzio, Normandy, the Rhineland, the Po Valley and Rome-Arno and others. Pilots of the 99th once set a record for destroying five enemy aircraft in under four minutes.

The Tuskegee Airmen shot down three German jets in a single day. On 24 March 1945, 43 P-51 Mustangs led by Colonel Benjamin O. Davis escorted B-17 bombers over 1,600 miles (2,600 km) into Germany and back. The bombers' target, a massive Daimler-Benz tank factory in Berlin, was heavily defended by Luftwaffe aircraft, including propeller-driven Fw 190s, Me 163 "Komet" rocket-powered fighters, and 25 of the much more formidable Me 262s, history's first operational jet fighter. Pilots Charles Brantley, Earl Lane and Roscoe Brown all shot down German jets over Berlin that day. For the mission, the 332nd Fighter Group earned a Distinguished Unit Citation.

Pilots of the 332nd Fighter Group earned 96 Distinguished Flying Crosses. Their missions took them over Italy and enemy-occupied parts of central and southern Europe. Their operational aircraft were, in succession: Curtiss P-40 Warhawk, Bell P-39 Airacobra, Republic P-47 Thunderbolt and North American P-51 Mustang fighter aircraft.

=== Tuskegee Airmen bomber units ===
==== Formation ====
With African-American fighter pilots being trained successfully, the Army Air Force now came under political pressure from the NAACP and other civil rights organizations to organize a bomber unit. There could be no defensible argument that the quota of 100 African-American pilots in training at one time, or 200 per year out of a total of 60,000 American aviation cadets in annual training, represented the service potential of 13 million African-Americans. (Note: The physical requirements that made it possible to fit in a fighter's cockpit with a height less than 70 inches, weight under 170 pounds, precluded many larger African-American men from eligibility.)

On 13 May 1943, the 616th Bombardment Squadron was established as the initial subordinate squadron of the 477th Bombardment Group, an all-white group. The squadron was activated on 1 July 1943, only to be inactivated on 15 August 1943. By September 1943, the number of washed-out cadets on base had surged to 286, with few of them working. In January 1944, the 477th Bombardment Group was reactivated—an all-Black group. At the time, the usual training cycle for a bombardment group took three to four months.

The 477th eventually contained four medium bomber squadrons. Slated to comprise 1,200 officers and enlisted men, the unit operated 60 North American B-25 Mitchell bombers. (Note: Each B-25 bomber cost $175,000. The overall cost of the entire group was estimated at $20,000,000.) The 477th went on to encompass three more bomber squadrons–the 617th Bombardment Squadron, the 618th Bombardment Squadron, and the 619th Bombardment Squadron. The 477th was anticipated to be ready for action in November 1944.

The home field for the 477th was Selfridge Field, located outside Detroit, with forays to Oscoda Army Air Field in Oscoda, Michigan. (Note: 15 of these aviators died while training in Michigan. Among them was 2nd Lieutenant Frank Moody, whose P-39 Airacobra emitted black smoke and cartwheeled into Lake Huron on 11 April 1944. His body was recovered shortly thereafter in the Saint Clair River. His aircraft was discovered by divers 70 years to the day after the accident. Per the Alcona County Review:"The first African American pilots training by the United States Army Air Corps earned their wings at Tuskegee Army Airfield in Alabama during World War II. Beginning in the spring of1943, fighter pilots from Tuskegee received advanced training in Michigan. "The relative safety of Midwestern America, along with weather in geographical conditions that approximated what aviators could expect to encounter in Europe, encouraged the military to use airfields at Selfridge northeast of Detroit, and at Oscoda on the shores of Lake Huron.") Other bases were used for various types of training courses. Twin-engine pilot training began at Tuskegee while the transition to multi-engine pilot training was at Mather Field, California. Some ground crews trained at Mather before rotating to Inglewood. Gunners learned to shoot at Eglin Field, Florida. Bombers-navigators learned their trades at Hondo Army Air Field and Midland Air Field, Texas or at Roswell, New Mexico. Training of the new African-American crewmen also took place at Sioux Falls, South Dakota, Lincoln, Nebraska, and Scott Field, Belleville, Illinois. Once trained, the air and ground crews were spliced into a working unit at Selfridge.

==== Command difficulties ====
The new group's first commanding officer was Colonel Robert Selway, who had also commanded the 332nd Fighter Group before it deployed for combat overseas. Like his ranking officer, Major General Frank O'Driscoll Hunter from Georgia, Selway was a racial segregationist. Hunter was blunt about it, saying such things as "...racial friction will occur if colored and white pilots are trained together." He backed Selway's violations of Army Regulation 210–10, which forbade segregation of airbase facilities. They segregated base facilities so thoroughly that they even drew a line in the base theater and ordered separate seating by race. When the audience sat in random patterns as part of "Operation Checkerboard", the movie was halted to make men return to segregated seating. African-American officers petitioned base commanding officer William Boyd for access to the only officer's club on base. Lieutenant Milton Henry entered the club and personally demanded his club rights; he was court-martialed for this.

Subsequently, Colonel Boyd denied club rights to African-Americans, although General Hunter stepped in and promised a separate but equal club would be built for black airmen. The 477th was transferred to Godman Field, Kentucky before the club was built. They had spent five months at Selfridge but found themselves on a base a fraction of Selfridge's size, with no air-to-ground gunnery range and deteriorating runways that were too short for B-25 landings. Colonel Selway took on the second role of the commanding officer of Godman Field. In that capacity, he ceded Godman Field's officers club to African-American airmen. White officers used the whites-only clubs at nearby Fort Knox, much to the displeasure of African-American officers.

Another irritant was a professional one for African-American officers. They observed a steady flow of white officers through the command positions of the group and squadrons; these officers stayed just long enough to be "promotable" before transferring out at their new rank. This seemed to take about four months. In an extreme example, 22-year-old Robert Mattern was promoted to captain, transferred into squadron command in the 477th days later, and left a month later as a major. He was replaced by another white officer. Meanwhile, no Tuskegee Airmen held command.

On 15 March 1945, the 477th was transferred to Freeman Field, near Seymour, Indiana. The white population of Freeman Field was 250 officers and 600 enlisted men. Superimposed on it were 400 African-American officers and 2,500 enlisted men of the 477th and its associated units. Freeman Field had a firing range, usable runways, and other amenities useful for training. African-American airmen worked in proximity with white ones; both lived in a public housing project adjacent to the base.

Colonel Selway turned the noncommissioned officers out of their club and turned it into a second officers' club. He then classified all white personnel as cadre and all African-Americans as trainees. One officers' club became the cadre's club. The old Non-Commissioned Officers Club, promptly sarcastically dubbed "Uncle Tom's Cabin", became the trainees' officers club. At least four of the trainees had flown combat in Europe as fighter pilots and had about four years in service. Four others had completed training as pilots, bombardiers and navigators and may have been the only triply qualified officers in the entire Air Corps. Several of the Tuskegee Airmen had logged more than 900 flight hours by this time. Nevertheless, by Colonel Selway's fiat, they were trainees.

Off base was no better; many businesses in Seymour would not serve African-Americans. A local laundry would not wash their clothes and yet willingly laundered those of captured German soldiers.

In early April 1945, the 118th Base Unit transferred in from Godman Field; its African-American personnel held orders that specified they were base cadre, not trainees. On 5 April, officers of the 477th peaceably tried to enter the whites-only officer's club. Selway had been tipped off by a phone call and had the assistant provost marshal and base billeting manager stationed at the door to refuse the 477th officers' entry. The latter, a major, ordered them to leave and took their names as a means of arresting them when they refused. It was the beginning of the Freeman Field Mutiny.

In the wake of the Freeman Field Mutiny, the 616th and 619th were disbanded and the returned 99th Fighter Squadron was assigned to the 477th on 22 June 1945; it was redesignated the 477th Composite Group as a result. On 1 July 1945, Colonel Robert Selway was relieved of the Group's command; he was replaced by Colonel Benjamin O. Davis Jr. A complete sweep of Selway's white staff followed, with all vacated jobs filled by African-American officers. The war ended before the 477th Composite Group could get into action. The 618th Bombardment Squadron was disbanded on 8 October 1945. On 13 March 1946, the two-squadron group, supported by the 602nd Engineer Squadron (later renamed 602nd Air Engineer Squadron), the 118th Base Unit, and a band, moved to its final station, Lockbourne Field. The 617th Bombardment Squadron and the 99th Fighter Squadron disbanded on 1 July 1947, ending the 477th Composite Group. It was reorganized as the 332nd Fighter Wing.

=== War accomplishments ===
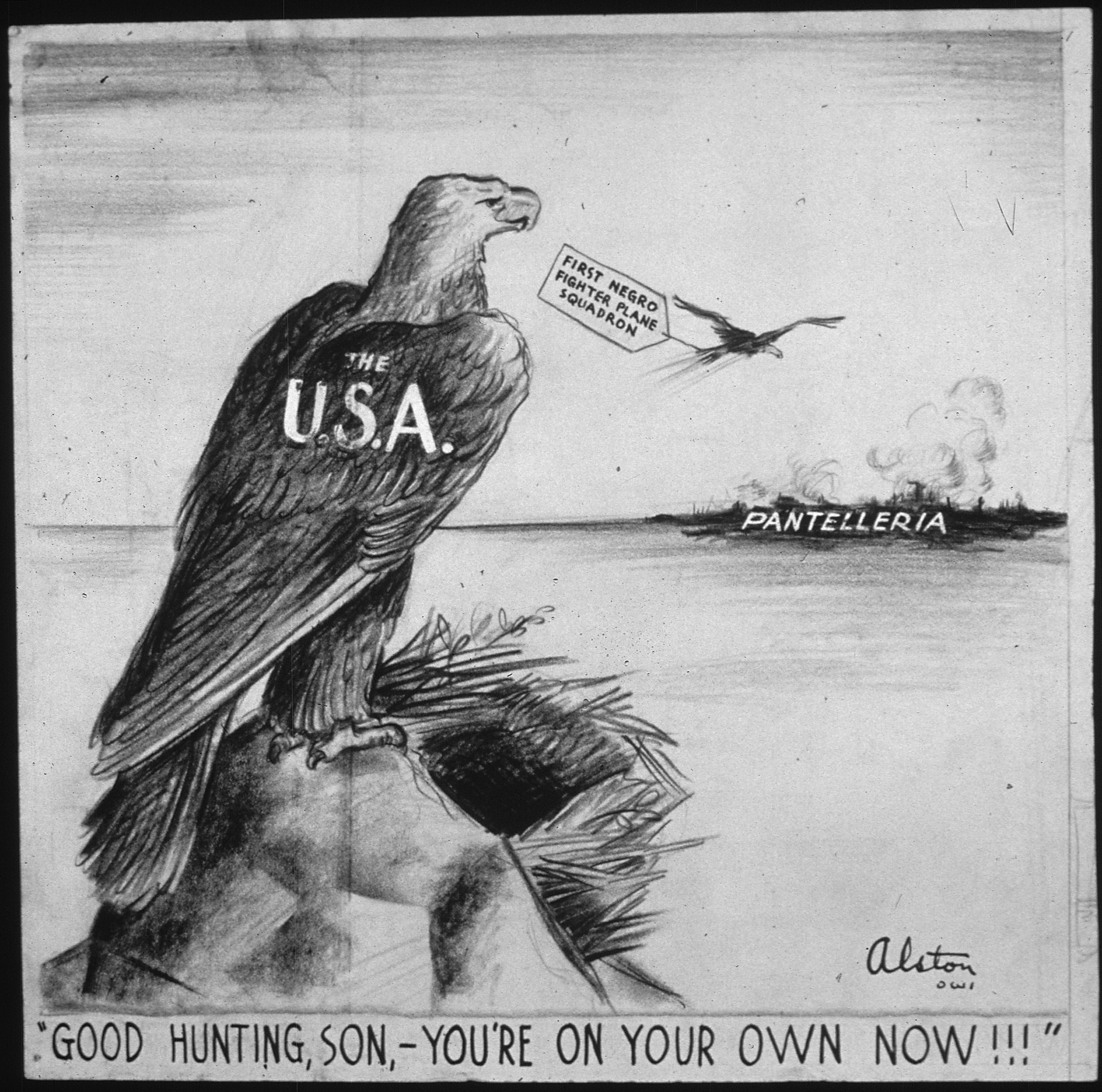
Office of War Information poster

In all, 992 pilots were trained in Tuskegee from 1941 to 1946. 355 were deployed overseas, and 84 lost their lives. The toll included 68 pilots killed in action or accidents, 12 killed in training and non-combat missions and 32 captured as prisoners of war.

The Tuskegee Airmen were credited by higher commands with the following accomplishments:

- 1578 combat missions, 1267 for the Twelfth Air Force; 311 for the Fifteenth Air Force
- 179 bomber escort missions, with a good record of protection, losing bombers on only seven missions and a total of only 27, compared to an average of 46 among other 15th Air Force P-51 groups
- 112 enemy aircraft destroyed in the air, another 150 on the ground and 148 damaged. This included three Messerschmitt Me 262 jet fighters shot down
- 950 rail cars, trucks and other motor vehicles destroyed (more than 600 rail cars)
- One torpedo boat put out of action. TA22 was an Italian World War I-era destroyer (Giuseppe Missori), that had been seized by the Germans and put into service. It was attacked on 25 June 1944, and damaged so severely she was never repaired. She was decommissioned on 8 November 1944, and finally scuttled on 5 February 1945.
- 40 boats and barges destroyed

Awards and decorations included:

- Three Distinguished Unit Citations
  - 99th Pursuit Squadron: 30 May – 11 June 1943, for actions over Sicily
  - 99th Fighter Squadron: 12–14 May 1944: for successful airstrikes against Monte Cassino, Italy. The first two Distinguished Unit Citations received by the 99th Fighter Squadron were awarded to the groups to which the squadron was attached. At the time, when a group received the honor, it was shared with the squadrons that were assigned or attached to the group.
  - 332nd Fighter Group (and its 99th, 100th, and 301st Fighter Squadrons): 24 March 1945: for a bomber escort mission to Berlin, during which pilots of the 100th FS shot down three enemy Me 262 jets. The 302nd Fighter Squadron did not receive this award as it had been disbanded on 6 March 1945.
- At least one Silver Star
- 96 Distinguished Flying Crosses to 95 Airmen; Captain William A. Campbell was awarded two.
- 14 Bronze Stars
- 744 Air Medals
- At least 60 Purple Hearts

==== Controversy over escort record ====
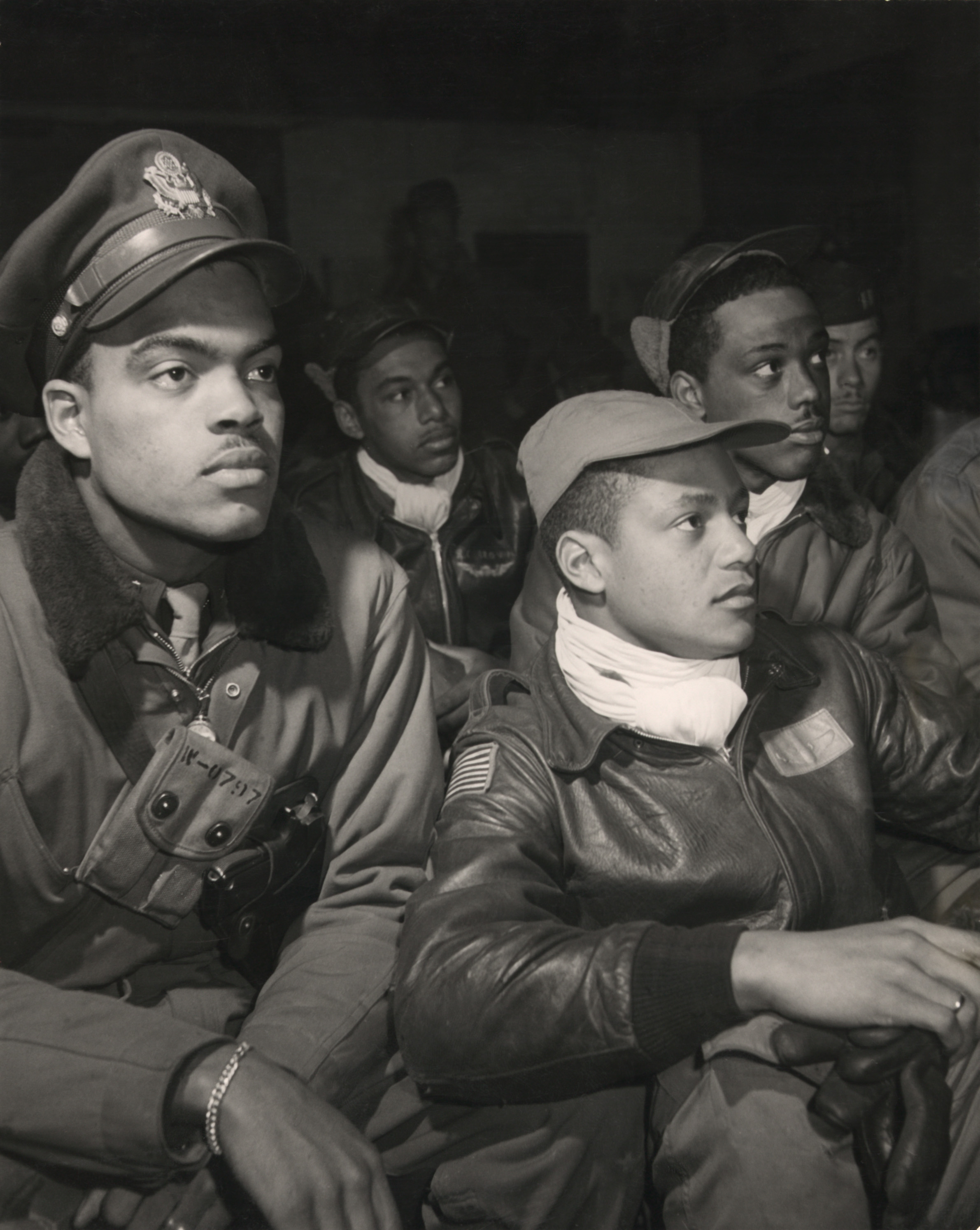
Men of the 332nd Fighter Group attend a briefing in Italy 1945

For decades, the Tuskegee Airmen were popularly believed to have never lost a bomber under escort. This belief derived most directly to an article, "332nd Flies Its 200th Mission Without Loss", published by the Chicago Defender on 24 March 1945. Citing information supplied by the 15th Air Force, the article said that no bomber escorted by the Tuskegee Airmen had ever been lost to enemy fire.

This statement was repeated for many years, and not publicly challenged, partly because the mission reports were classified for a number of years after the war. In 2004, William Holton, who was serving as the historian of the Tuskegee Airmen Incorporated, conducted research into wartime action reports. Alan Gropman, a professor at the National Defense University, disputed the initial refutations of the no-loss myth and said he researched more than 200 Tuskegee Airmen mission reports and found no bombers were lost to enemy fighters.

Daniel Haulman of the Air Force Historical Research Agency (AFHRA) reassessed the history of the unit in 2006 and early 2007. He documented 25 bombers shot down by enemy fighter aircraft while being escorted by the Tuskegee Airmen, citing after-mission reports filed by the bomber units and Tuskegee fighter groups, records of missing air crew, and witness testimony.

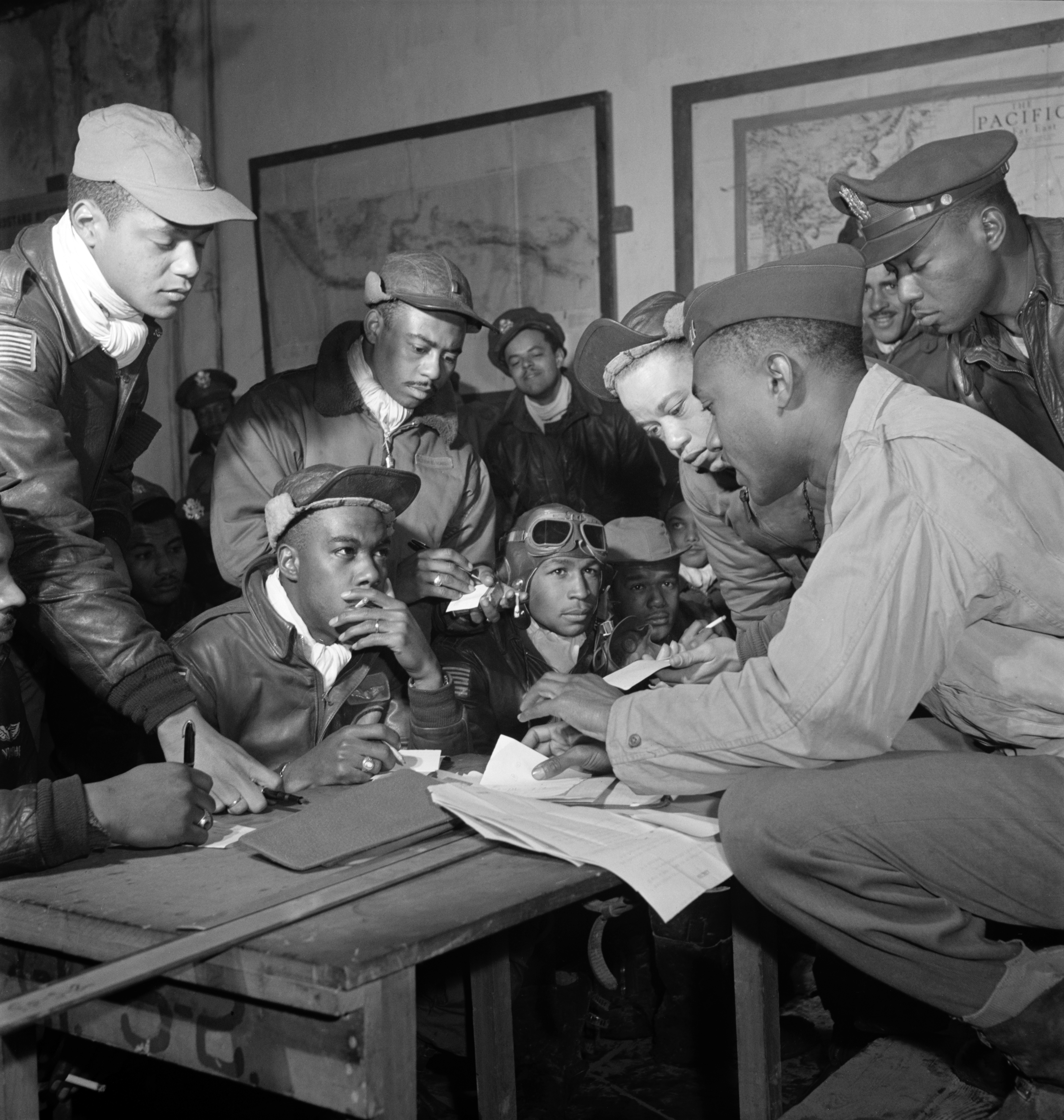
Several Tuskegee Airmen at Ramitelli, Italy, March 1945

Haulman wrote a subsequent article, "The Tuskegee Airmen and the Never Lost a Bomber Myth", published in the Alabama Review and by NewSouth Books as an e-book, and included in a more comprehensive study regarding misconceptions about the Tuskegee Airmen released by AFHRA in July 2013. The article documented 27 bombers shot down by enemy aircraft while those bombers were being escorted by the 332nd Fighter Group. This total included 15 B-17s of the 483rd Bombardment Group shot down during a particularly savage air battle with an estimated 300 German fighters on 18 July 1944, that also resulted in nine kill credits and the award of five Distinguished Flying Crosses to members of the 332nd.

Of the 179 bomber escort missions the 332nd Fighter Group flew for the Fifteenth Air Force, the group encountered enemy aircraft on 35 of those missions and lost bombers to enemy aircraft on only seven, and the total number of bombers lost was 27. By comparison, the average number of bombers lost by the other P-51 fighter groups of the Fifteenth Air Force during the same period was 46.

In 2022, Dr. Haulman published a comprehensive study that established that the record of the 332nd differed substantially from that of the three other P-51 groups assigned to Fifteenth Air Force in terms of bombers lost. The group was noticeably better at protecting bombers they escorted, even if not perfect. While the 332nd only lost 27 escorted heavy bombers while flying 179 escort missions, (Note: Statistics for the 332nd Group include escort missions flown with P-47s.) the 31st Fighter Group lost 49 in 184 missions, the 325th lost 68 in 192 escort missions, while the 52nd lost 88 in 193 missions. Moreover, the 332nd flew more missions than any of the other three groups on which they lost no escorted bombers. Combining these numbers with the numbers of enemy aircraft destroyed by each of these groups suggests that the 332nd stuck closer to protect the bombers they escorted, while the other groups were willing to pursue enemy fighters away from the bombers.

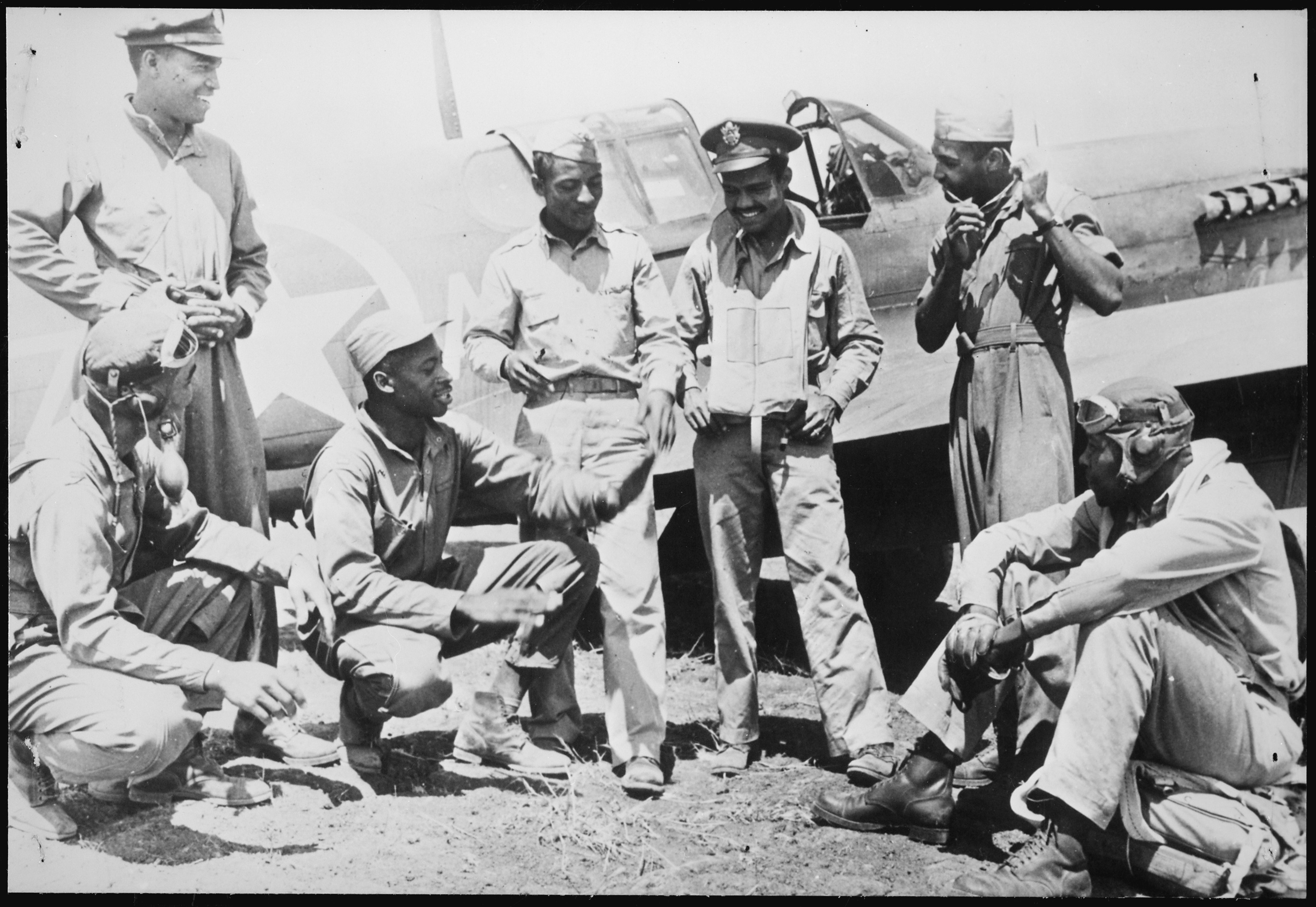
Tuskegee Airmen gathered at a U.S. base after a mission in the Mediterranean theater

The historical record shows several examples of the fighter group's losses. A mission report states that on 26 July 1944: "1 B-24 seen spiraling out of formation in T/A [target area] after attack by E/A [enemy aircraft]. No chutes seen to open." The Distinguished Flying Cross citation awarded to Colonel Benjamin O. Davis for the mission on 9 June 1944, noted that he "so skillfully disposed his squadrons that in spite of the large number of enemy fighters, the bomber formation suffered only a few losses."

William H. Holloman was reported by the Times as saying his review of records confirmed bombers had been lost. Holloman was a member of Tuskegee Airmen Inc., a group of surviving Tuskegee pilots and their supporters, who also taught Black Studies at the University of Washington and chaired the Airmen's history committee. According to the 28 March 2007 Air Force report, some bombers under 332nd Fighter Group escort protection were even shot down on the day the Chicago Defender article was published. The mission reports, however, do credit the group for not losing a bomber on an escort mission for a six-month period between September 1944 and March 1945, albeit when Luftwaffe contacts were far fewer than earlier.

=== Postwar ===
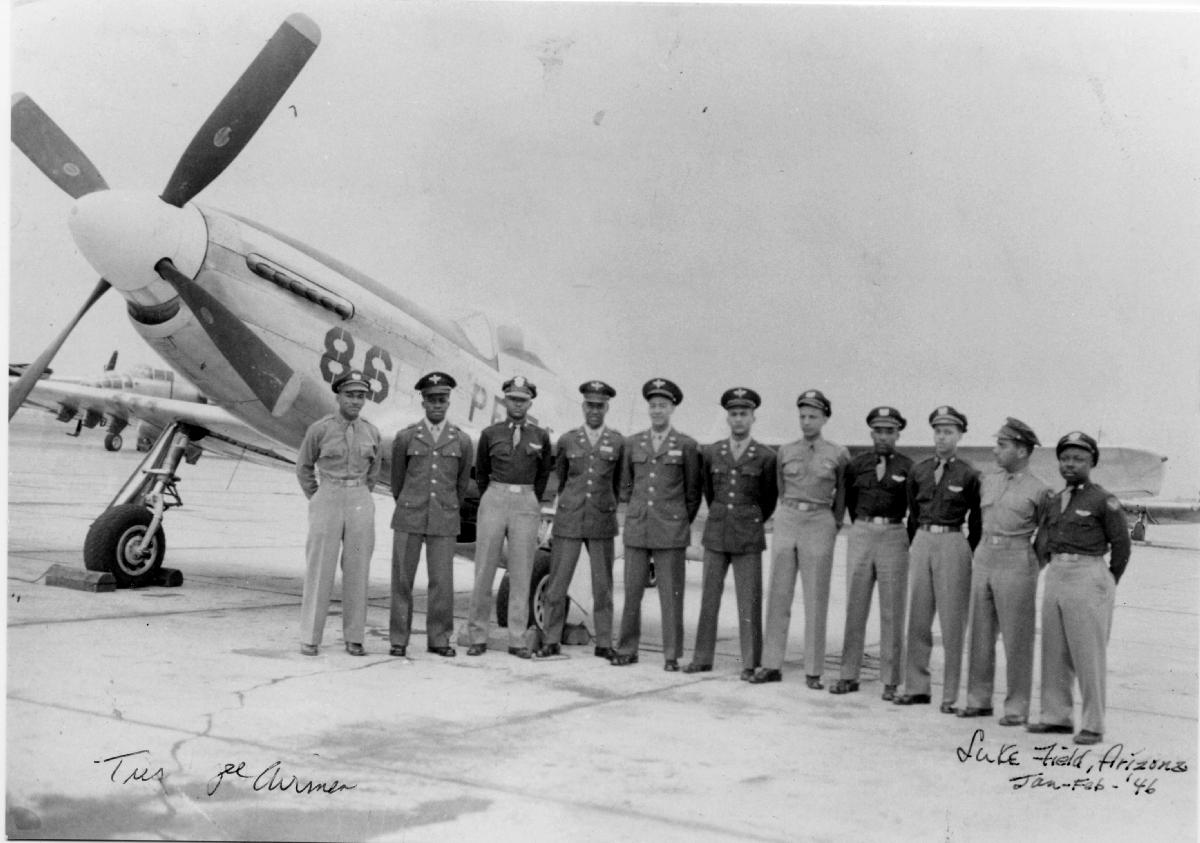
Various Tuskegee Airmen by a P-51 Mustang at Luke Field, around January or February 1946.

Contrary to negative predictions from some quarters, Tuskegee Airmen were some of the best pilots in the U.S. Army Air Forces due to a combination of pre-war experience and the personal drive of those accepted for training. Nevertheless, the Tuskegee Airmen continued to have to fight racism. Their combat record did much to quiet those directly involved with the group, but other units continued to harass these airmen.

In 1949, the 332nd entered the annual U.S. Continental Gunnery Meet in Las Vegas, Nevada. The competition included shooting aerial and ground targets and dropping bombs on targets. Flying the long-range Republic P-47N Thunderbolt (built for the long-range escort mission in the Pacific theatre of World War II), the 332nd Fighter Wing took first place in the conventional fighter class. The pilots were Captain Alva Temple, Lts. Harry Stewart, Jr., James H. Harvey III and Halbert Alexander. Staff Sergeant Buford A. Johnson (30 August 1927 – 15 April 2017) served as the pilots' aircraft crew chief. Lt. Harvey said, "We had a perfect score. Three missions, two bombs per plane. We didn't guess at anything, we were good." They received congratulations from the governor of Ohio and Air Force commanders across the nation.

After segregation in the military was ended in 1948 by President Harry S. Truman with Executive Order 9981, the veteran Tuskegee Airmen found themselves in high demand throughout the newly formed United States Air Force. Some taught in civilian flight schools, such as the black-owned Columbia Air Center in Maryland. On 11 May 1949, Air Force Letter 35.3 mandated that black Airmen be screened for reassignment to formerly all-white units according to qualifications.

Tuskegee Airmen were instrumental in postwar developments in aviation. Edward A. Gibbs, a civilian flight instructor who helped launch in the U.S. Aviation Cadet Program at Tuskegee, later became the founder of Negro Airmen International, an association joined by many airmen. USAF General Daniel "Chappie" James Jr. (then Lt.) was an instructor of the 99th Pursuit Squadron and later a fighter pilot in Europe. In 1975, he became the first African-American to reach the rank of four-star general. Post-war commander of the 99th Squadron Marion Rodgers went on to work in communications for NORAD and as a program developer for the Apollo 13 project.

In 2005, seven Tuskegee Airmen, including Lieutenant Colonel Herbert Carter, Colonel Charles McGee, group historian Ted Johnson, and Lieutenant Colonel Lee Archer, flew to Balad, Iraq, to speak to active duty airmen serving in the current incarnation of the 332nd, which was reactivated as the 332nd Air Expeditionary Group in 1998 and made part of the 332nd Air Expeditionary Wing. "This group represents the linkage between the 'greatest generation' of airmen and the 'latest generation' of airmen," said Lt. Gen. Walter E. Buchanan III, commander of the Ninth Air Force and U.S. Central Command Air Forces.

As of 2008, no one knew how many of the original 996 pilots and about 16,000 ground personnel were still alive. In August 2019, 14 documented original surviving members of the Tuskegee Airmen participated at the annual Tuskegee Airmen Convention, which is hosted by Tuskegee Airmen, Inc. As of 1 January 2023, there were three surviving members.

Willie Rogers, one of the last surviving members of the original Tuskegee Airmen, died at the age of 101 on 18 November 2016 in St. Petersburg, Florida, following a stroke. Rogers was drafted into the Army in 1942 and was part of the 100th Air Engineer Squad. Rogers also served with the Red Tail Angels. He was wounded in action, shot in the stomach and leg by German soldiers during a mission in Italy in January 1943. In 2007, President George W. Bush awarded the Congressional Gold Medal to the 300 surviving Tuskegee Airmen, but Rogers was not present. He was given a medal in 2013 after he revealed his previously undisclosed involvement. His pastor, Rev. Irby, said Rogers was a "passionate oral historian".

Capt. Lawrence E. Dickson, 24, had gone missing while flying a P-51 Mustang and escorting a reconnaissance flight to Prague from Italy on 23 December 1944. He was on his 68th mission and had previously been awarded the Distinguished Flying Cross. On 27 July 2018, his remains, which had been recovered in Austria a year earlier, were conclusively identified and confirmed to his daughter – included with them was a ring inscribed from her mother to her father and dated 1943. The day before the announcement, his wingman, 2nd Lt. Robert L. Martin, had died at 99, in Olympia Fields, Illinois. The bodies of 26 other Tuskegee Airmen who disappeared in WWII remain unrecovered.

In 2019, Lt. Col. Robert J. Friend, one of 12 remaining Tuskegee Airmen at the time, died on 21 June in Long Beach at the age of 99. He had flown 142 combat missions in World War II. A public viewing and memorial was held at the Palm Springs Air Museum on 6 July. He had spoken about his experiences in many different events before to his death, such as in John Murdy Elementary School's "The Gratitude Project" in Garden Grove.

On January 16, 2022, Brigadier General Charles McGee died in his sleep at the age of 102. His 30-year military career included 409 combat missions in World War II, the Korean War, and Vietnam War.

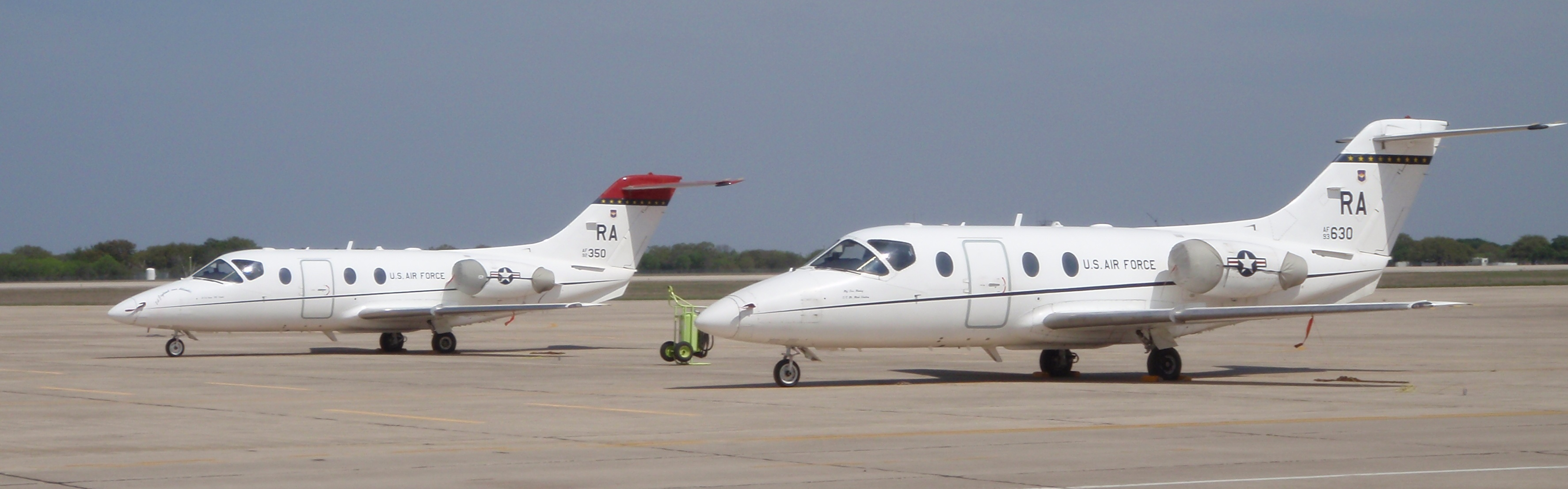
Red Tails continue to fly in the 99th Flying Training Squadron at Randolph Air Force Base in honor of the Tuskegee Airmen

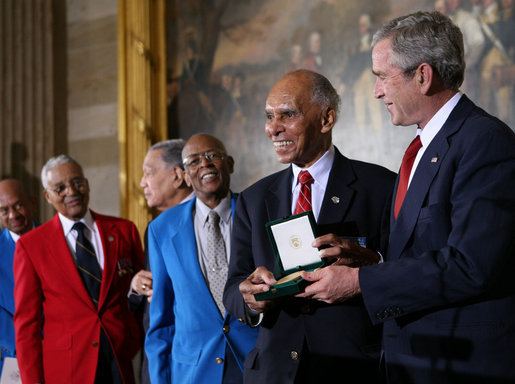
The Congressional Gold Medal was collectively presented to approximately 300 Tuskegee Airmen or their widows, at the U.S. Capitol rotunda in Washington, D.C. by President George W. Bush on March 29, 2007.

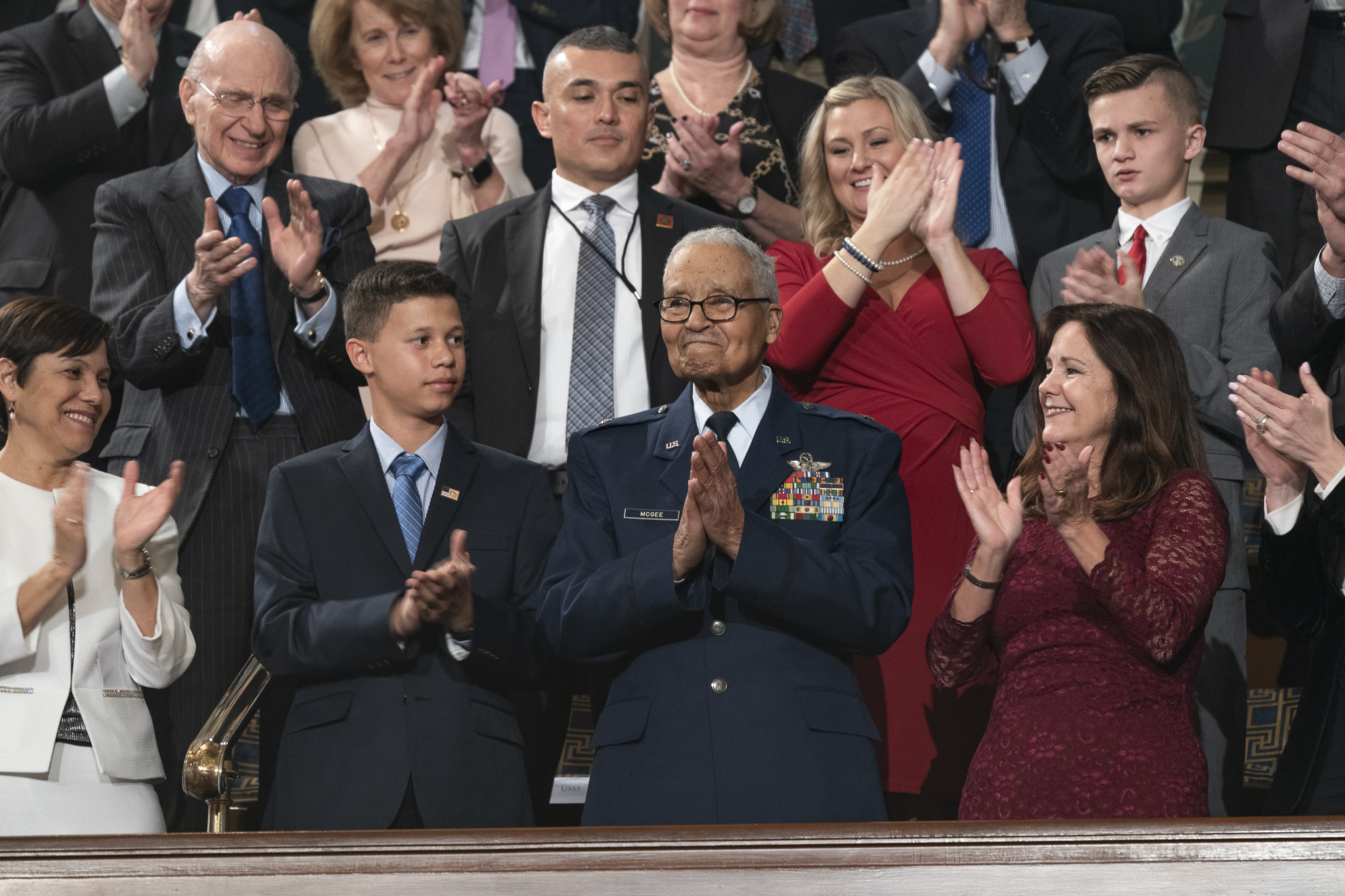
Brigadier General Charles McGee being honored by President Donald Trump at the 2020 State of the Union Address, with his great-grandson Iain Lanphier to the left and Second Lady Karen Pence to the right

On February 2, 2025, Lt Col. Harry Stewart Jr. died, thus leaving Lt. Col. George Hardy as the last surviving member of the original 355 Tuskegee Airmen who served in World War II. Hardy died at age 100 on September 24, 2025. James H. Harvey, III, who did not serve in combat during World War II but who did later manage to be a member of the USAF's inaugural "Top Gun" team in 1949 and serve in combat missions in the Korean War, lives as well, as does Lt. Eugene J. Richardson, who also did not serve in World War II combat missions. James Clayton Flowers, Thomas Franklin Vaughns and Lt. Col. Enoch "Woody" Woodhouse are also living.

== Legacy and honors ==
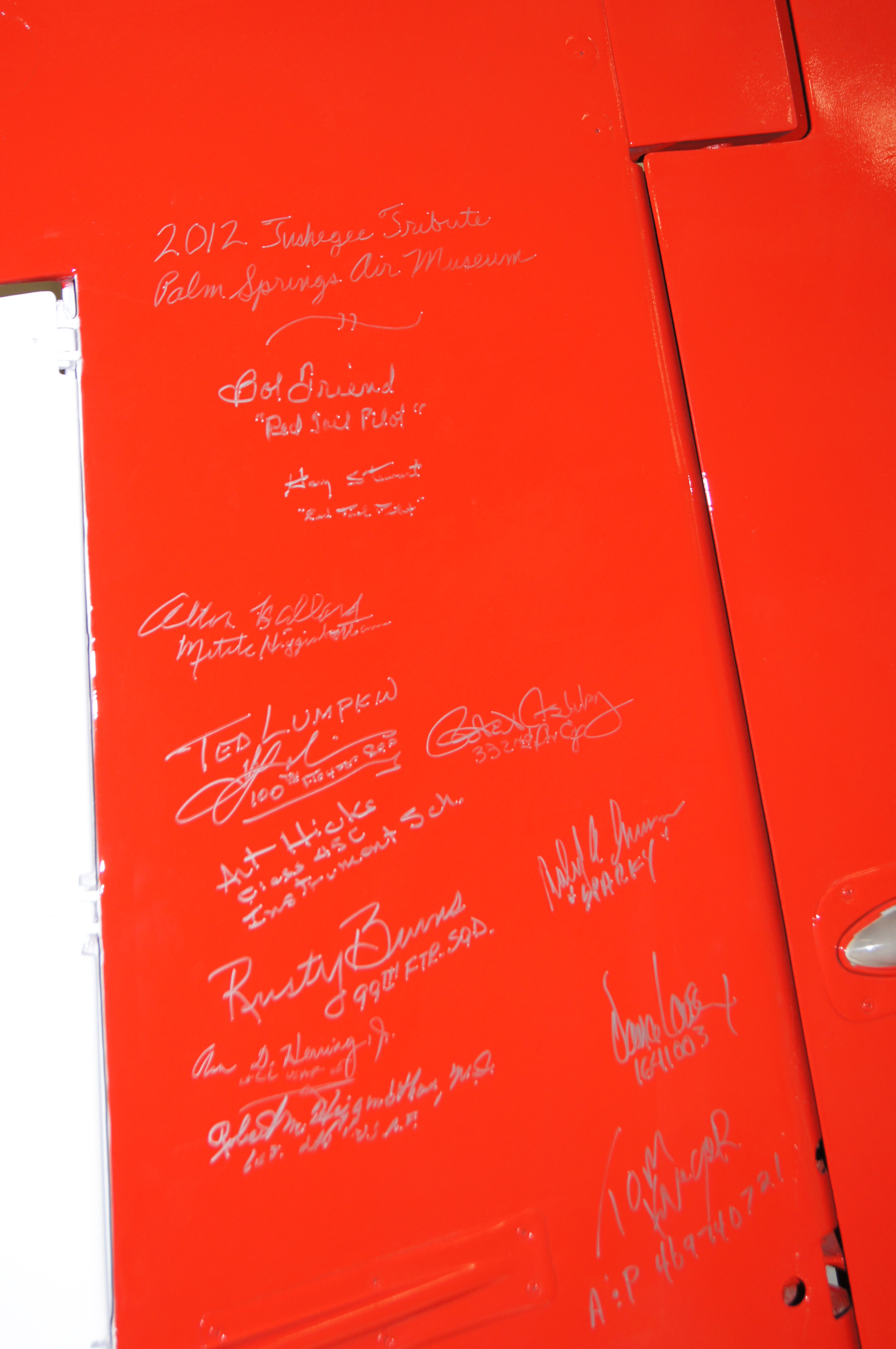
A tail signed by surviving Tuskegee Airmen located at the Palm Springs Air Museum, Palm Springs, California.

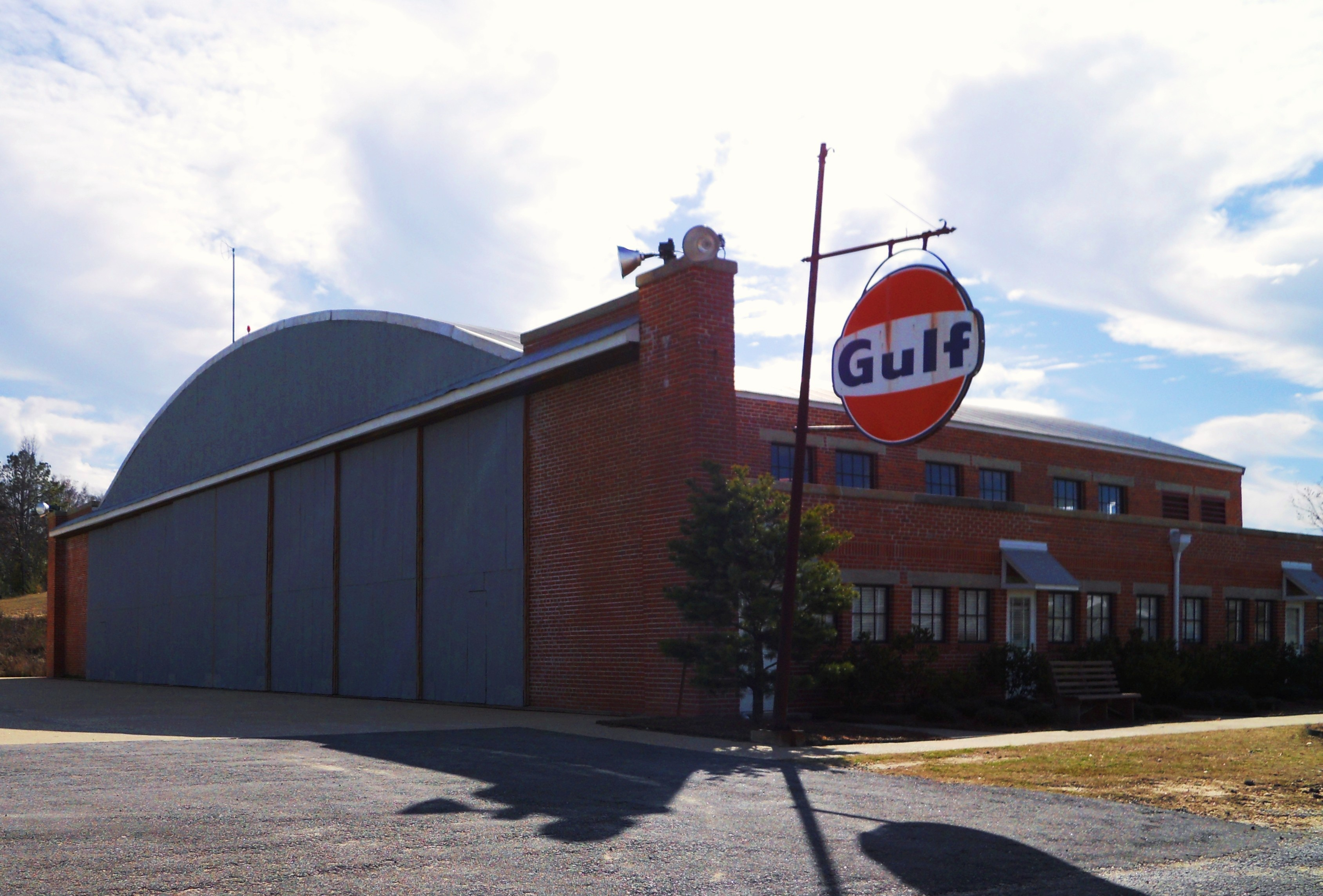
The Hangar One Museum at the Tuskegee Airmen National Historic Site at Moton Field, Tuskegee, Alabama.

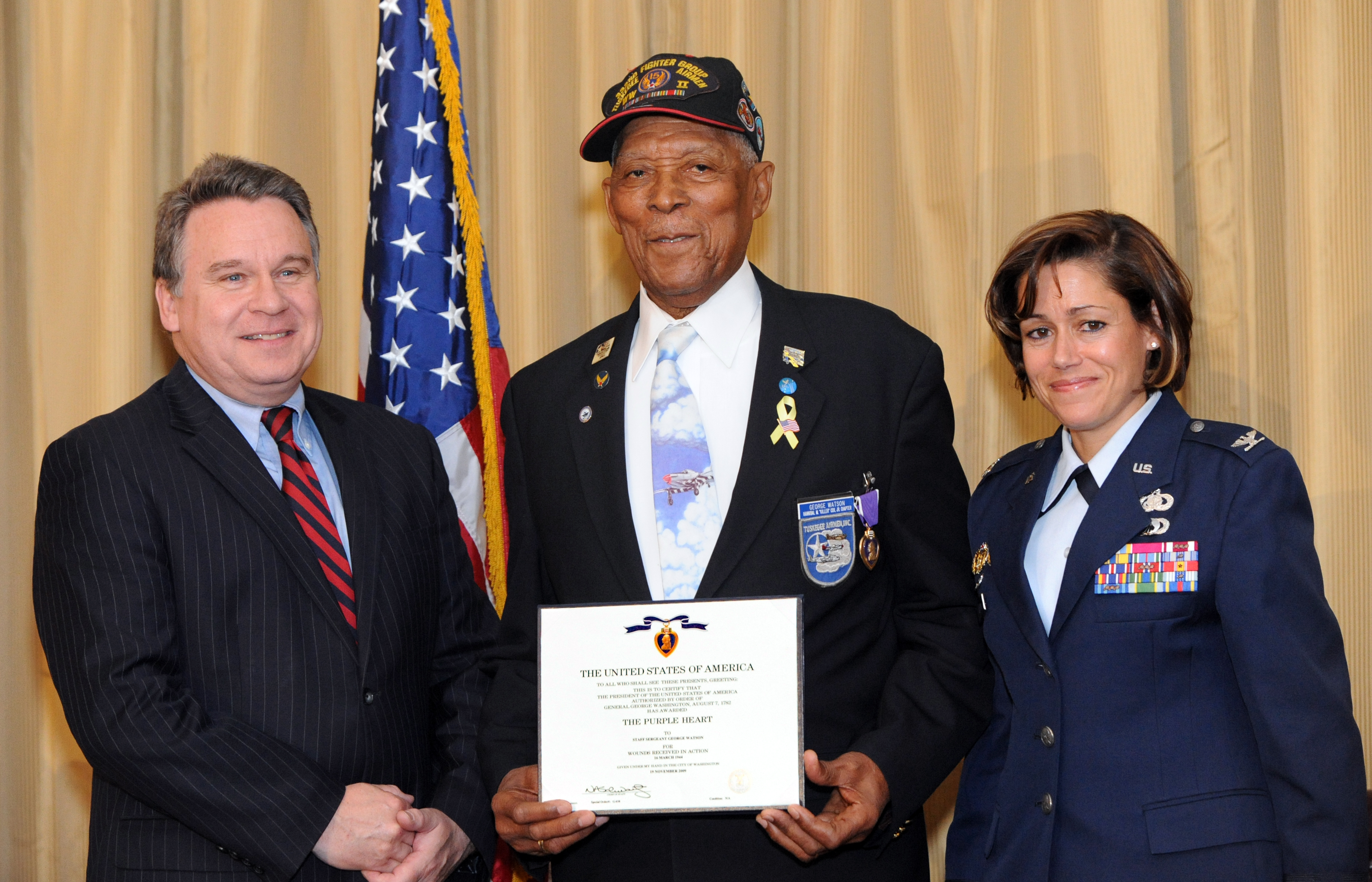
Congressman Christopher Smith presented the Purple Heart Medal to Tuskegee Airman Tech. Sgt. (Ret.) George Watson Sr. with then Col. Gina M. Grosso, Joint Base McGuire-Dix-Lakehurst commander in 2010

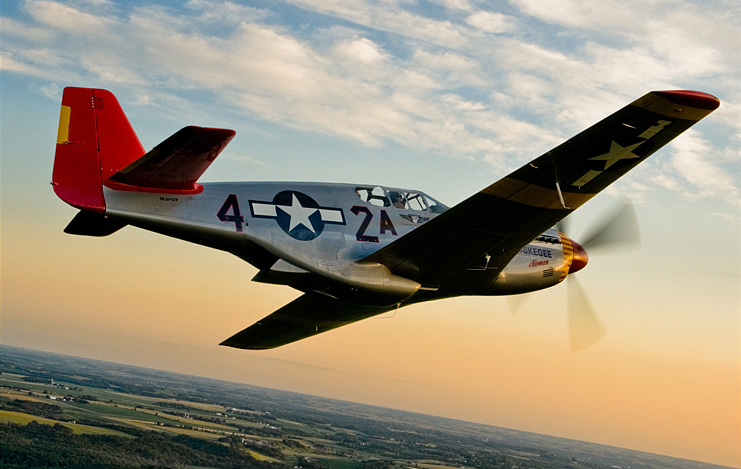
The restored P-51 Mustang associated with the Tuskegee Airmen, now flown by Red Tail Project as described in Red Tail Reborn

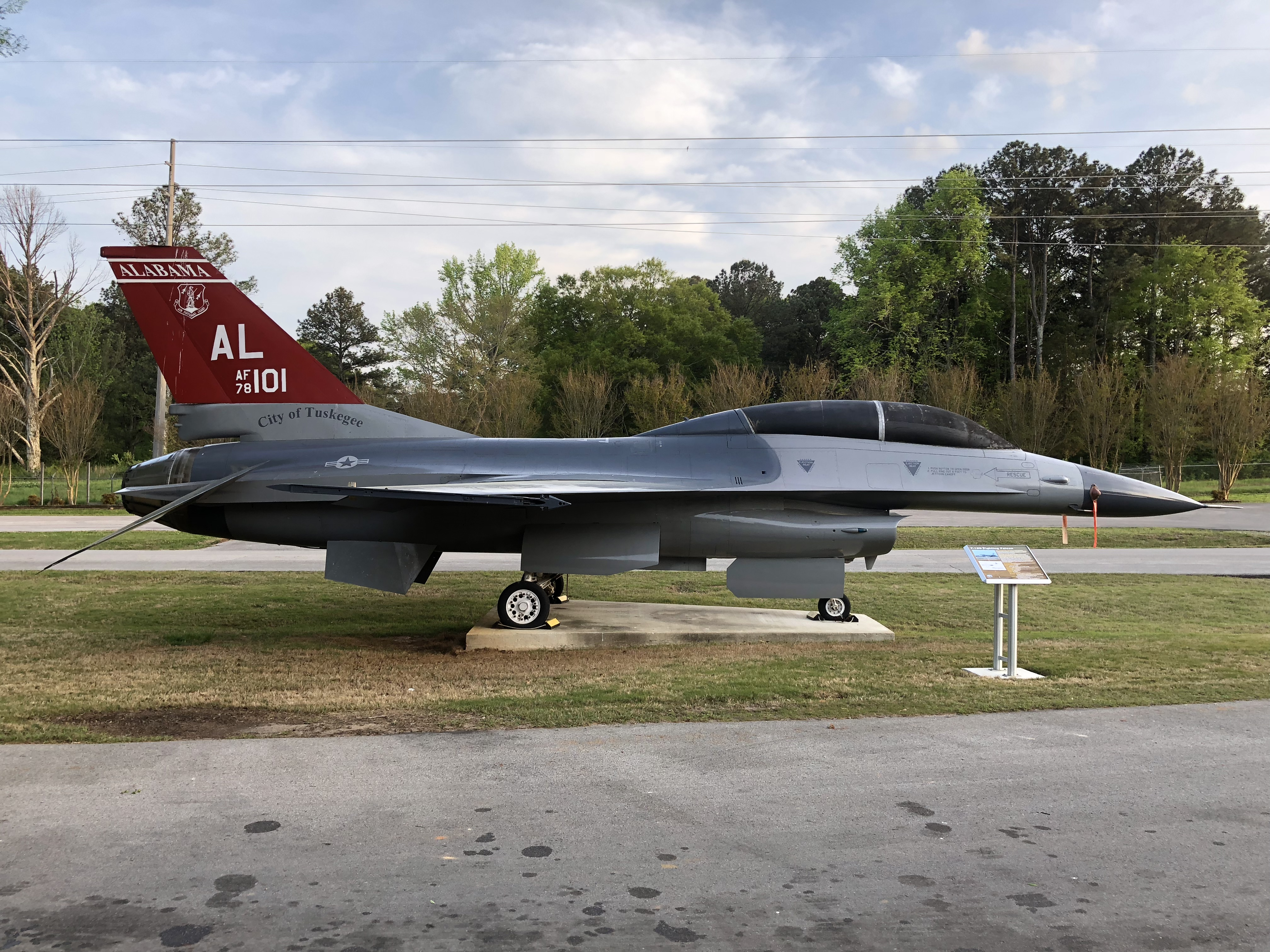
A General Dynamics F-16B Fighting Falcon on display at the Aviation Challenge campus of the U.S. Space & Rocket Center in Huntsville, Alabama; note its acknowledgement to the Tuskegee Airmen on its dorsal fin.

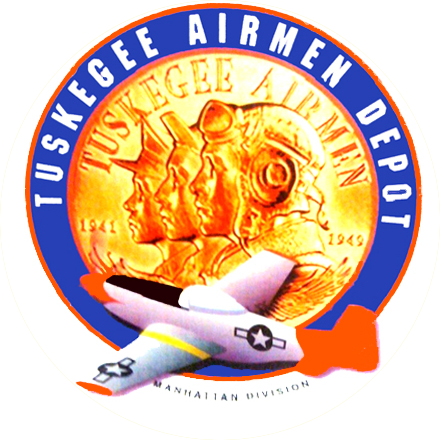
The new redesigned Tuskegee Airmen Depot sticker.

On 29 March 2007, the Tuskegee Airmen were collectively awarded a Congressional Gold Medal at a ceremony in the U.S. Capitol rotunda. The medal is currently on display at the Smithsonian Institution. The airfield where the airmen trained is now the Tuskegee Airmen National Historic Site.

Thurgood Marshall, the future Supreme Court justice, got his start defending Tuskegee bomber trainees. The 477th Bombardment Group was formed in 1944 to extend the so-called "Tuskegee experiment" by allowing black aviators to serve on bomber crews. The aim was to send pilots—many of them veterans of the original Tuskegee fighter group—back to the States for training on B-25 bombers. While in Indiana, some of the African-American officers were arrested and charged with mutiny after entering an all-white officers' club. Marshall, then a young lawyer, represented the 100 black officers who had landed in jail as a result of the confrontation. The men were soon released (although one was later convicted of violent conduct and fined).

Robert W. Williams Jr., a navigator/bombardier in the 477th Bombardment Group, became a judge in the First Judicial District, Commonwealth of Pennsylvania. In 1979, he was elected to the Commonwealth Court, an appellate court, and the first African American to serve on that court. In 1985, he resigned from the court to run for the District Attorney of Philadelphia County. He was the first African American to successfully become a city-wide candidate for that office. On 3 July 2023, Williams reached the age of 100, making him one of the last Tuskegee Airmen alive.

Other members of the Tuskegee Airmen have made contributions in the world of business. Eugene Winslow founded Afro-Am Publishing in Chicago, Illinois, which published Great Negroes Past and Present in 1963.

Daniel "Chappie" James Jr. started his career in the early 1940s at Tuskegee, joining the Army Air Corps in July 1943. After the war ended, James stayed in what became the Air Force and flew missions in both Korea and Vietnam. In 1969, James was put in command of Wheelus Air Base outside of Tripoli.

Four Tuskegee airmen went on to become generals. For keeping his cool in the face of Qaddafi's troops, James was appointed a brigadier general by President Nixon. He was not the only Tuskegee graduate to make flag rank. James followed in the footsteps of Benjamin O. Davis Jr., the original commander of the 332nd Fighter Group and the first black general in the U.S. Air Force. Another Tuskegee aviator, Lucius Theus, retired a major general after dedicating most of his 36-year career in the Air Force to improving the military's bureaucracy, helping to implement a direct deposit system for service members. In 2019, at 100 years of age, Colonel Charles McGee was promoted to honorary Brigadier General.

Coleman Young served in the 477th Medium-Bomber Group of the as a second lieutenant, bombardier, and navigator. As a lieutenant in the 477th, Young played a role in the Freeman Field Mutiny in 1945. Young later was elected mayor of Detroit, MI and served from 1974 to 1994. Young was the first African-American mayor of Detroit.

In 2006, California Congressman Adam Schiff and Missouri Congressman William Lacy Clay Jr., led the initiative to create a commemorative postage stamp to honor the Tuskegee Airmen.

The 99th Flying Training Squadron flies T-1A Jayhawks and, in honor of the Tuskegee Airmen, painted the tops of the tails of their aircraft red. On 1 August 2008, Camp Creek Parkway, a portion of State Route 6 in south Fulton County and in the City of East Point near Atlanta, Georgia, was officially renamed in honor of the Tuskegee Airmen. The road is a highway that serves as the main artery into Hartsfield-Jackson International Airport.

The Heinz History Center in Pittsburgh presented an award to several Western Pennsylvania Tuskegee veterans, as well as suburban Sewickley, Pennsylvania dedicated a memorial to the seven from that municipality. An exhibit was established at Pittsburgh International Airport in Concourse A.

On 9 December 2008, the Tuskegee Airmen were invited to attend the inauguration of Barack Obama, the first African-American elected as president. Retired Lt. William Broadwater, 82, of Upper Marlboro, Maryland, a Tuskegee Airman, summed up the feeling. "The culmination of our efforts and others was this great prize we were given on 4 Nov.. Now we feel like we've completed our mission." More than 180 airmen attended the inauguration on 20 January 2009.

In July 2009, 15-year-old Kimberly Anyadike became the youngest female African-American pilot to complete a transcontinental flight across the United States. She cited the Tuskegee Airmen as one of her biggest inspirations, and was accompanied on her trip by 87-year-old former Tuskegee Airman Levi Thornhill.

The Tuskegee Airmen Memorial was erected at Walterboro Army Airfield, South Carolina, in honor of the Tuskegee Airmen, their instructors, and ground support personnel who trained at the Walterboro Army Airfield during World War II. In the 2010 Rose Parade, the city of West Covina, California paid tribute to the "service and commitment of the Tuskegee Airmen" with a float, entitled "Tuskegee Airmen—A Cut Above", which featured a large bald eagle, two replica World War II "Redtail" fighter aircraft and historical images of some of the airmen who served. The float won the mayor's trophy as the most outstanding city entry—national or international.

In June 1998, the Ohio Army and Air National Guard opened a jointly operated dining hall. They dedicated the new "Red Tail Dining Facility" to the Tuskegee Airmen. The facility is operated at the Rickenbacker ANG base outside of Columbus Ohio.

In 2008, the Tuskegee Airmen were inducted into the International Air & Space Hall of Fame at the San Diego Air & Space Museum.

In January 2012, MTA Regional Bus Operations officially changed the name of its 100th Street depot in New York City to the Tuskegee Airmen Depot. In 2012, George Lucas produced Red Tails, a film based on the experiences of the Tuskegee Airmen.

In November 2013, the New York City Council voted to permanently rename South Road in Jamaica, Queens to Tuskegee Airmen Way. The change took effect on November 14.

In 2012, Aldine Independent School District in Harris County, Texas named Benjamin O. Davis High School in honor of Benjamin O. Davis Jr.

On February 6, 2014, a 17-mile section of I-80 between Vacaville, CA and Davis, CA, near Travis Air Force Base, was named the "Tuskegee Airman Memorial Highway".

In December 2014, Interstate 75 in Michigan was named the "Tuskegee Airmen Memorial Highway".

On 16 September 2019, the USAF officially named the winning T-X program aircraft the "T-7A Red Hawk" as a tribute to the Tuskegee Airmen, who painted their airplanes' tails red, and to the Curtiss P-40 Warhawk, one of the aircraft flown by the Tuskegee Airmen.

On 2 February 2020, McGee brought out the commemorative coin for the Super Bowl coin flip.

In 2021, the United States Mint issued an America the Beautiful quarter commemorating the Tuskegee Airmen National Historic Site. The coin depicts a Tuskegee Airman suiting up with two P-51 Mustangs flying overhead and the motto "They fought two wars".

Two NASCAR teams have used special paint schemes on their cars emulating the Tuskegee Airmen's P-51s. B. J. McLeod raced the 2019 Coca-Cola 600 with a No. 53 car in honor of Tuskegee Airman Robert Friend. At the 2021 GEICO 500, Erik Jones led seven laps in an Air Force-sponsored No. 43 before crashing.

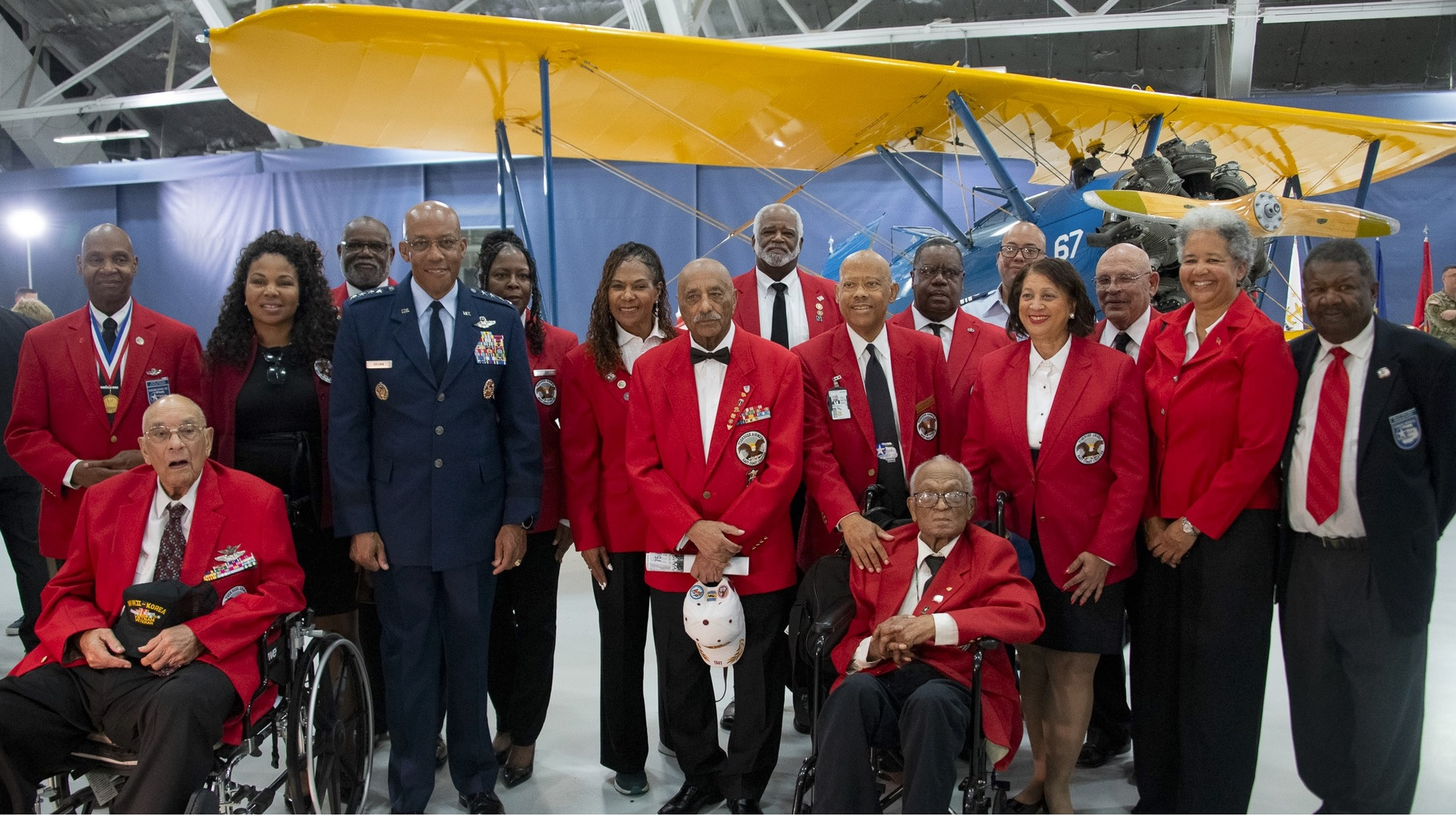
Tuskegee Airmen at the Aircraft Exchange ceremony July 26, 2023

A commemoration of the 75th anniversary of the official desegregation of the US military during which several Tuskegee Airmen were present was held on 26 July 2023 at Joint Base Andrews in Maryland. During the event, a PT-17 Stearman was officially inducted to the National Museum of the Air Force, located at Wright-Patterson AFB in Ohio. Most Tuskegee pilots were originally trained on the Stearman-class aircraft.

In 2023, the Pentagon identified the remains of 2nd Lt. Fred L. Brewer Jr of the 100th Fighter Squadron, 332nd Fighter Group, whose P-51C Mustang crashed during a bomber escort mission over Regensburg Germany in October 1944. After Lt. Brewer's plane crashed he was declared missing in action. In July 2023, the Defense POW/MIA Accounting Agency (DPAA) exhumed a set of previously unidentified remains and positively identified them through lab tests as belonging to Brewer. He was laid to rest with military honors at Salisbury National Cemetery in his home state of North Carolina.

On 28 March 2024, President Joe Biden issued a national letter to recognize Tuskegee Airmen Commemoration Day. Congresswomen Lisa Blunt Rochester and Eleanor Holmes Norton, along with Vanessa Butler in partnership with the East Coast Chapter Tuskegee Airmen Incorporated and Tuskegee Airmen Incorporated, spearheaded the recognition process. Tuskegee Airmen Commemoration Day is typically celebrated on the fourth Thursday in March annually.

In January 2025, United States Air Force lesson plans and training courses, which included some videos of the Tuskegee Airmen, were suspended in compliance with the Trump administration's anti-DEI orders. The suspension was not because of the Tuskegee Airmen videos, rather the course contained other material specific to a DEI program, separate from the Tuskegee Airmen videos. Shortly after, secretary of Defense Pete Hegseth tweeted his support for reinstatement of the Tuskegee videos. The videos were soon reintroduced, though the other class material was changed to comply with the Trump administration's executive orders.

== Artistic depictions ==
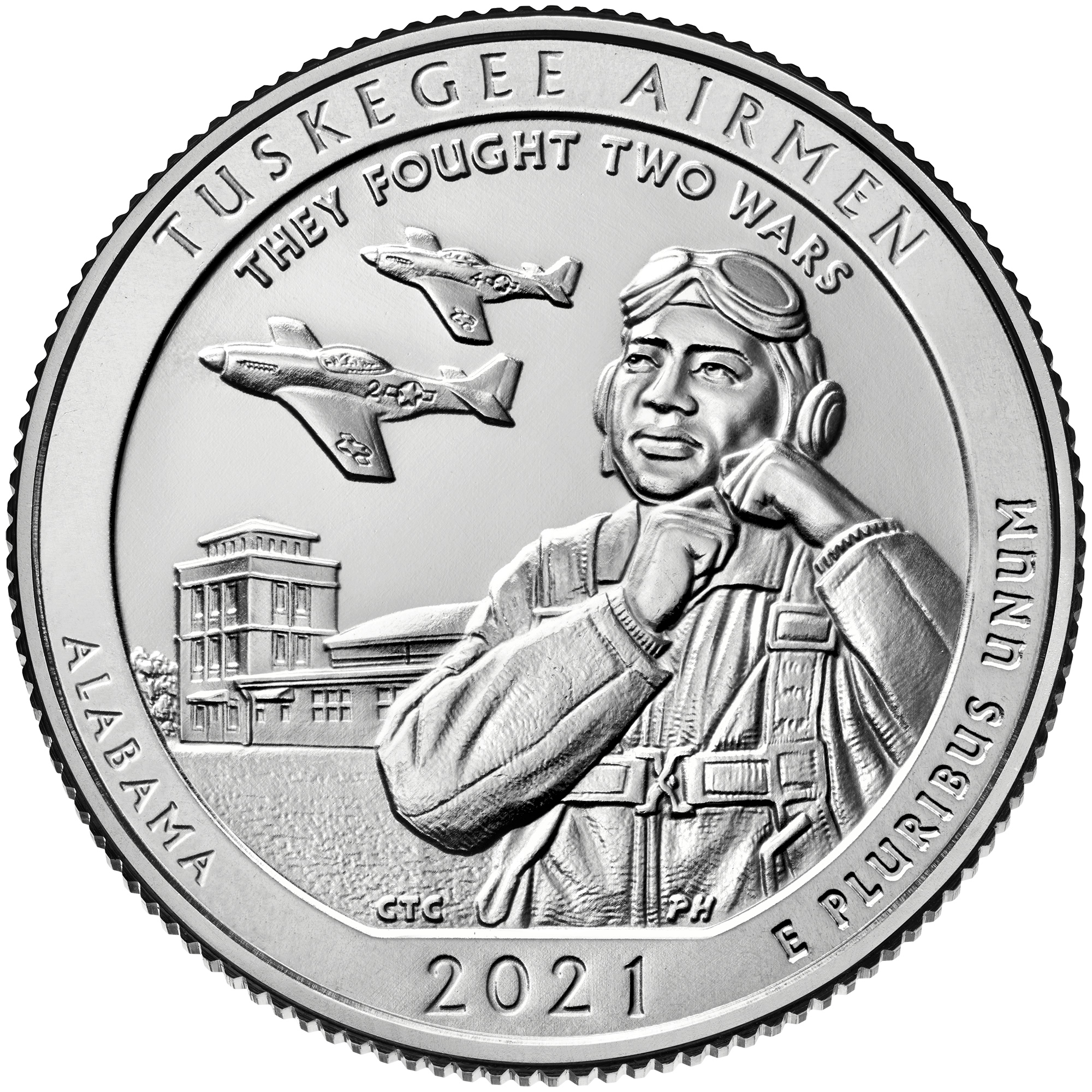
The reverse of Alabama's 2021 America the Beautiful quarter depicts a Tuskegee airman.

- The Legend of the Red Tails, by artist Ray Simon is displayed in the Tuskegee Airmen National Historical Museum.
- Red Tails Escorting the B17s, a watercolor by Kay Smith is in the collections of the Pritzker Military Museum & Library.
- There is a mural depicting the Tuskegee Airmen and their contributions at 39th and Chestnut Streets in Philadelphia, Pennsylvania.
- Tuskegee Airmen, a watercolor mural by Andrew J. Woodstock has been displayed at the Air Zoo Aerospace and Aviation Museum in Portage, Michigan.
- Richmond, Kentucky's seven Tuskegee Airmen who served during World War II are honored with an artist's rendering of airman Frank D. Walker at the Madison County Public Library.

== In popular culture ==
Tuskegee Airmen were featured in Wings for This Man (1945)

- The Homestead Grays (1978), a wartime novel by James Wylie, loosely based on the combat exploits of the 99th Pursuit Squadron and the 332nd Fighter Group.
- Wings for This Man (1945), a propaganda short about the Tuskegee Airmen, was produced by the First Motion Picture Unit of the Army Air Forces. The film was narrated by Ronald Reagan.
- "Graveyard", an episode of Twelve O'Clock High (1966), starring Ossie Davis, Jon Voight, Lloyd Haynes.
- The Tuskegee Airmen (1995), a film starring Laurence Fishburne, Andre Braugher, Cuba Gooding, Jr, and John Lithgow was produced and aired by HBO.
- "The Tuskegee Airmen", a season two episode of the documentary TV series Dogfights, was originally aired on the History Channel on 6 December 2007.
- The Tuskegee Airmen (1997) are represented in the G.I. Joe action figure series.
- The Wild Blue: The Men and Boys who Flew the B-24s over Germany (2001), a book by Stephen Ambrose, describes the Tuskegee Airmen in a tribute to their achievements.
- Silver Wings & Civil Rights: The Fight to Fly (2004) is a documentary that was the first film to feature information regarding the "Freeman Field Mutiny", the struggle of 101 African-American officers arrested for entering a white officer's club.
- Red Tail Reborn is a documentary film about the restoration of an aircraft that was flown by the Tuskegee Airmen and its use as a flying memorial to them.
- Red Tails is a film about the Tuskegee Airmen produced by Lucasfilm and released in January 2012. The film was written by John Ridley and Aaron McGruder, and directed by Anthony Hemingway.
- Night at the Museum: Battle of the Smithsonian (2009) features the Tuskegee Airmen. One of the Airmen, played by Keith Powell, narrates the group's activities in a stentorian voice ("The Tuskegee Airmen are on the march once again!"). Another one of the Airmen (Craig Robinson) says to Amelia Earhart (Amy Adams), "A lot of people didn't think we could fly, either ... thanks for clearing the runway for us."
- Black Angels Over Tuskegee (2014), was an Off-Broadway play in New York City about the Airmen written and directed by Layon Gray. Performances ended on November 15, 2014.
- The story of one such airman is retold in the 1949 radio drama "Last Letter Home" presented by Destination Freedom.
- Masters of the Air (2024) is a nine-episode mini-series featuring the Tuskegee Airmen on Apple TV and produced by Gary Goetzman, Tom Hanks, and Steven Spielberg.

== Squadron images ==
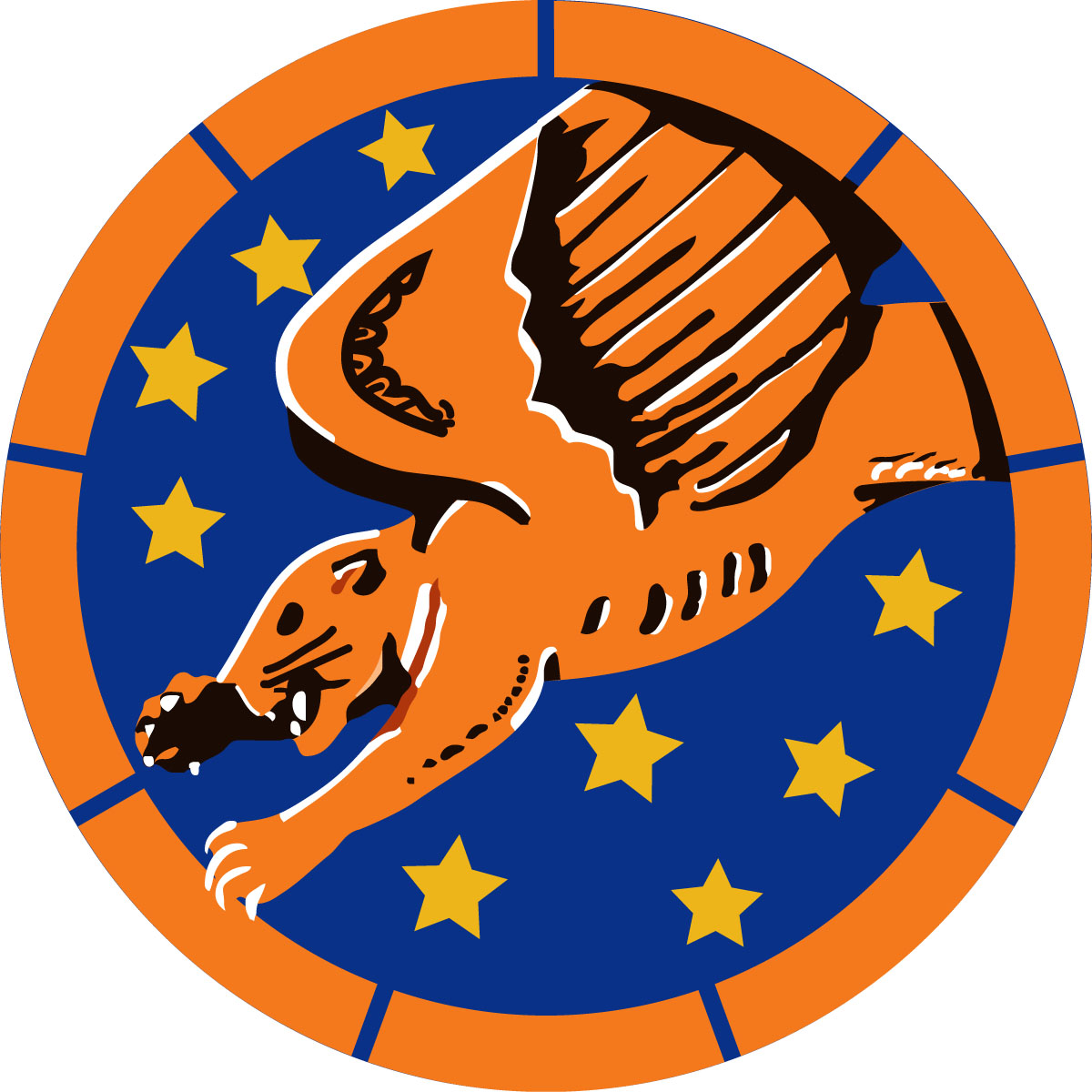
Patch of the 99th Fighter Squadron

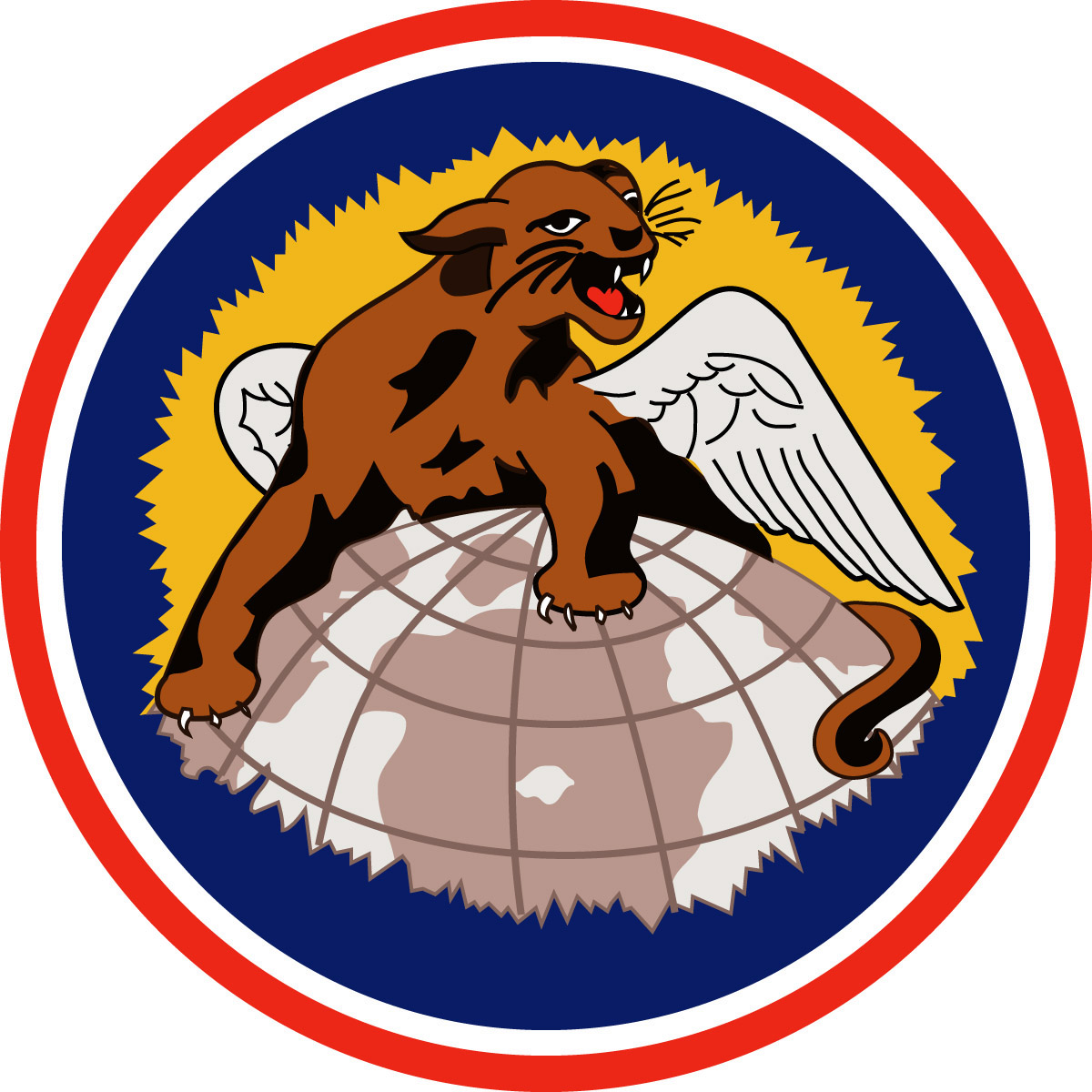
Patch of the 100th Fighter Squadron

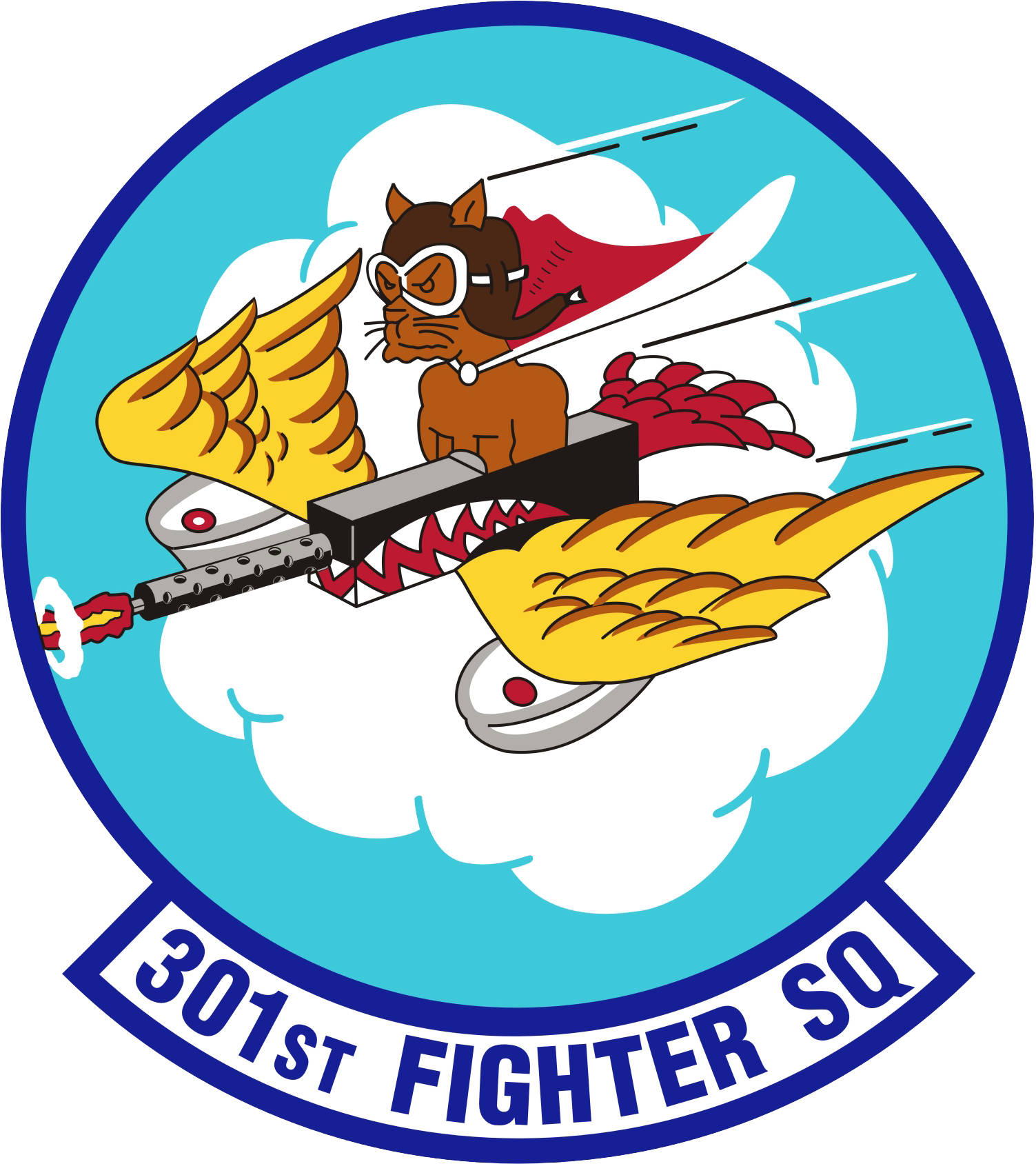
Patch of the 301st Fighter Squadron

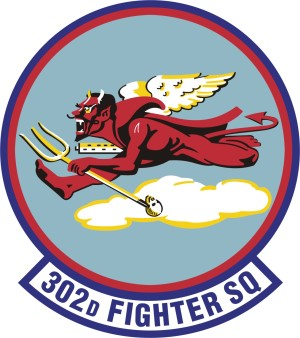
Patch of the 302d Fighter Squadron

== See also ==
- 92nd Infantry Division
- 93rd Infantry Division
- 555th Parachute Infantry Battalion "Triple Nickle"
- 761st Tank Battalion
- Bessie Coleman – first African-American civil aviator
- Fly (2009 play about the Tuskegee Airmen)
- List of African-American Medal of Honor recipients
- List of Tuskegee Airmen
- List of Tuskegee Airmen Cadet Pilot Graduation Classes, 1942–1946, listing graduating Cadet Pilots by Class, Year and Class Type
- Military history of African-Americans
- Racial discrimination against African-Americans in the U.S. Military
- Red Ball Express
- Strategic bombing during World War II
- Port Chicago disaster
- Walterboro Army Airfield training site and memorial
- Willa Brown
