= List of Tuskegee Airmen =

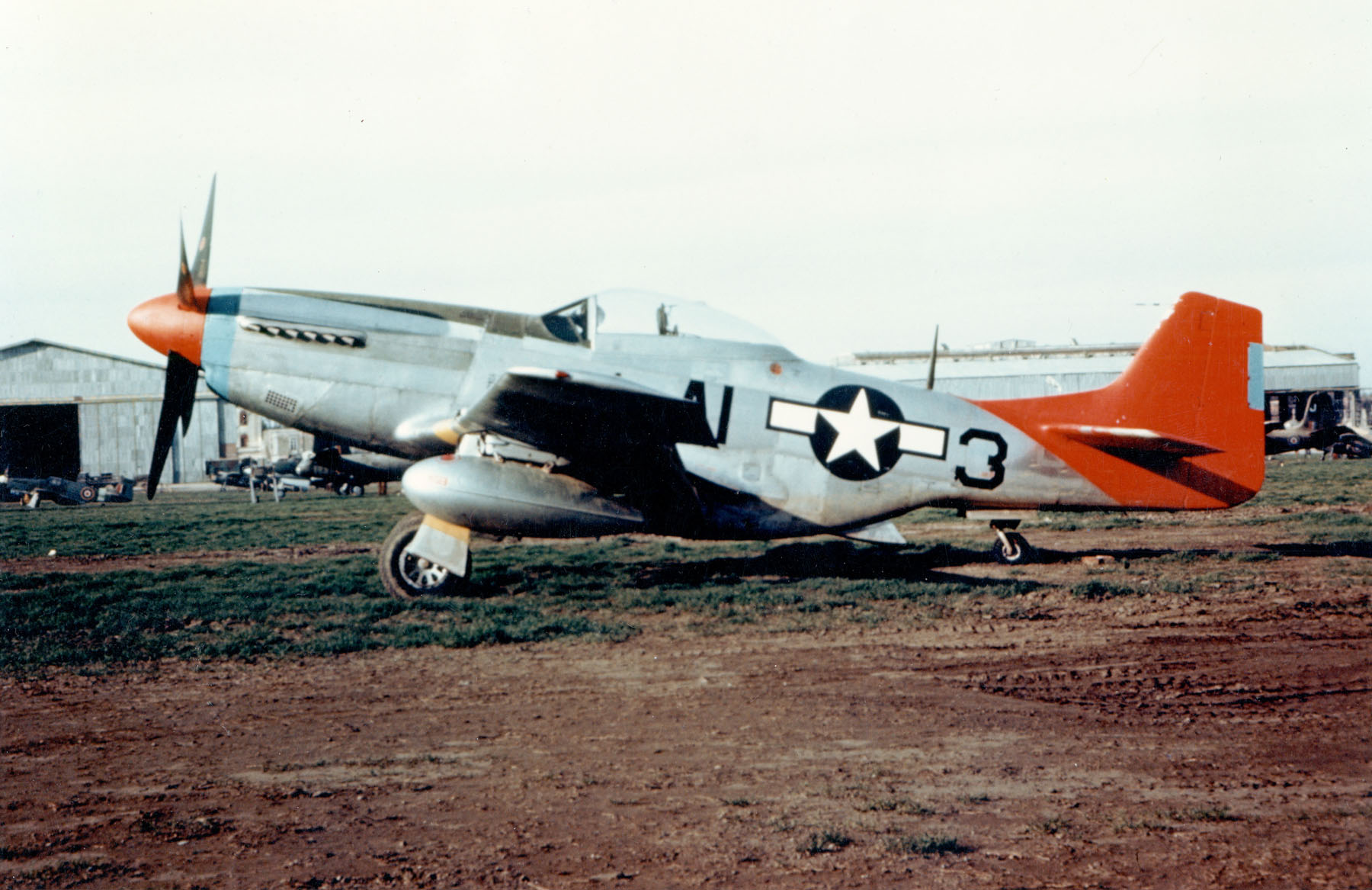
The Tuskegee Airmen's aircraft had a distinctive tail that led to the name, "Red Tails." (Note: The red markings that distinguished the Tuskegee Airmen included red bands on the noses of P-51s as well as a red rudder; their P-51B and D Mustangs flew with similar color schemes, with red propeller spinners, yellow wing bands and all-red tail surfaces.)

This list of Tuskegee Airmen contains the names of notable Tuskegee Airmen, who were a group of primarily African-American military pilots (fighter and bomber) and airmen who fought in World War II. The name also applies to the navigators, bombardiers, mechanics, instructors, crew chiefs, nurses, cooks and other support personnel. They were collectively awarded the Congressional Gold Medal in 2006.

There are 1,007 documented Tuskegee Airmen Pilots. For a complete list of graduate cadet pilots, see the List of Tuskegee Airmen Cadet Pilot Graduation Classes.

== A ==
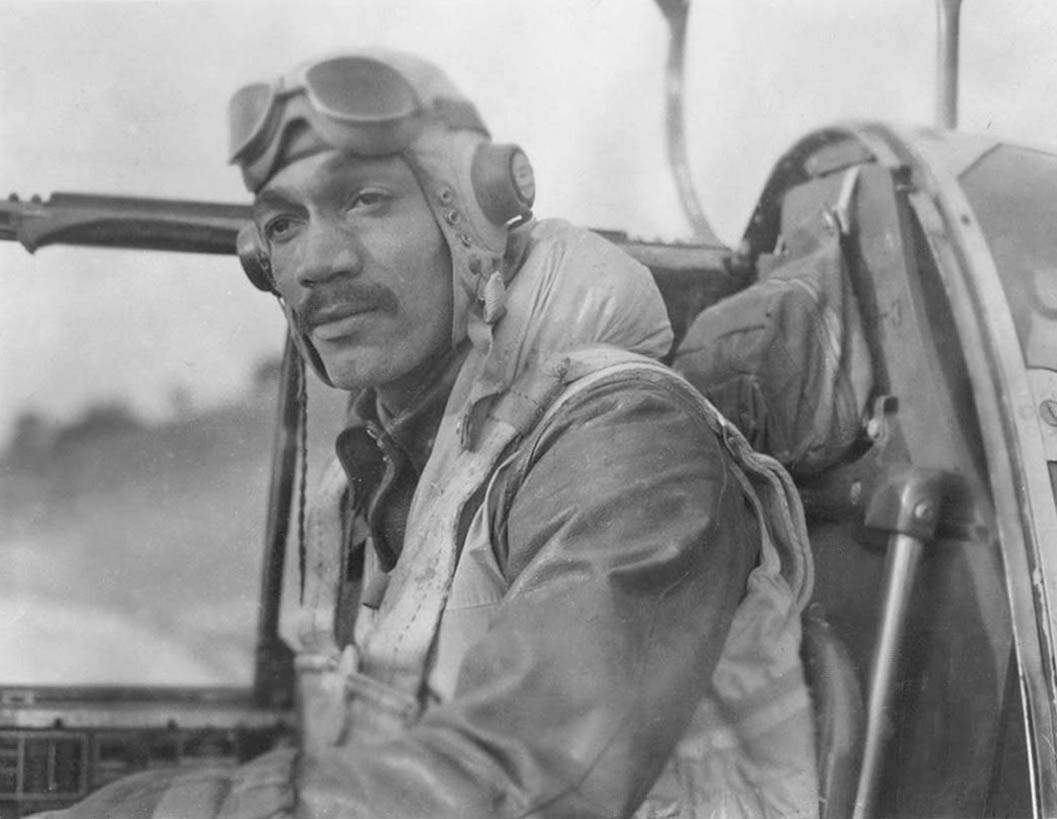
Lee Archer WW2

- Paul Adams (P/AC)
- Rutherford H. Adkins (P/AC)
- Halbert Alexander (P/AC)
- William N. Alsbrook (P/AC)
- C. Alfred "Chief" Anderson (P/AC) (SS)
- Charles E. Anderson (OFS)
- William Armstrong †
- Lee Archer (P/AC)
- Robert Ashby (P/AC)
- Willie Ashley (P/AC)

== B ==
- Charles P. Bailey (P/AC)
- Herman A. Barnett (P/AC)
- William Bartley (P/AC)
- LeRoy Battle (P/AC)
- Howard Baugh (P/AC)
- Henry Cabot Lodge Bohler (P/AC)
- George R. Bolling (P/AC)
- John Branch (PFC)
- Randolph Bromery (P/AC)
- George L. Brown (P/AC)
- Harold Brown (POW)
- Roscoe C. Brown Jr. (P/AC) (C/O)
- Charles M. Bussey (P/AC)
- Cyril Byron (SS)

== C ==
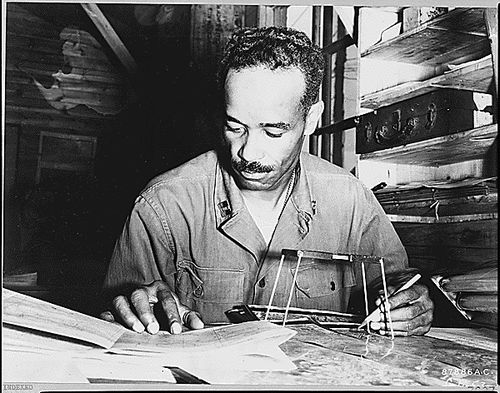
Eugene Calvin Cheatham 1951

- William A. Campbell (P/AC)
- Herbert Carter (P/AC)
- Mildred Hemmons Carter (OFS)
- Raymond Cassagnol (P/AC)
- Eugene Calvin Cheatham Jr. (P/AC)
- Herbert V. Clark (WIA)
- Granville C. Coggs (P/AC)
- John W. V. Cordice (SS)
- Otis Cowley
- Charles Crenchaw (P/AC)
- Milton Crenchaw (P/AC)
- Woodrow Crockett (P/AC)
- Lemuel R. Custis (P/AC)

== D ==
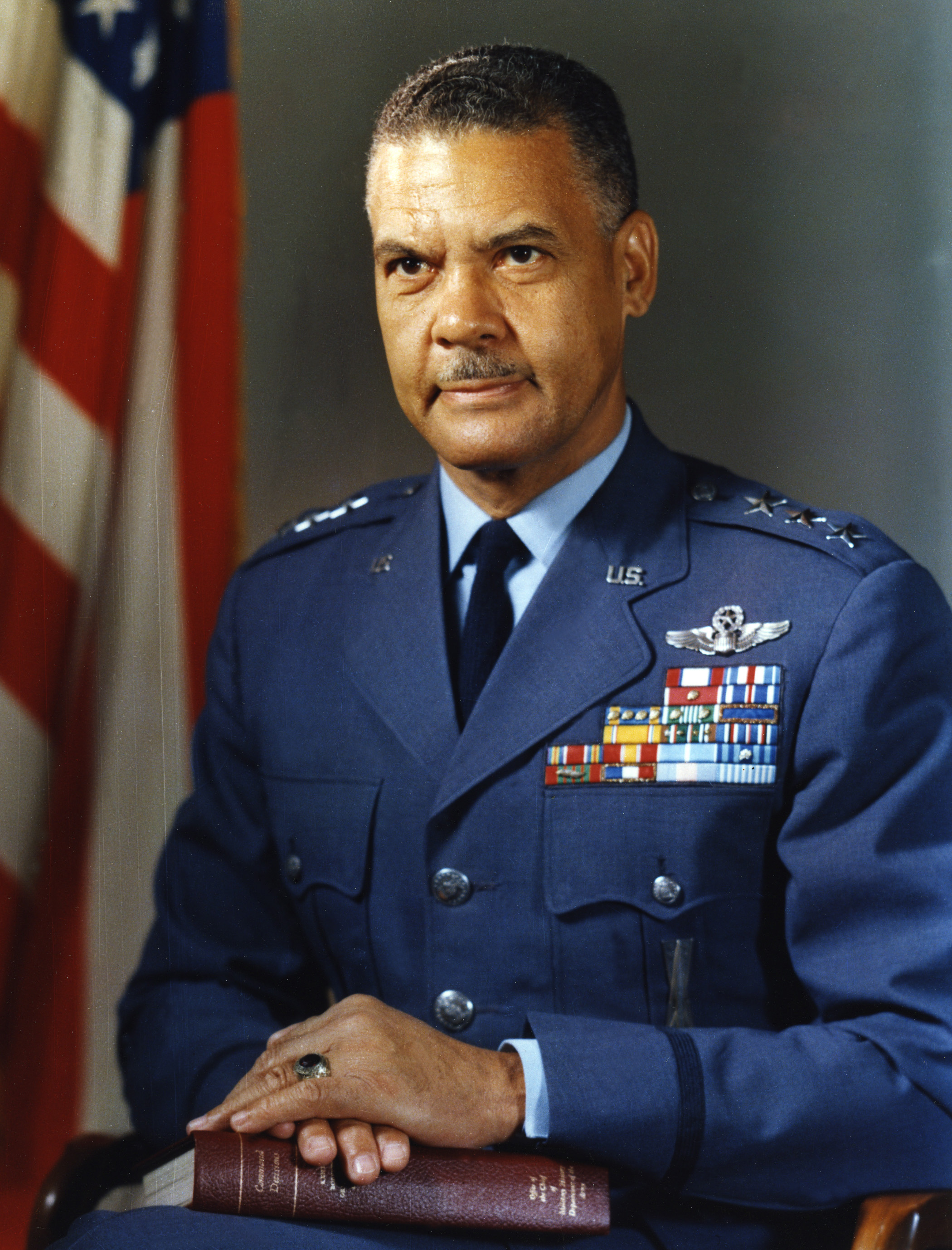
Benjamin O. Davis Jr.

- Clarence Dart (WIA)
- Alfonza W. Davis (MIA) (WIA)
- Benjamin O. Davis Jr. (C/O)
- Charles DeBow (P/AC)
- Wilfred DeFour (OFS)
- Robert W. Deiz (P/AC)
- Gene Derricotte (P/AC)
- Arque Dickerson (P/AC)
- Lawrence Dickson †
- Elwood T. Driver (P/AC)
- Charles W. Dryden (P/AC)
- Irma Dryden (SS)

== E ==
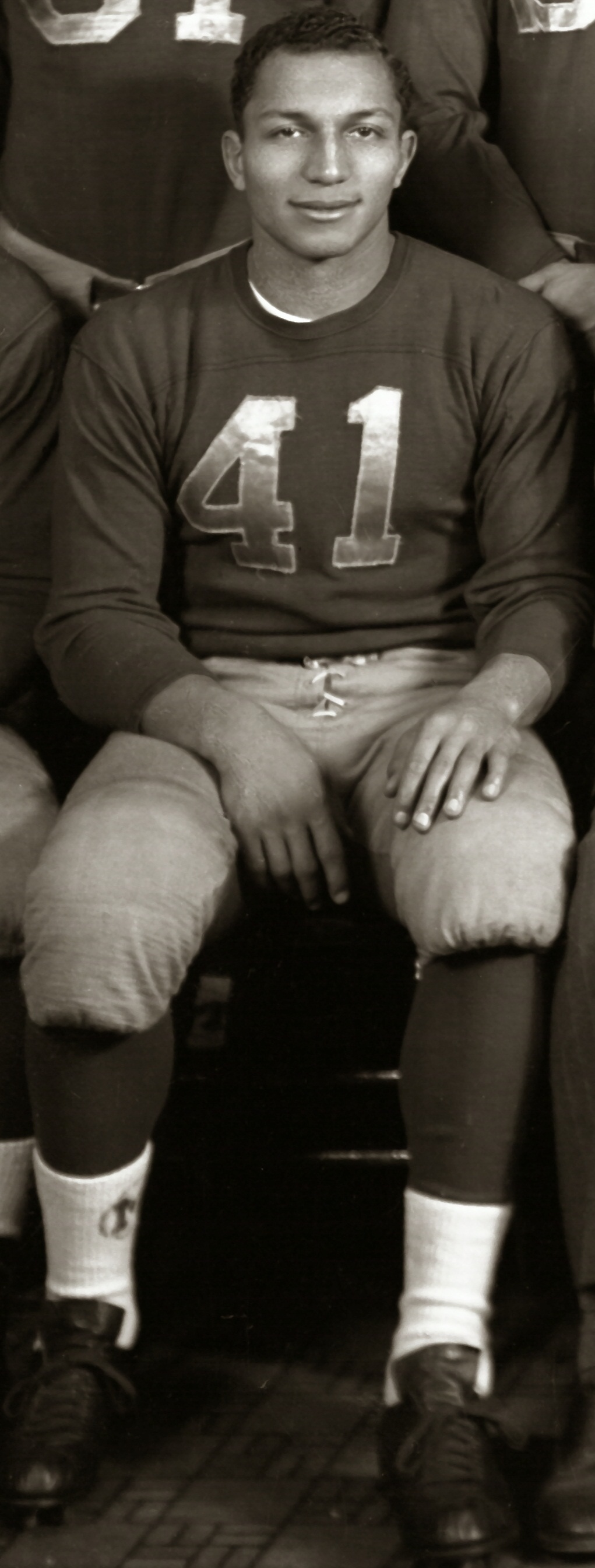
Gene Derricotte (1948)

- Wilson V. Eagleson (P/AC)
- John Ellis Edwards (P/AC)
- Leslie Edwards Jr. (OFS)
- Thomas Ellis (OFS)
- Joseph Elsberry (P/AC)
- Chauncey Eskridge (P/AC)

== F ==
- James Clayton Flowers (P/AC)
- Earl N. Franklin (P/AC)
- Julius Freeman (SS)
- Robert Friend (P/AC)
- Willie H. Fuller (P/AC)

== G ==
- Edward C. Gleed (P/AC)
- Joseph Gomer (P/AC)
- Alfred Gorham (POW)
- Oliver Goodall (P/AC)

== H ==
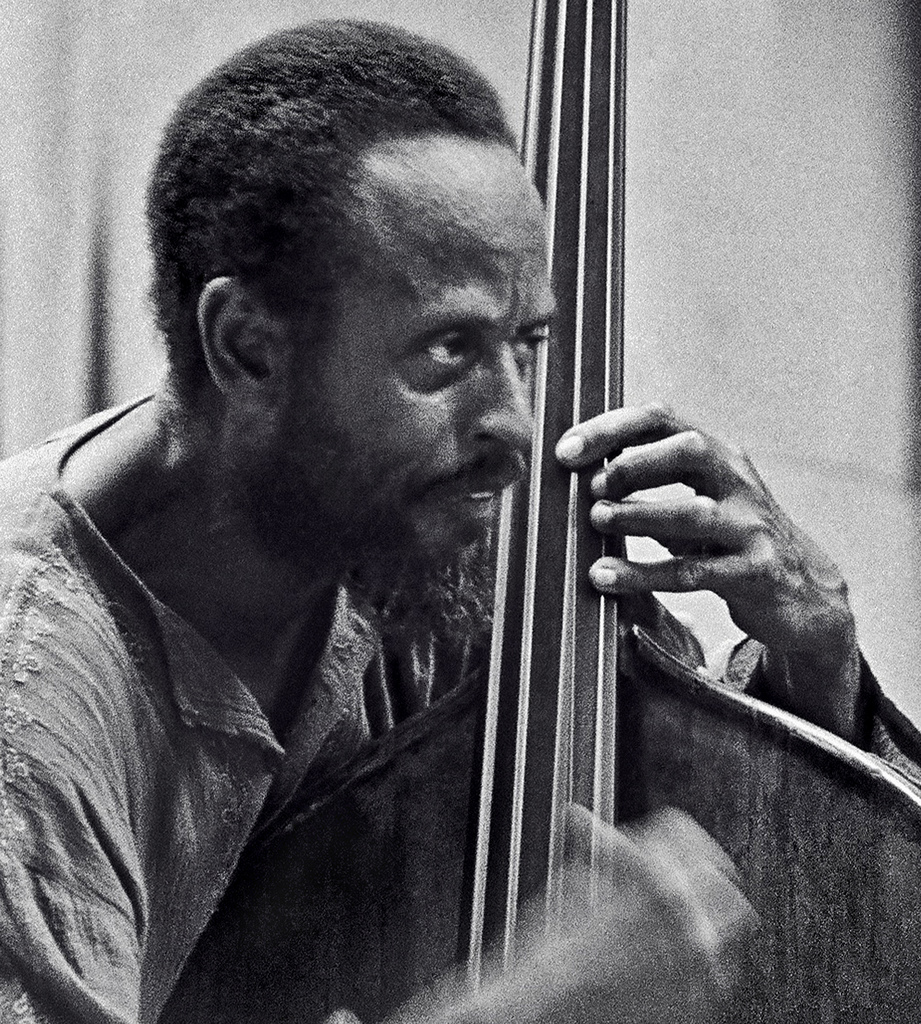
Percy Heath

- Charles B. Hall (P/AC)
- Herbert Hardesty (OFS)
- Herbert Heywood
- George Hardy (P/AC)
- Richard H. Harris (P/AC)
- James H. Harvey (P/AC)
- Raymond V. Haysbert (OFS)
- Vernon V. Haywood (C/O)
- Percy Heath (P/AC)
- Maycie Herrington (SS)
- Mitchell Higginbotham (P/AC)
- William H. Holloman (P/AC)
- LeRoy Homer Jr. (H)
- Harold K. Hoskins (P/AC)
- Esteban Hotesse (P/AC)
- Lincoln Hudson (POW)

== I ==
- George J. Iles (POW)

== J ==
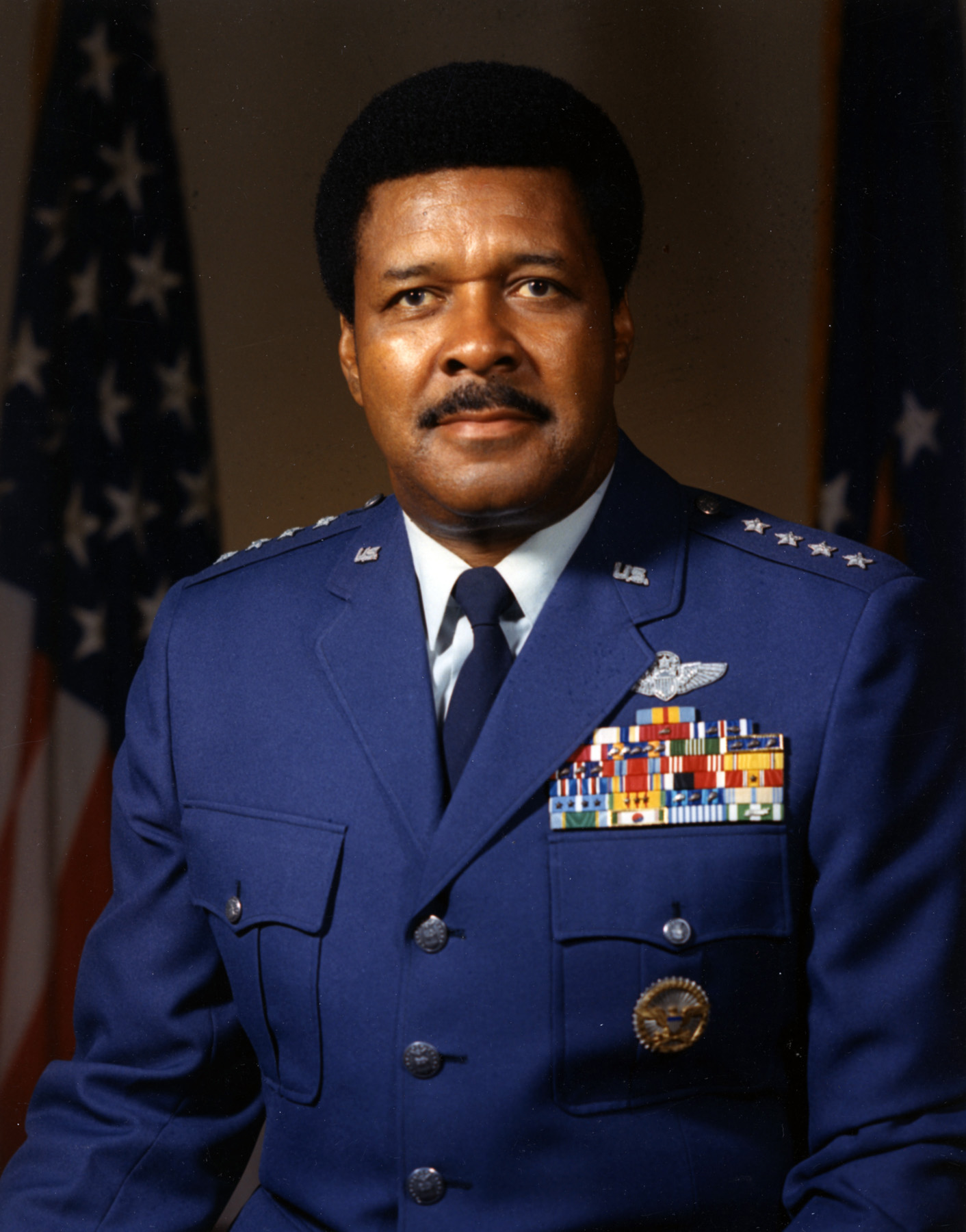
Daniel James Jr. (Chappie)

- Eugene B. Jackson (OFS)
- Daniel "Chappie" James Jr. (P/AC) (SS)
- Clarence C. Jamison (P/AC)
- Alexander Jefferson (POW) (WIA)
- Buford A. Johnson (OFS)
- Carl C. Johnson (P/AC)
- Herman A. Johnson (OFS)
- Theodore Johnson (OFS)

== K ==
- Paul F. Keene Jr. (P/AC)
- James Johnson Kelly (P/AC)
- James B. Knighten (P/AC)
- George L. Knox II (P/AC)

== L ==
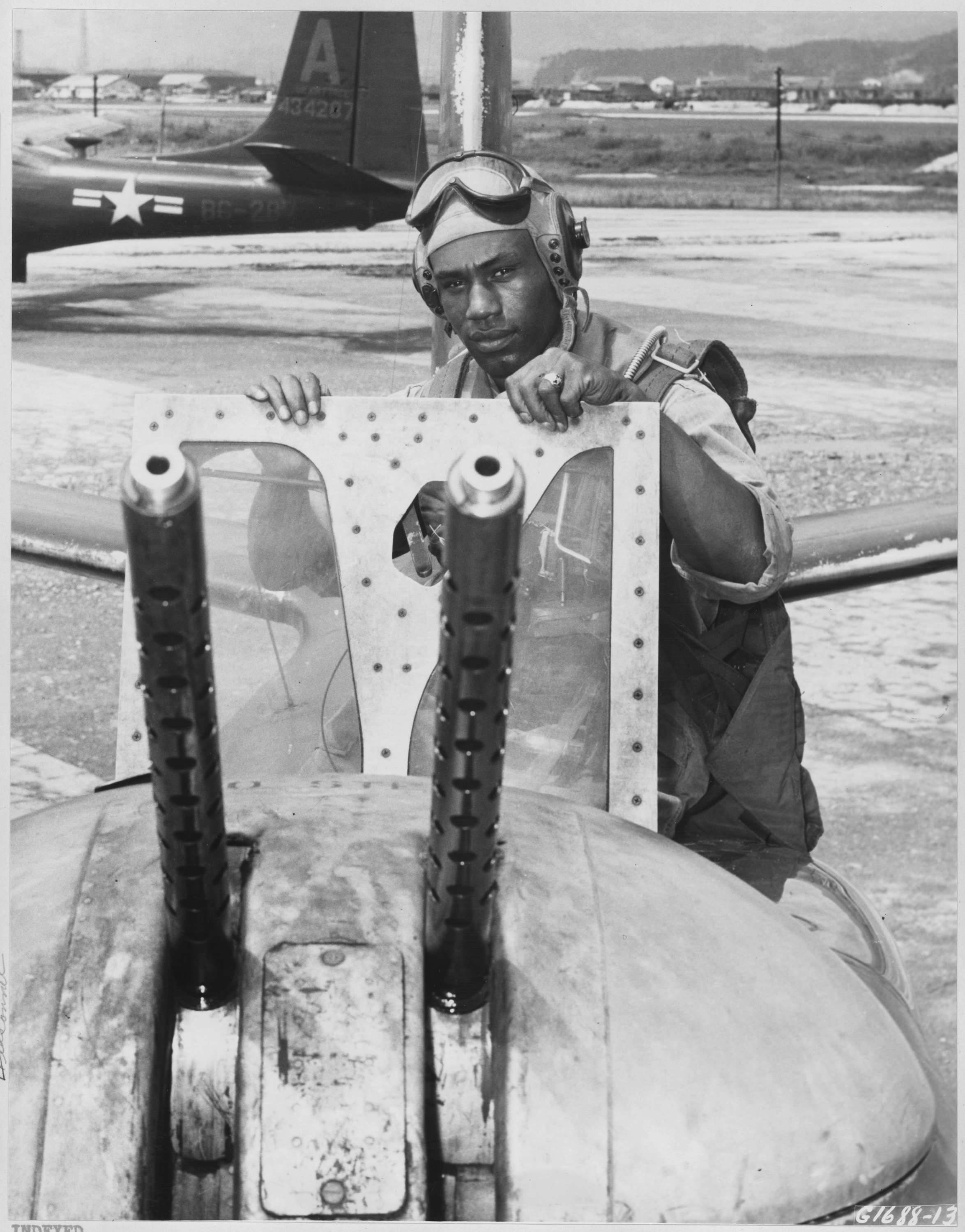
Charles W. Ledbetter in Korea, July 1951

- Roy E. LaGrone
- Herman A. Lawson (P/AC)
- Walter I. Lawson (P/AC)
- Norvel Lee (P/AC)
- Ulysses Lee (P/AC)
- Wilmore B. Leonard (P/AC)
- Clarence D. Lester (P/AC)
- Theodore Lumpkin Jr (OFS)
- John Lyle (P/AC)

== M ==
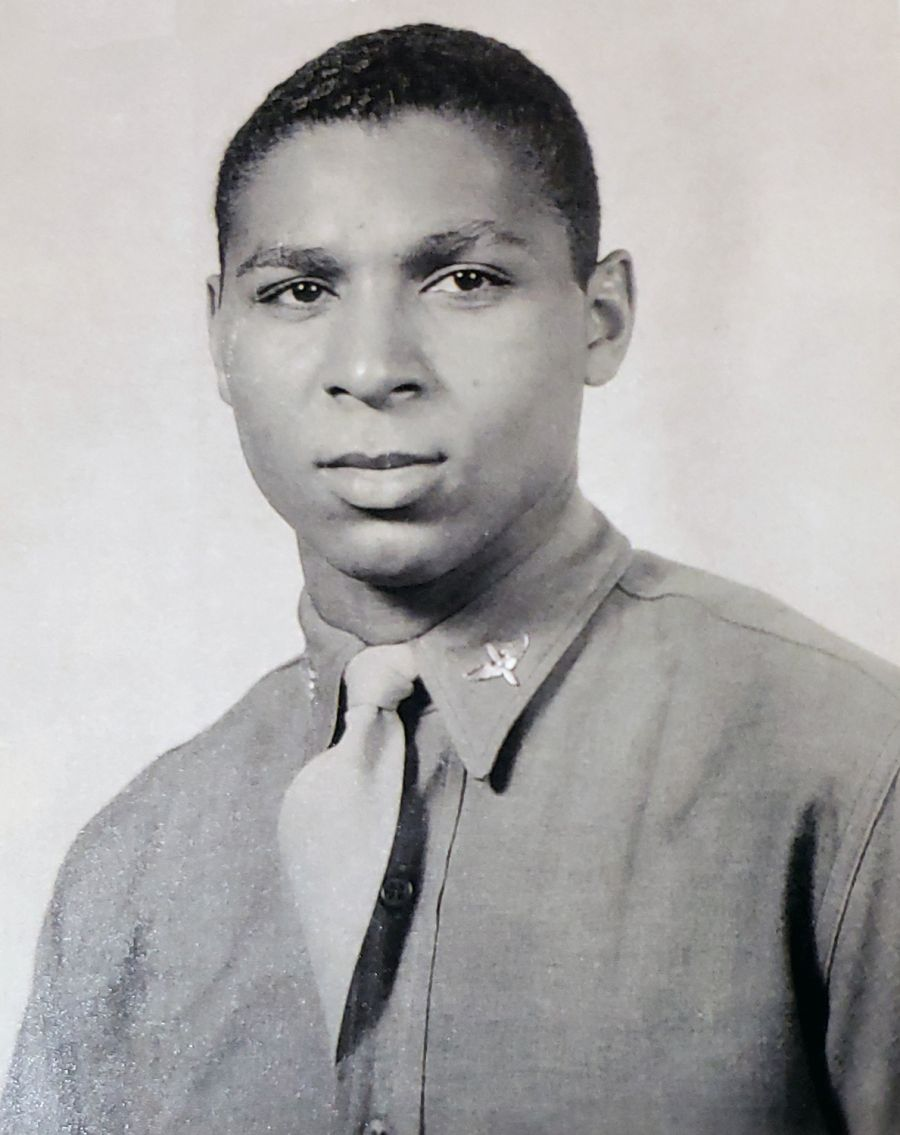
Robert Martin Tuskegee Airman

- Frank Mann (SS)
- Hiram Mann (P/AC)
- Walter Manning (POW) †
- August Harvey Martin (P/AC)
- Walter L. McCreary (POW)
- Armour G. McDaniel
- Charles McGee (P/AC)
- John "Mule" Miles
- Dabney Montgomery (P/AC)
- John Mosley (P/AC)

== N ==
- Fitzroy Newsum (P/AC)

== P ==
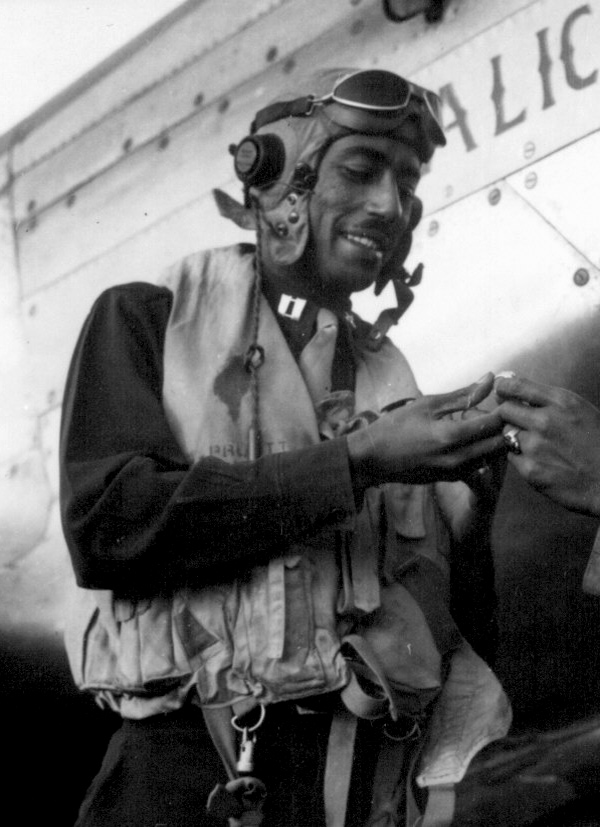
Wendell O. Pruitt Tuskegee Airman

- Noel F. Parrish (P/AC) (SS) (C/O)
- Alix Pasquet (P/AC)
- Robert P. Patterson (SS)
- James O. Plinton Jr. (P/AC) (SS)
- Wendell O. Pruitt (P/AC)
- Louis R. Purnell Sr. (P/AC) (SS)
- Norman Proctor Flt. Officer

== R ==
- Lincoln Ragsdale (P/AC)
- Della H. Raney (SS)
- Wallace P. Reed (OFS)
- Emmett J. Rice
- Price D. Rice (P/AC)
- Virgil J. Richardson
- George S. Roberts (P/AC) (C/O)
- Lawrence E. Roberts (P/AC) (SS)
- Curtis C. Robinson (P/AC)
- Isaiah Edward Robinson Jr. (P/AC)
- John C. Robinson (P/AC)
- Marion Rodgers (P/AC)
- John W. Rogers Sr. (P/AC)
- Willie Rogers (WIA)
- Mac Ross (P/FC) (C/O)
- Robert R. Rowland (SS)

== S ==
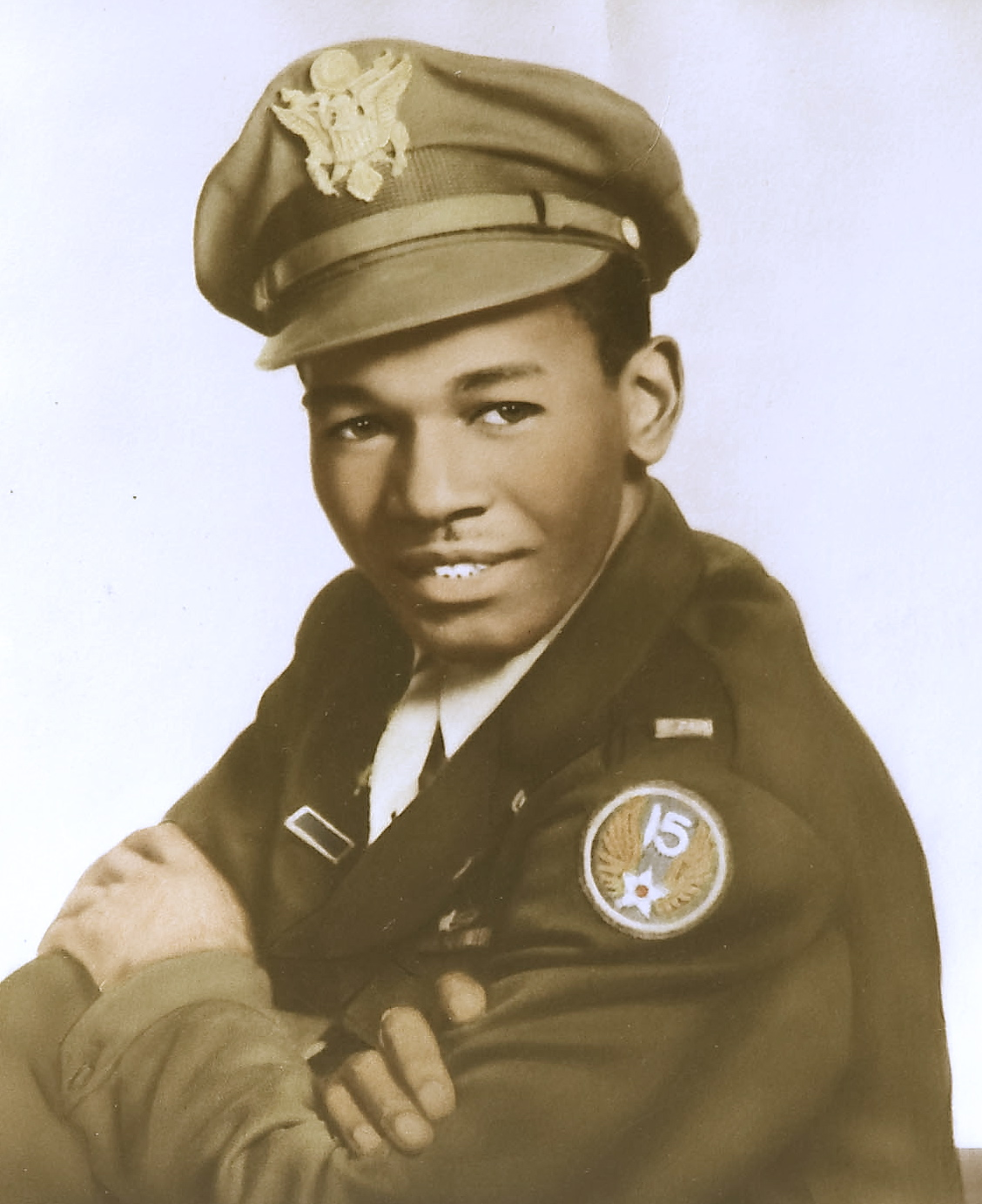
1st Lt. Calvin J. Spann an Original Tuskegee Airmen of the 332nd Fighter Group 100th Squadron

- Robert Searcy (OFS)
- Robert Selway (C/O)
- David Showell (P/AC)
- Wilmeth Sidat-Singh (P/AC)
- Eugene Smith (P/AC) (SS)
- Graham Smith †
- Quentin P. Smith (P/AC)
- Calvin J. Spann (P/AC)
- Vernon Sport (P/AC)
- Lowell Steward (P/AC)
- Harry Stewart, Jr. (P/AC)
- Charles "Chuck" Stone Jr. (P/AC)
- Percy Sutton (OFS)

== T ==
- Alva Temple (P/AC)
- Roger Terry (P/AC)
- Lucius Theus (SS)
- Edward L. Toppins (P/AC)
- Robert B. Tresville (MIA)
- Andrew D. Turner (P/AC) (C/O)

== U ==
- Regis F. A. Urschler (H)

== V ==
- Thomas Franklin Vaughns (OFS)

== W ==
- George Watson (SS)
- Spann Watson (P/AC)
- Luke J. Weathers (P/AC)
- Shelby Westbrook (P/AC)
- Sherman W. White †
- John L. Whitehead Jr. (P/AC)
- Malvin "Mal" Whitfield (P/AC)
- Yenwith K. Whitney (P/AC)
- James T. Wiley (P/AC)
- Oscar Lawton Wilkerson (P/AC)
- Leonard R. Willette †
- Archie Williams (P/AC) (SS)
- Yancey Williams (P/AC)
- Eugene Winslow (P/AC)
- Henry Wise Jr. (POW)

== Y ==
- Coleman Young (P/AC)
- Perry H. Young Jr. (SS)

== See also ==
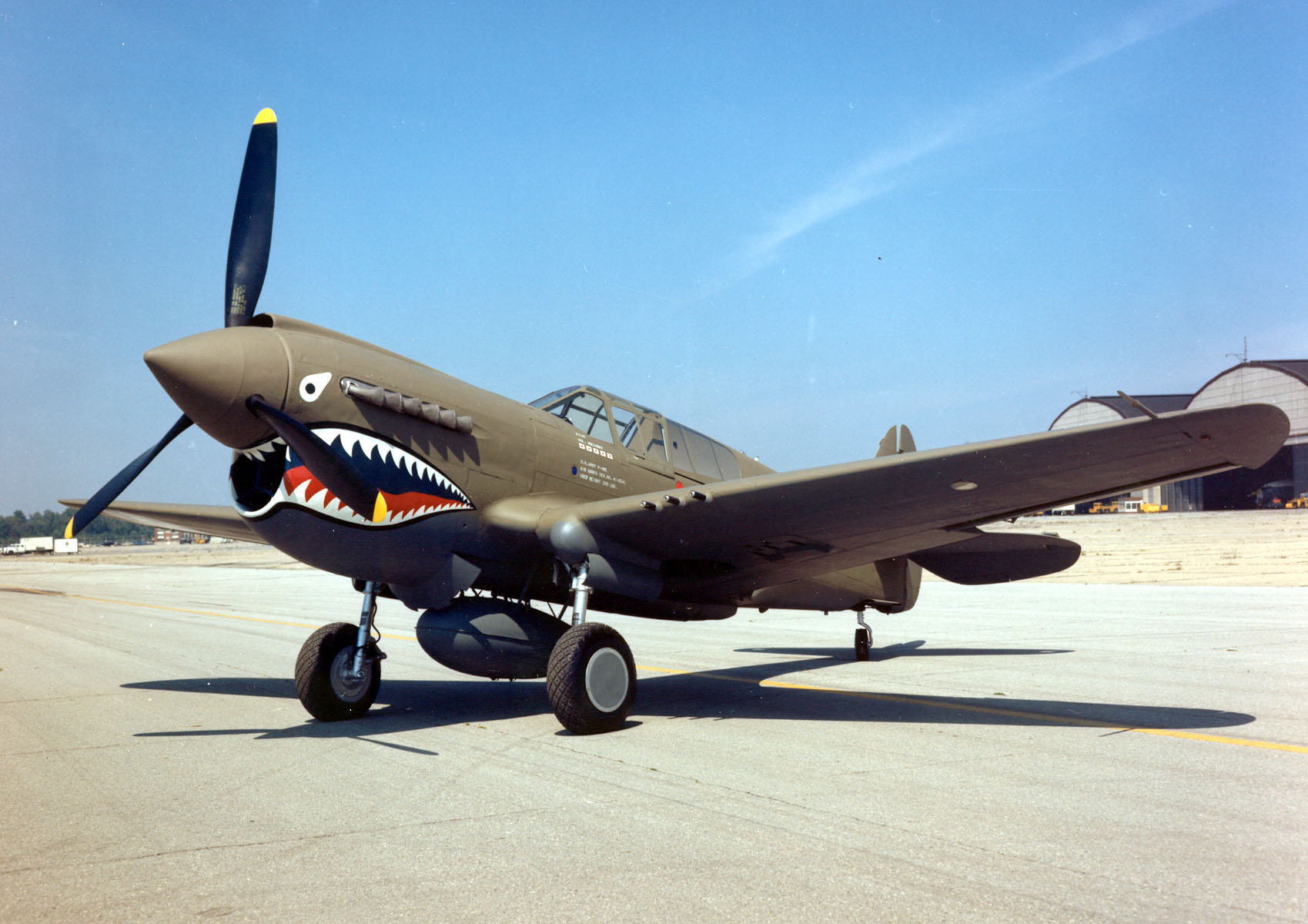
Single Engine P-40 Warhawk (Note: The Curtiss P-40 Warhawk is an American single-engined, single-seat, all-metal fighter and ground-attack aircraft that first flew in 1938. The Warhawk was used by most Allied powers during World War II, and remained in frontline service until the end of the war.)

- Executive Order 9981
- Freeman Field mutiny
- List of Tuskegee Airmen Cadet Pilot Graduation Classes
- Military history of African Americans
- Aircraft flown
  - Bell P-39 Airacobra
  - Curtiss P-40 Warhawk
  - North American B-25 Mitchell
  - North American P-51 Mustang
  - Republic P-47 Thunderbolt
