= John Lyle (pilot) =

Tuskegee Airman (1920–2019)

Flight Officer John Lyle
- John Lyle 1944
- Born: John Lyle; November 18, 1920; Chicago, Illinois, U.S.
- Died: January 5, 2019 (aged 98); Chicago, Illinois, U.S.
- Spouse: Eunice (4th wife)
- Relatives: 3 step children
- Military career
- Branch: United States Army Air Force
- Service years: 1944-1945
- Rank: Flight Officer
- Unit: 100th Fighter Squadron 332d Fighter Group
- Awards: Congressional Gold Medal 2007

Flight Officer John Lyle (November 18, 1920 – January 5, 2019) was an American World War II pilot and a member of the famed group of World War II-era African-Americans known as the Tuskegee Airmen. Dickson flew 26 combat missions during WWII. He had a lifelong love of sailing and over the course of his life he owned seven different boats. He was nicknamed Captain Jack for his love of sailing.

== Military service ==
Lyle graduated from Englewood High School on Chicago's Southside and in 1943 joined the military. He did not want to be a foot soldier so he pursued flying. After graduating from the Tuskegee Institute as a Flight Officer he was assigned to the European theatre. He flew 26 combat missions over Italy, Austria and Germany. Lyle, named his plane “Natalie” after his first wife. During the war he shot down a German Messerschmitt.

I was shot at several times as part of a formation. I watched bombers being torn apart, but they were performing the mission they signed up to do,” Mr. Lyle told Jet. “And when I had to shoot the guy who was shooting at the planes I was protecting, I did not feel bad because that was my assignment.

— John Lyle

=== Awards ===
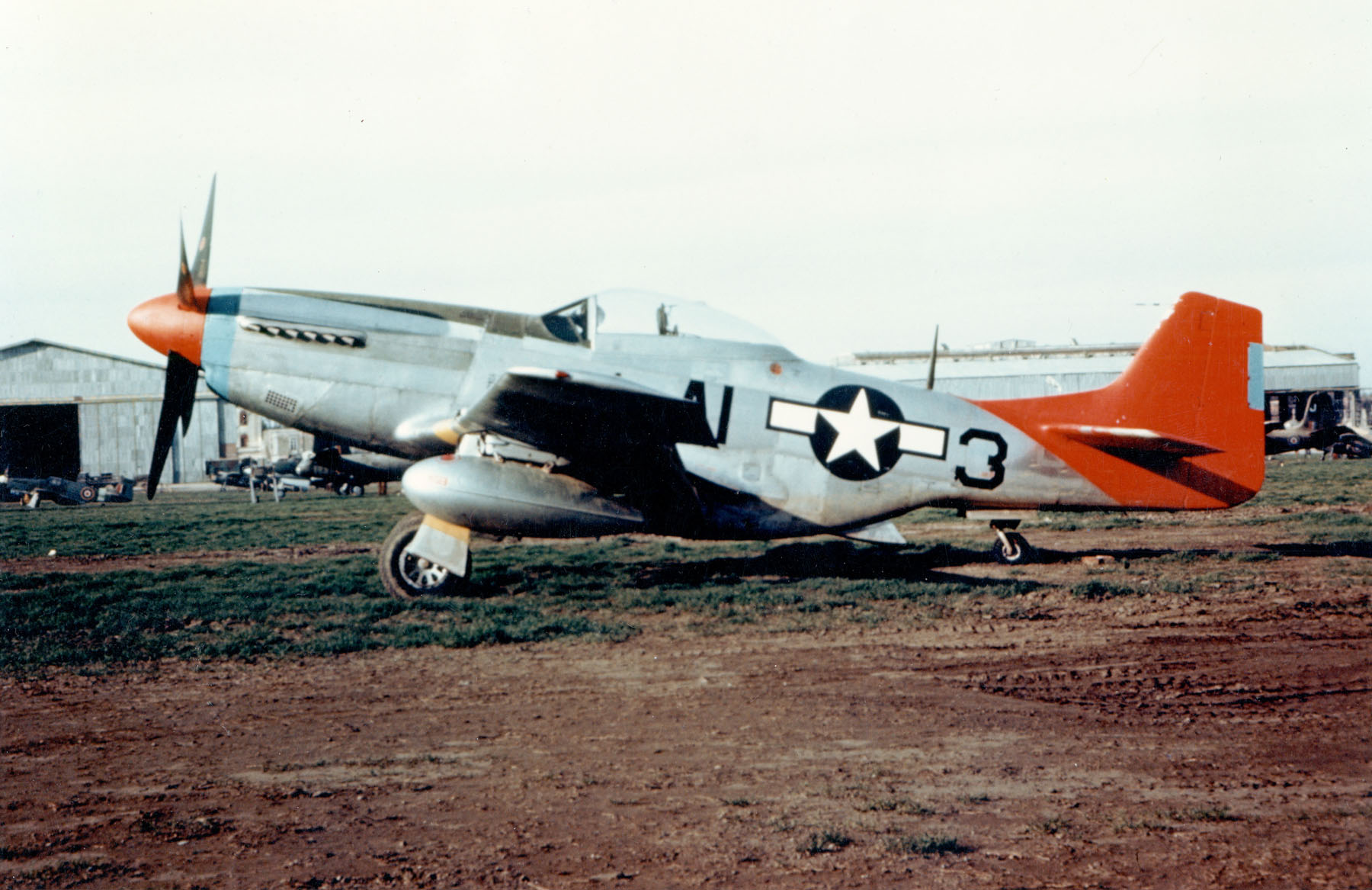
The Tuskegee Airmen's aircraft had distinctive markings that led to the name, "Red Tails." (Note: The red markings that distinguished the Tuskegee Airmen included red bands on the noses of P-51s as well as a red rudder; their P-51B and D Mustangs flew with similar color schemes, with red propeller spinners, yellow wing bands and all-red tail surfaces.)

- Congressional Gold Medal 2007

== Education ==
Tuskegee Institute 1944

== Personal life ==
Lyle was born and raised on the Southside of Chicago. He graduated from Englewood High School and in 1943 joined the military. He did not want to be a foot soldier so he pursued flying. Lyle married Eunice and was a stepfather to her 3 children. After the war, he became a police officer with the Chicago Park District and also started a tree-trimming company. He had prostate cancer at the end of his life. His wife Eunice said that his dying wish was to sit and watch the waves of Lake Michigan at Jackson Park Harbor Yacht Club. Lyle was married four times and Eunice was his fourth wife.

== See also ==
- Executive Order 9981
- List of Tuskegee Airmen
- Military history of African Americans
