= Wallace P. Reed =

Tuskegee Airman aviator weather officer (1919–1999)

2nd lieutenant Wallace P. Reed
- Wallace P. Reed
- Born: Wallace Patillo Reed; November 22, 1919; Portsmouth, NH U.S.
- Died: November 12, 1999 (aged 80); Los Angeles, California, U.S.
- Alma mater: University of New Hampshire, Massachusetts Institute of Technology
- Military career
- Allegiance: United States of America
- Branch: United States Army Air Force
- Service years: 1942-1946
- Rank: 2nd lieutenant
- Unit: Tuskegee Army Air Field
- Commands: Weather Officer
- Awards: Congressional Gold Medal awarded to the Tuskegee Airmen

2LT Wallace Patillo Reed (November 22, 1919 – November 12, 1999) was a World War II U.S. Army officer, U.S. military meteorologist, and the first ever African-American meteorologist in the U.S. military. Reed served at Tuskegee Army Air Field in Alabama as the chief weather officer responsible for the all-African American Tuskegee Airmen. Reed regularly advised Tuskegee Airmen pilots and instructors on weather maps and forecasts.

Reed is believed to have been the first ever African-American meteorologist at the U.S. Weather Bureau, the predecessor organization of the National Weather Service.

== Early life ==
He was born on November 22, 1919, in Portsmouth, New Hampshire, Reed was the son of Ralph M. Reed Sr. and Mary Pattillo Reed.

Graduating from Portsmouth High School in 1937, Reed attended the University of New Hampshire, where he earned a degree in mathematics.

In 1942, Reed graduated from a specialized training course at MIT.

== Military service ==
At the beginning of the 1940s, the U.S. Army possessed only 62 qualified weather forecasters. To remain a highly functional operation, the Army Air Forces anticipated a minimal requirement of 10,000 weather forecasters and weather observers.

To train a sufficient number of military weather forecasters, the Army Air Forces set up a weather cadet program in collaboration with the Massachusetts Institute of Technology (MIT), New York University (NYU) and the California Institute of Technology (CIT), and later with the University of Chicago, the University of California Los Angeles (UCLA) and a special Army Air Forces program in Grand Rapids, Michigan. The program's prerequisites included degrees in engineering, mathematics, physics, or chemistry, with a minimum of two years of coursework required in the program's later years. Through an extensive search for its second meteorological aviation cadet class in July 1941, MIT officials recruited Reed to join its program.

After graduating as a cadet and completing a three-week post-graduation military meteorologist orientation at Mitchel Field, New York, Reed received his commission into the Army Air Corps as a second lieutenant on March 21, 1942. On the same day, the Army Air Forces assigned Reed to the Tuskegee Army Air Field's inaugural Tuskegee Weather Detachment as base weather officer. Reed would become the first African-American meteorologist in the U.S. military.

Reed assumed his new assignment three weeks after the March 7, 1942, graduation of Tuskegee's first fighter pilot class of cadets.

== Weather Officer Corps ==
As a lieutenant and as later as a captain, Reed created a fully operational weather station to provide up-to-date forecasts and weather briefings to flight school officers and instructors. Reed led 15 enlisted men and officers, preparing several weather officers for deployment overseas. Four of Reed's officers would eventually be deployed with combat squadrons in the Mediterranean. Though his weather detachment's officer corps represented only 0.2 percent of all U.S. military weather officers, When he began his career at Tuskegee, Reed had five enlisted weathermen in his ranks, all of them trained at Chanute Field. Upwards of forty enlisted men would work under Reed at Tuskegee. Based on performance and standardized testing, the vast majority of Reed's enlisted staffers were awarded the AAF Weather Observer Badge.

== Post-World War II ==
On March 11, 1946, Reed completed his military service. Reed relocated to Manila in the Philippines, where he worked for Pan American Airways. Reed became an official with the U.S. Weather Bureau at Nichols Field in Manila, working there for over 30 years until returning to the United States years later.

Living in Alaminos, Pangasinan, and Sampaloc, Manila, for 34 years, Reed met and married Raymunda N. “Nena” Medrano (March 15, 1924 ~ February 7, 2020), his wife for 46 years. They had two children, son Reynoldo N. Reed and daughter Erlinda N. Reed.

== Death ==
On November 12, 1999, he died in Los Angeles, California. He is interred at Roosevelt Memorial Park in Los Angeles.

== See also ==
- Executive Order 9981
- List of Tuskegee Airmen Cadet Pilot Graduation Classes
- List of Tuskegee Airmen
- Military history of African Americans
- The Tuskegee Airmen (movie)
