= Paul Adams (pilot) =

United States Army Air Forces officer

Lieutenant Colonel Paul Adams
- Paul Adams in 1943
- Born: August 10, 1920; Greenville, South Carolina, U.S.
- Died: June 30, 2013 (aged 92); Lincoln, Nebraska, U.S.
- Spouse: Alda Virginia Thompson 1946-2013 (67 years)
- Military career
- Branch: United States Army Air Force
- Service years: 1942—1963
- Rank: Lieutenant colonel
- Unit: 332nd Fighter Group
- Awards: Air Medal with 3 Oak Leaf Clusters.; Congressional Gold Medal awarded to the Tuskegee Airmen 2006; President's Honor of Distinction Award Doane College 2007

Paul Adams (August 10, 1920 – June 30, 2013) was a World War II pilot with the Tuskegee Airmen. He was one of the first black teachers in the Lincoln Nebraska public school system. Adams also served as the president of the Lincoln Chapter of the NAACP. In 2008 the city of Lincoln Nebraska built a new elementary school and named it after Adams. The mascot of the school in an aviator.

== Military service ==
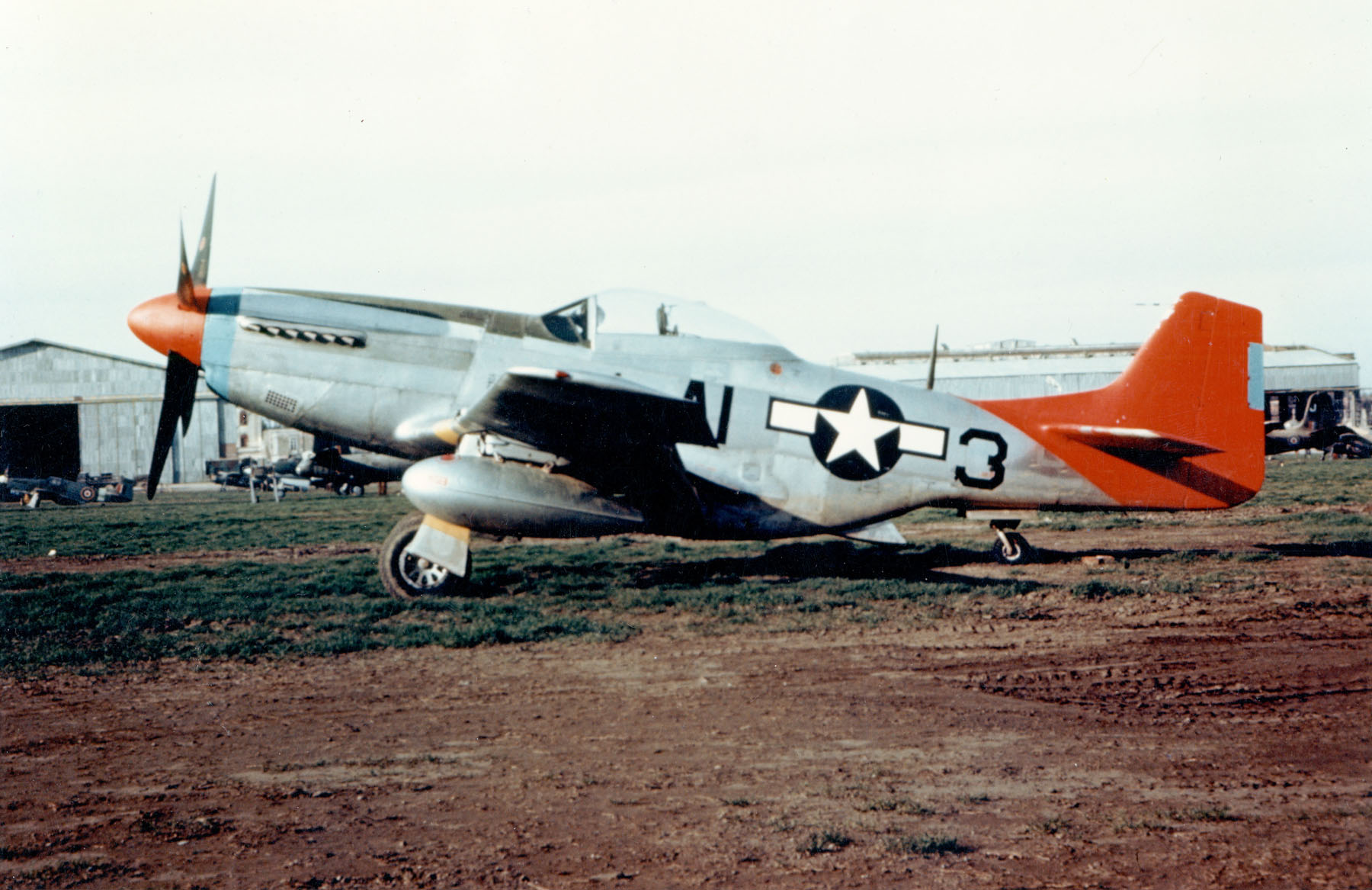
The Tuskegee Airmen's aircraft had distinctive markings that led to the name, "Red Tails." (Note: The red markings that distinguished the Tuskegee Airmen included red bands on the noses of P-51s as well as a red rudder; their P-51B and D Mustangs flew with similar color schemes, with red propeller spinners, yellow wing bands and all-red tail surfaces.)

Adams joined the army in 1942 and began fighter pilot training at Tuskegee University in Alabama. He was commissioned 2nd Lieutenant in 1943. He was assigned to the 332nd Fighter Group and sent to Naples Italy.

In 1945, Captain Adams came back to the United States and was discharged. In 1947 Adams reenlisted in the army as a 1st Lieutenant. After many assignments eventually Adams was assigned to Lincoln Nebraska as Deputy Base Commander.

=== Awards ===
- Air Medal with 3 Oak Leaf Clusters
- Congressional Gold Medal awarded to the Tuskegee Airmen in 2006
- President's Honor of Distinction Award Doane College 2007

== Education ==
- Sterling High School, Class of 1938
- South Carolina State College, Class of 1941
- Tuskegee University Class of 1943

== Personal life ==
Adams was a native of Greenville, South Carolina. After he graduated from college he joined the United States Army Air Force. He flew missions in World War II with the Tuskegee Airmen. Adams married Alda Virginia Thompson in 1946 and together they had three children. The Army assigned Adams to Lincoln Nebraska in 1962. Adams stayed in service until 1963. He retired in 1963 and began teaching industrial arts at Lincoln High School in 1964–1982. He was one of the first black teachers in the Lincoln Nebraska public school system. Adams also served as the president of the Lincoln Chapter of the NAACP.

== See also ==
- Executive Order 9981
- List of Tuskegee Airmen
- Military history of African Americans
