= Julius Freeman =

Tuskagee Airman (1927–2016)

- Julius Freeman
- Born: April 9, 1927; Lexington, Kentucky
- Died: July 22, 2016 (aged 89); Spring Garden, Queens, New York
- Burial place: Calverton National Cemetery Calverton, Suffolk County, New York, US
- Spouse: Dorothy
- Relatives: 3 children
- Military career
- Allegiance: United States
- Branch: United States Army Air Forces
- Unit: Tuskegee Airmen
- Awards: Congressional Gold Medal
- Other work: Car salesman

Julius Freeman (April 9, 1927 – July 22, 2016) was a World War II-era Tuskegee Airman.

== Military ==
He was a medical technician with the Tuskegee Airmen.

== Awards ==
- Congressional Gold Medal awarded to the Tuskegee Airmen in 2006|group=N}}

== Death ==
Freeman, died of a heart attack in Spring Garden, New York, on July 22, 2016.

== See also ==
- Dogfights (TV series)
- Executive Order 9981
- List of Tuskegee Airmen
- Military history of African Americans
- The Tuskegee Airmen (movie)
