= Clarence Dart =

American Tuskegee Airman (1920–2012)

Clarence W. Dart, Sr.
- Clarence Dart
- Born: 6 December 1920; Elmira, New York, U.S.
- Died: 17 February 2012 (aged 91); Saratoga Springs, New York, U.S.
- Military career
- Allegiance: United States of America
- Branch: United States Army Air Forces; United States Air Force
- Service years: 1943–?
- Rank: Captain; Lieutenant Colonel (post war)
- Units: 12th Air Force (45 missions); 15th Air Force (50 missions); New York Air National Guard
- Conflicts: World War II
- Awards: Air Medal; Congressional Gold Medal awarded to Tuskegee Airmen; Distinguished Flying Cross; Purple Heart

Clarence W. Dart, Sr. (6 December 1920 – 17 February 2012) (WIA) was an American World War II fighter pilot and member of the Tuskegee Airmen. During World War II. Dart was shot down twice earning two purple hearts. He was the recipient of the Distinguished Flying Cross award.

== Career ==
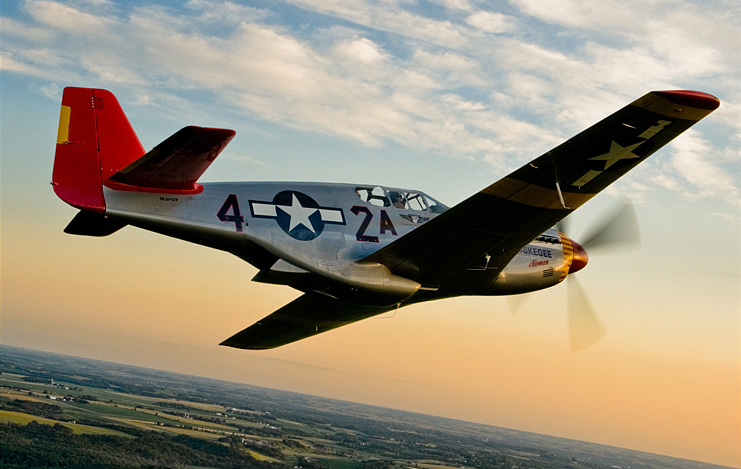
P-51 aircraft with red markings. (Note: The Tuskegee Airmen became known for flying the P-51 aircraft with red markings that distinguished the Tuskegee Airmen included red bands on the noses of P-51s as well as a red rudder; their P-51B and D Mustangs flew with similar color schemes, with red propeller spinners, yellow wing bands and all-red tail surfaces.)

He flew a total of 95 missions, and was shot down twice, earning two Purple Hearts. Dart died 17 February 2012 in Saratoga Springs, New York.

Clarence was Emeritus on The Salvation Army Saratoga Springs, New York Advisory Board in which he has served since November 11, 1963.

== Awards ==
- Air Medal
- American Defense Service Medal
- Congressional Gold Medal awarded to Tuskegee Airmen in 2006
- Distinguished Flying Cross with four Oak Leaf Clusters,
- National Defense Service Medal
- Purple Heart with one Oak Leaf Cluster
- World War II Victory Medal

== See also ==
- Dogfights (TV series)
- Executive Order 9981
- List of Tuskegee Airmen
- Military history of African Americans
- The Tuskegee Airmen (movie)
