= Yancey Williams =

United States military officer and fighter pilot (1916–1953)

Yancey Williams (alternatively spelt Yancy Williams, February 1, 1916 – October 22, 1953) was a U.S. Army Air Force/U.S. Air Force officer and pilot with the 85th Fighter-Interceptor Squadron and the 332nd Fighter Group, best known as the Tuskegee Airmen or "Red Tails".

Williams is notable for his landmark 1941 federal lawsuit against the U.S. War Department for denying Williams' entry into the U.S. Army Air Corps's pilot cadet program based on Williams' race. Leveraging tactics inspired by the seminal 1898 U.S. Supreme Court case Plessy v. Ferguson's "separate but equal doctrine, the U.S. War Department avoided the lawsuit, immediately creating the racially separate and allegedly equal 99th Pursuit Squadron (later the 99th Fighter Squadron) at Tuskegee Institute. This unit would be solely responsible for the training and possible deployment of all African American pilots, ground crew and support operations.

== Early life and education ==
Williams was born in Louisiana on February 1, 1916. He attended Tulsa's Booker T. Washington High School, graduating in 1932. Williams attended Howard University, majoring in engineering.

In September 1938, Tuskegee Airmen training impresario C. Alfred "Chief" Anderson started Howard University's Civilian Pilot Training. Williams was one of Anderson's student pilots at Howard. In 1940, In 1940, Tuskegee Institute recruited Anderson as its Chief Civilian Flight Instructor for the newly-minted program for African American pilots.

== War Department lawsuit, military service, Tuskegee Airmen ==
In 1941, Williams applied to become a pilot cadet with the U.S. Army Air Corps (USAAC). On December 13, 1940, the USAAC summarily rejected Williams based on his race. In response, Williams, the NAACP, and fellow Howard University mechanical engineering student/private pilot Spann Watson (August 14, 1916 – April 15, 2010), filed a federal lawsuit in the United States District Court for the District of Columbia against the U.S. War Department to force the government to allow Yancey and other "similarly situated" qualified African Americans to train as USAAC pilots. Their complaint named several government and military officials as defendants: U.S. Secretary of War Henry Stimson, U.S. Army Chief of Staff Major-General George C. Marshall, U.S. Army Adjutant-General Emory Sherwood Adams, Chief of Air Corps Major-General Henry H. Arnold, and commanding general of the Third Corps Area, Major General Walter Schuyler Grant.

According to his complaint, Williams alleged that he had achieved or exceeded the USAAC's entry and appeals requirements:

- Completed at least two years of college;
- Completed the Civil Aeronautics Authority's primary and secondary pilot training;
- Earned a civilian pilot's license;
- Passed an official military physicians' physical examination;
- Completed all application requisites for cadet appointment;
- Completed and sent off, on November 20, 1940, an official application, references and other required records to the Third Corps Area's commanding officer;
- Filed an appeal of his initial application denial to the Adjutant-General and the U.S. Secretary of War.

On December 13, 1940, Williams received his final race-based denial from War Department.

Leveraging tactics inspired by the seminal 1898 U.S. Supreme Court case Plessy v. Ferguson's "separate but equal doctrine, the War Department dodged the lawsuit, immediately creating the racially separate, allegedly equal 99th Pursuit Squadron (later the 99th Fighter Squadron) at Tuskegee Institute. This unit would be solely responsible for the training and possible deployment of all African American pilots, ground crew and support operations.

Initially, the NAACP, the African American press and other African American advocacy groups pushed back on an all-African American pilot corps; they generally desired total racial integration in the U.S. military. Nonetheless, they mostly acquiesced in lieu of no opportunities for inspiring African American pilots and support crew during World War II.

At some point, the USAAC admitted Williams, very likely in a non-pilot role as a 2nd lieutenant. However, Williams would be a 1st lieutenant when he finally received his wings as a member of Tuskegee Air Field's Single Engine Section Cadet Class SE-44-J on December 28, 1944.

The USAAC also admitted Spann Watson to the Tuskegee Flight Cadet Program in November 1941. On July 3, 1942, Watson graduated as a member of the Single Engine Section Cadet Class SE-42-F, receiving his wings and commission as a 2nd lieutenant.

Little is known of Williams' military career between 1941 and 1944 and 1944 to 1953. Nonetheless, documents show that he may have participated in an air surveillance project created by President Dwight D. Eisenhower whose presidential term began January 1953, ten months before his death in 1953. At the time of his passing, he held the rank of Major in the U.S. Air Force. He was serving as a squadron Material Officer in the 85th Fighter-Interceptor Squadron at Scott AFB in Illinois.

== Death ==
On October 22, 1953, Williams was killed when his North American F-86D Sabre crashed after takeoff from Runway 14 in F-86D-20-NA, 51–3029. When he attempted a northwest turn, he overshot the approach to Runway 36 and tried to land in a nearby cornfield west of Scott AFB. Though Williams almost crash landed successfully, his aircraft struck an electric transformer pole, causing the aircraft to explode on impact. An investigation found that the aircraft's hydraulic elevator control locked up as a result of a misconnection between hydraulic lines. This was the 85th Fighter-Interceptor Squadron's first fatal North American F-86D Sabre loss.

Williams was 37 years old. He was interred at Arlington National Cemetery, Sec: 8, Site: 5428-A.

== See also ==
- List of Tuskegee Airmen Cadet Pilot Graduation Classes
- List of Tuskegee Airmen
- Military history of African Americans
- Dogfights (TV series)
- Executive Order 9981
- The Tuskegee Airmen (movie)
