= John Ellis Edwards =

United States Air Force officer (1922–1979)

Lieutenant Colonel John Ellis Edwards
- John "Ellis" Edwards in a WWII era photo
- Born: May 17, 1922; Steubenville, Ohio, US
- Died: June 3, 1979 (aged 57); Steubenville, Ohio, US
- Burial place: Union Cemetery
- Relatives: Brother Jerome Edwards
- Military career
- Allegiance: United States of America
- Branch: United States Army Air Force
- Rank: 2nd Lieutenant (Army Air force); Lieutenant Colonel (Air force)
- Nickname: Ellis
- Units: 99th Fighter Squadron; 332nd Fighter Group
- Conflicts: World War II; Korean War
- Awards: Congressional Gold Medal (2007); Distinguished Flying Cross

John "Ellis" Edwards (May 17, 1922 – June 3, 1979) was an American aviator who served with the Tuskegee Airmen during World War II. He served in the 332nd Fighter Group and earned the Distinguished Flying Cross award. He also served as a pilot in the Korean War.

== Early life and education ==
Edward and Willie Edwards were his parents. He had a brother (Jerome) and sister (Gwendolyn). His parents moved to Steubenville, Ohio and he and his siblings attended Steubenville High School.

After high school graduation he and his brother Jerome both attended West Virginia State College. The college became one of the first black colleges to enroll pilots in a Pilot Training Program and both brothers enrolled in the program. Both brothers became Tuskegee Airmen after completing training in Tuskegee. His brother Jerome was killed in a training exercise May 7, 1943 when his P-40 suffered a catastrophic failure upon takeoff. His brother's death was the first for the 332nd Fighter Group.

== Military service ==
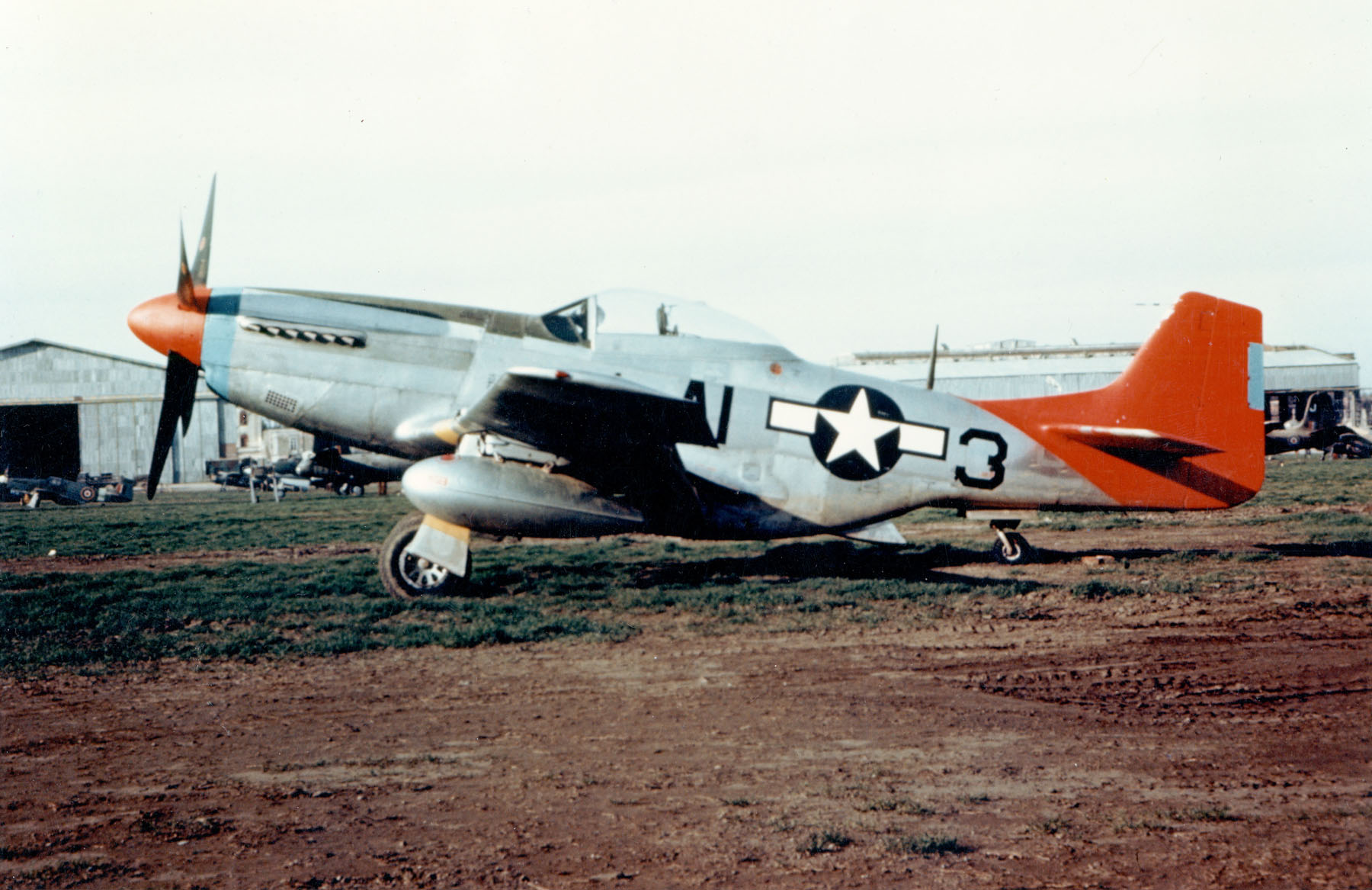
The Tuskegee Airmen's aircraft had distinctive markings that led to the name, "Red Tails." (Note: The red markings that distinguished the Tuskegee Airmen included red bands on the noses of P-51s as well as a red rudder; their P-51B and D Mustangs flew with similar color schemes, with red propeller spinners, yellow wing bands and all-red tail surfaces.)

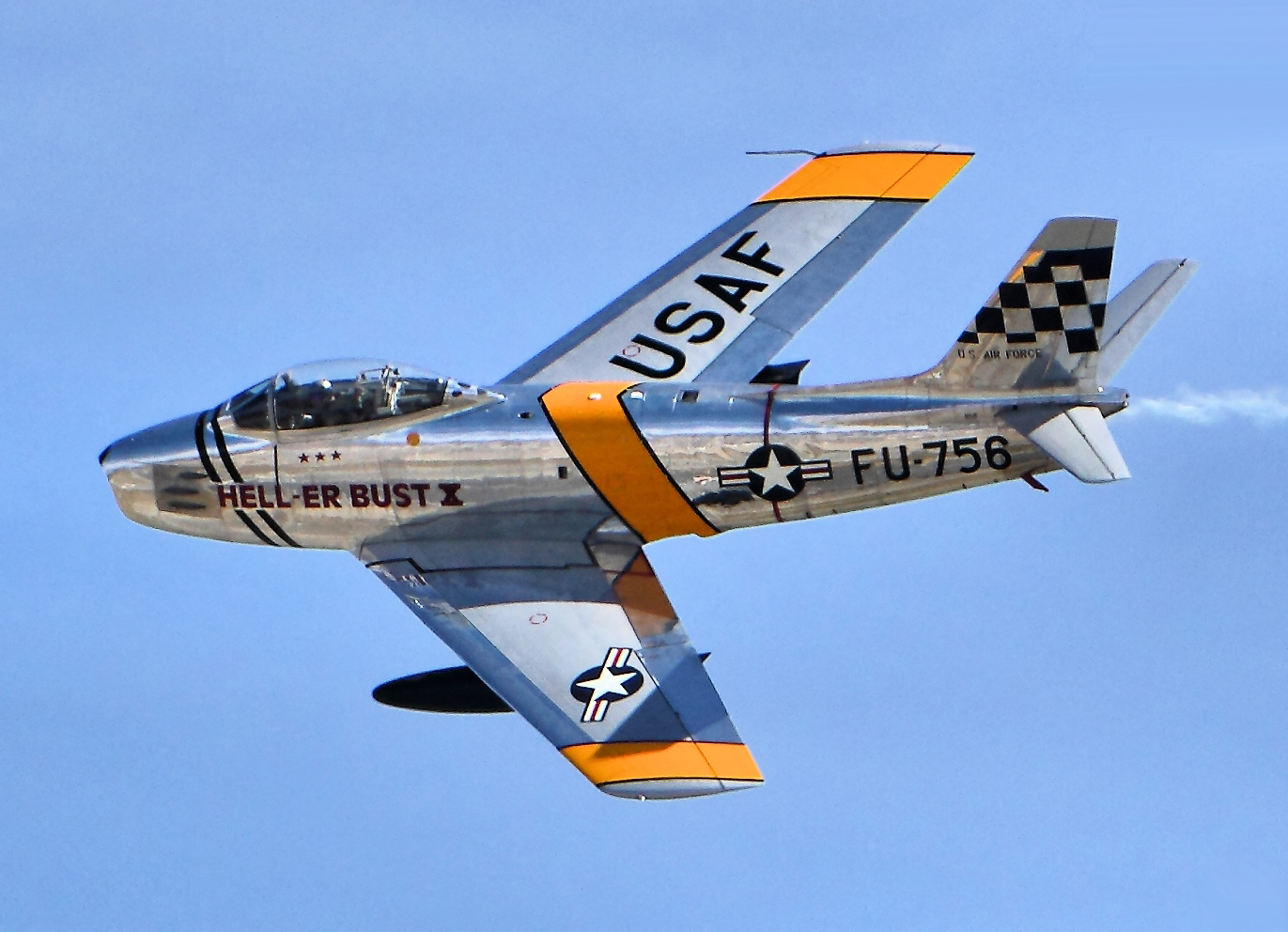
F86F Sabre similar to the jet flown by Edwards in the Korean War

Upon completing his training at Tuskegee, Edwards was commissioned as a 2nd Lieutenant on April 8, 1944. He was assigned to the 99th Fighter Squadron, 332nd Fighter Group. In 1945 he was sent to Italy and assigned to Ramitelli Air Force Base where he and other Tuskegee pilots escorted allied planes on bombing runs. On April 1, 1945 he was acting as squadron section leader, when he shot down two Messerschmitt Bf 109s on an escort mission. Edwards was awarded Distinguished flying Cross.

Shortly after he was discharged the Korean War began, and he joined the Air Force, serving in the 332nd Fighter Group and flew many combat missions in the F86 Sabre. He held the rank of lieutenant colonel.

After the Korean War he moved to Washington, D.C., and later he moved to Los Angeles, California.

== Awards ==
- Distinguished Flying Cross
- Air Medal
- Presidential Unit Citation
- Congressional Gold Medal awarded to the Tuskegee Airmen in 2006

Edwards hometown, Steubenville, OH is known as the "City of Murals". There is a mural (located along Washington Street in Steubenville) dedicated to him and his brother Jerome. He and his brother also have their names engraved in the Tuskegee Airmen Memorial located in Sewickley Cemetery in Sewickley, Pennsylvania.

== See also ==
- Executive Order 9981
- List of Tuskegee Airmen
- Military history of African Americans
