= Eugene Smith (aviator) =

American military aviator and attorney (1918–2012)

- Born: 1918; Franklin, Ohio, U.S.
- Died: November 21, 2012 (aged 94); Cynthiana, Kentucky, U.S.
- Military career
- Allegiance: United States of America
- Branch: United States Army Air Corps
- Service years: c. 1940 – c. 1944
- Rank: Lieutenant
- Unit: 332nd Fighter Group
- Conflicts: World War II
- Awards: World War II Victory Medal; EAME Medal; Congressional Gold Medal awarded to Tuskegee Airmen

Eugene Smith (1918 – November 21, 2012) was an American military aviator and attorney. He was a lieutenant with the Tuskegee Airmen in World War II, escorting bombers in Europe, and then served as a military flight instructor. Returning to Ohio, he earned a law degree. He practiced law for over 50 years, including argument of a first amendment case before the Supreme Court of the United States and leading the efforts toward racial integration of juries.

== Early life and education ==
Smith was born in 1918 in Franklin, Ohio. He attended Withrow High School in Cincinnati, where he ran track and played baseball, graduating in 1936. He then studied at Kentucky State University in Frankfort, Kentucky, receiving a Bachelor of Arts degree.

== Military career ==
After college, Smith enlisted in the United States Army Air Corps. Because of his mixed European and Native American ancestry, his birth certificate was marked "C" (for "colored", as was common at the time), and he was assigned to serve with the African-American units known as the Tuskegee Airmen. He flew bomber escort missions during World War II in Europe with the 332nd Fighter Group and later served as a flight instructor.

== Professional career ==
After returning from military service, Smith attended Franklin College of Law in Columbus, Ohio. He practiced law in Cincinnati for over 50 years, including argument of a first amendment case before the Supreme Court of the United States. While serving as Chief Trial Lawyer in the Hamilton County, Ohio Public Defender’s Office, he led the controversial efforts to integrate juries in the county.

== Later life ==
In the early 1990s, Smith retired to a houseboat at the Turtle Creek Marina in Florence, Indiana on the Ohio River (the border with Kentucky). He died at the Harrison County Hospital in Cynthiana, Kentucky on November 21, 2012.

== See also ==
- Dogfights (TV series)
- Executive Order 9981
- Freeman Field Mutiny
- List of Tuskegee Airmen
- Military history of African Americans
- The Tuskegee Airmen (movie)
- Tuskegee Airmen
