= Howard Baugh =

Tuskegee Airman and US Air Force Lt. Col. (1920–2008)

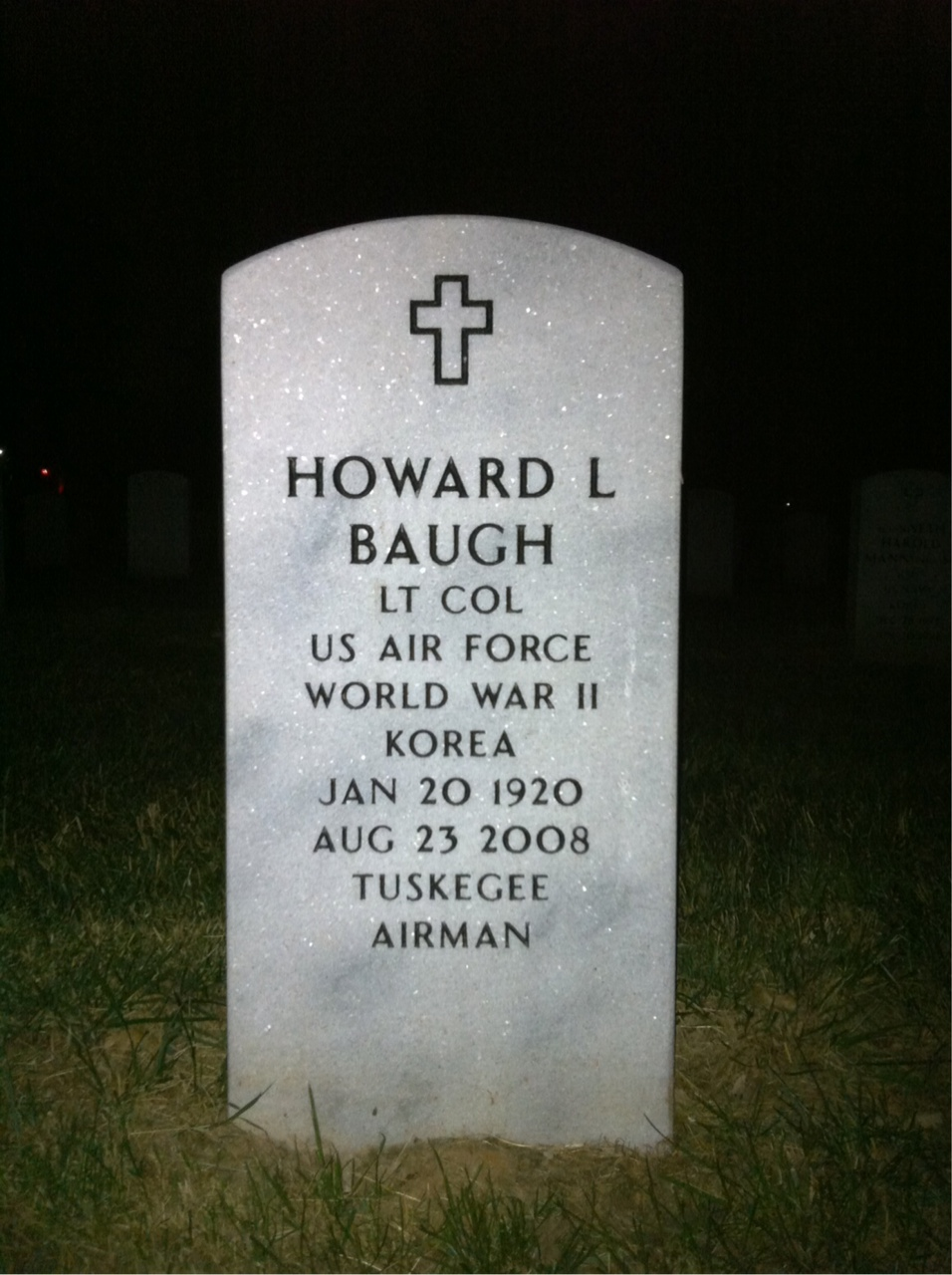
Grave at Arlington National Cemetery

Howard Lee Baugh (January 20, 1920 – August 23, 2008) was an American military aviator who served with the Tuskegee Airmen during World War II.

== Biography ==
Howard Baugh was born and raised in Petersburg, Virginia, where he graduated from Virginia State College in 1941.

Baugh enlisted in the U.S. Army as an aviation cadet of the U.S. Army Air Corps in March 1942. He was accepted into a newly formed group, later known as the Tuskegee Airmen, an all-black unit at Tuskegee Institute in Alabama. He was commissioned a 2nd Lt. in November 1942. In the group, 996 were pilots, and 450 of them were sent into combat. He flew 136 combat missions for the 332nd Fighter Group, 99th Fighter Squadron in Sicily, Italy during World War. The group was nicknamed the "Red Tails" or "Red Tail Squadron" for the red-feather markings painted on the tails of their aircraft.

After World War II, Baugh continued to serve in the military as a flight instructor, commander, and director of logistics. He rose to the rank of lieutenant colonel and retired from the U.S. Air Force in 1967.

Military honors accorded Baugh include:

- The Distinguished Flying Cross
- The Air Medal with three Oak Leaf Clusters
- The Air Force Medal
- The Air Force Outstanding Unit Award
- Burial in Arlington National Cemetery.

Civilian recognition includes:

- The Howard Baugh Chapter of Tuskegee Airmen, Inc. (2003)
- The French Legion of Honor (2004, awarded by the French Defense Minister)
- Virginia Aviation Hall of Fame Members (2006).
- The Congressional Gold Medal awarded to the Tuskegee Airmen (2007, presented by President George W. Bush).

A life-size statue of Baugh, sculpted by Antonio Tobias Mendez, was unveiled in November 2018 at the Black History Museum and Cultural Center of Virginia in Richmond, Virginia (at the former First Battalion Virginia Volunteers Armory). It is the first monument in Virginia, and the eighth monument in the U.S., honoring a member of the Tuskegee Airmen. Plans for the monument include permanently locating it to Petersburg.

Baugh was the widower of the former Constance Layne. He was survived by, among others, his sons—David P. Baugh of Richmond, Virginia, Howard Layne Baugh of Norfolk, and Richard Baugh of Crownsville, Maryland —and two daughters-in-law, four grandchildren, and four great grandchildren.

== See also ==
- Executive Order 9981
- List of Tuskegee Airmen
- Military history of African Americans
