= Joseph Gomer (pilot) =

Tuskegee Airman (1920–2013)

Joseph Gomer (June 20, 1920 – October 10, 2013) was an American pilot who served with the Tuskegee Airmen during World War II.

== Early life ==
Gomer was born in Iowa Falls, Iowa in 1920. He attended and graduated from Ellsworth Community College.

== Military service ==
In 1942, he enlisted in the United States Army Air Forces and carried out over 160 special missions until 1947. During World War II, he was shot down by an enemy fighter, but he survived. By 1964, he achieved the rank of major and soon after retired. Gomer spent more than 20 years working for the US Forest Service.

== Honors ==
In 1985, he received the Superior Services Award for his work with minorities and women. In 2004, Gomer was inducted into the Iowa Aviation Hall of Fame and was also awarded with a Doctorate of Humanities from the Ellsworth College. George W. Bush awarded the Tuskegee Airmen collectively, including Gomer, with a Congressional Gold Medal in 2007. He was also invited to several events by current USA president, Barack Obama. At the Duluth International Airport, Gomer was honored by a bronze statue built at a new terminal located in the Duluth Airport. In 2013, Iowa Falls honored Gomer with a bronze statue, located on the campus of Ellsworth Community College.

== Personal life ==
He married Elizabeth Caperton in 1949, who died in 2012. The couple had two daughters, Tanya and Phyllis. Gomer was Minnesota's last surviving member of the Tuskegee airmen at the time of his death on October 10, 2013, of cancer.

== See also ==
- Dogfights (TV series)
- Executive Order 9981
- List of Tuskegee Airmen
- Military history of African Americans
- The Tuskegee Airmen (movie)
