= Wilfred DeFour =

Tuskegee Airman (1918–2018)

Staff Sergeant Wilfred DeFour
- Wilfred DeFour
- Born: Wilfred DeFour; April 12, 1918; Colón, Panama
- Died: December 8, 2018 (aged 100); Harlem, New York
- Military career
- Branch: United States Army Air Force
- Service years: 1942–1945
- Rank: Staff Sergeant
- Units: 366th Air Service Squadron and 332nd Fighter Group
- Awards: Congressional Gold Medal awarded to the Tuskegee Airmen

SSG Wilfred DeFour (April 12, 1918 – December 8, 2018) was a Panamanian-American soldier and centenarian. Born in Colón, Panama, in 1918, DeFour emigrated with his family to the United States when Wilfred was still a child. The family settled in the Harlem section of New York City.

During World War II, DeFour served in the United States Army as an aircraft technician with the distinguished Tuskegee Airmen, the first all African-American air corps. DeFour died in December 2018 at the age of 100.

== Military service ==
=== World War II ===
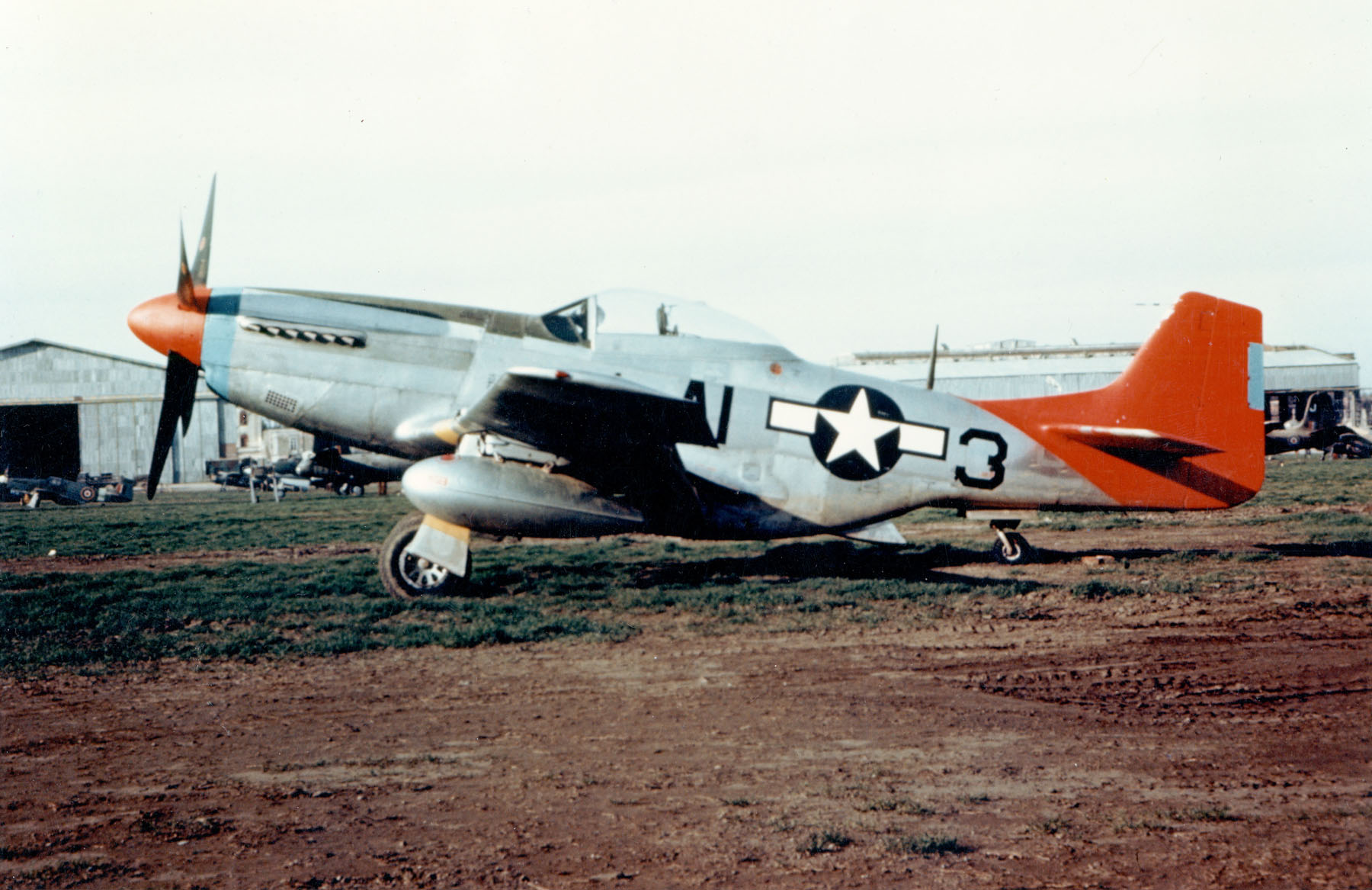
The Tuskegee Airmen's aircraft had distinctive markings that led to the name, "Red Tails".(The red markings that distinguished the Tuskegee Airmen included red bands on the noses of P-51s, as well as a red rudder; their P-51B and D Mustangs flew with similar color schemes, with red propeller spinners, yellow wing bands, and all-red tail surfaces.

DeFour joined the Air Corps in 1942, and after completing basic training, he was assigned to the 366th Air Service Squadron and stationed in Italy in 1943. In November 2018, DeFour appeared in a ceremony renaming a Harlem post office in honor of the Tuskegee Airmen.

== Education ==
- Dewitt Clinton High School
- City College and NYU's school of Commerce.
- Tuskegee Institute (1942)

=== Awards ===
- A Congressional Gold Medal was awarded to the Tuskegee Airmen in 2006.

== Personal life ==
DeFour was born in Colón, Panama, and emigrated to New York. After the war, he completed his associate and bachelor's degrees in real estate and business administration. He worked for the United States Postal Service, and retired after 33 years. Defour was married to Ruth Christian (died in 2005). Together, they had two children, Wilfred Jr. and Darlene. He was survived by the latter.

== Death ==
DeFour had been receiving at-home care, and a care provider found him in the bathroom of his Fifth Avenue apartment in Harlem, New York around 9:00 am. Authorities said he died of natural causes.

== See also ==
- Executive Order 9981
- List of Tuskegee Airmen
- Military history of African Americans
- Fly (2009 play about the 332d Fighter Group)
