= Theodore Johnson (Tuskegee Airman) =

WWII-era Air Force serviceman (1924–2020)

Theodore P. Johnson, Jr.
- Theodore Johnson 1944
- Born: March 22, 1924
- Died: February 16, 2020 (aged 95); San Antonio, Texas
- Burial place: Fort Sam Houston National Cemetery
- Military career
- Allegiance: United States of America
- Branch: United States Army Air Force
- Service years: 1943–1949
- Awards: Congressional Gold Medal awarded to Tuskegee Airmen

Theodore P. Johnson, Jr. (March 22, 1924 – February 16, 2020) was an American military serviceman who served during World War II and was a Documented Original Tuskegee Airman.

== Early life and education ==
He attended Dunbar High School at Temple, Texas, June 6, 1941.

== Military service ==
In 1943 Johnson was drafted and sent to Fort Benning, GA. In 1944 he arrived in St. Louis, MO, Jefferson Barracks Military Post, for basic training. In April 1944 he was sent to Scotland, and in July arrived at Omaha Beach on a tank landing ship; from there he journeyed across France, Belgium and Germany. On July 5, 1945 he arrived in Boston, Massachusetts by way of LeHavre, France.

He re-enlisted on January 26, 1946, and was eventually posted to Lockbourne Air Base, Ohio, as a result of this he is classified as a Documented Original Tuskegee Airman (DOTA).

== Later life ==
Later in life, Johnson spent time speaking to groups about his experiences as a Tuskegee Airman. He was "known for his detailed memory of his travels, assignments and personal encounters". In 2005, Johnson and other Tuskegee Airmen spoke to their former unit the 332nd Fighter group, in Balad, Iraq. "War is hell," Johnson once said. "Don't nobody tell you that war is not hell. Anybody tell you he wasn't afraid, he's a lie." Toward the final years of his life, he frequently took part in honors and ceremonies, for himself and representing the Tuskegee Airmen. In 2018, he went on an Honor Flight to Washington, D.C., with 50 other veterans from Austin. He was presented with a portrait painting of himself at the "Portraits of Patriots Art Show", in the Patriot's Casa at Texas A&M University-San Antonio.

== Personal life ==
He and his wife had nine children.

Johnson died in his home in San Antonio, Texas. After his death there were only two living members in San Antonio.

== Awards ==
- Congressional Gold Medal awarded to the Tuskegee Airmen in 2006

== See also ==
- Executive Order 9981
- List of Tuskegee Airmen Cadet Pilot Graduation Classes
- List of Tuskegee Airmen
- Military history of African Americans
- The Tuskegee Airmen (movie)
- Fly (2009 play about the 332d Fighter Group)
