= Henry Cabot Lodge Bohler =

Tuskegee Airman (1925–2007)

- Bohler at 17
- Born: June 8, 1925; Augusta, Georgia
- Died: August 10, 2007 (aged 82); Tampa, Florida
- Military career
- Allegiance: United States of America
- Branch: United States Army Air Corps
- Service years: 1942–1947
- Rank: Second Lieutenant
- Unit: Tuskegee Airmen
- Conflicts: World War II
- Awards: Air Medal

Henry Cabot Lodge Bohler (June 8, 1925 – August 10, 2007) was an American military serviceman and electrician. He was trained with the Tuskegee Airmen during World War II.

== Military service ==
He enlisted in the United States Army Air Forces at age 17. By the time he was awarded his wings in 1944, there was no need for more pilots. He left the service in 1947 as a second lieutenant.

He graduated from Hampton University in Virginia.

== Post-war life ==
Bohler and his family moved to Tampa, Florida in 1950. He became Tampa's first African-American licensed electrician and built a successful business, rising to become one of Tampa's first African-American millionaires.

In 1960, Bohler, his wife and their three children went to the Lowry Park Zoo in Tampa. The family was denied entry to the zoo because of their race. Bohler sued the city for discrimination. During the two years it took to hear the case, Bohler was routinely harassed by city police who would pull his car over and demand to check his driver's license. On the day he was ordered to appear in federal court, he was pulled over five times. Bohler ultimately prevailed, with the result being a 1962 federal order requiring Tampa to integrate its public recreation facilities.

== Later life ==
Bohler often spoke to school groups about his military service and attended annual reunions of the Tuskegee Airmen, flying his own Piper Archer airplane to the events.

Bohler stopped flying at the age of 80 after being diagnosed with a brain tumor. Some time later, he fell in his garage and hit his head, which apparently caused bleeding on the brain that was undetected at the time. He was later admitted to a local hospital and spent the next two years in various care facilities. Henry Bohler died on August 10, 2007, in Tampa, Florida, from complications from his fall injuries. He was survived by his wife Clifford Bohler, three children Henry Jr., Pamela, and George, seven grandchildren and five great-grandchildren.

== See also ==
- Executive Order 9981
- List of Tuskegee Airmen
- Military history of African Americans
