= William Bartley (pilot) =

American military pilot

Captain William Bartley
- William Roscoe Bartley
- Born: William Roscoe Bartley; May 16, 1916; Jacksonville, Florida, U.S.
- Died: January 28, 2011 (aged 94); Jacksonville, Florida, U.S.
- Burial place: Mill Creek Road Cemetery Eureka, Marion County, Florida, U.S.
- Military career
- Branch: United States Army Air Force
- Service years: 1942-1950
- Rank: Captain
- Nickname: Will
- Unit: 332nd Fighter Group
- Awards: Congressional Gold Medal awarded to Tuskegee Airmen

Captain William Bartley (May 16, 1916 – January 28, 2011) was an American military pilot who served with the Tuskegee Airmen during World War II. He graduated from the Tuskegee Institute in 1943, was given the rank of 2nd Lieutenant, and was placed with the 332nd Fighter Group and the 99th Fighter Squadron.

== Military service ==
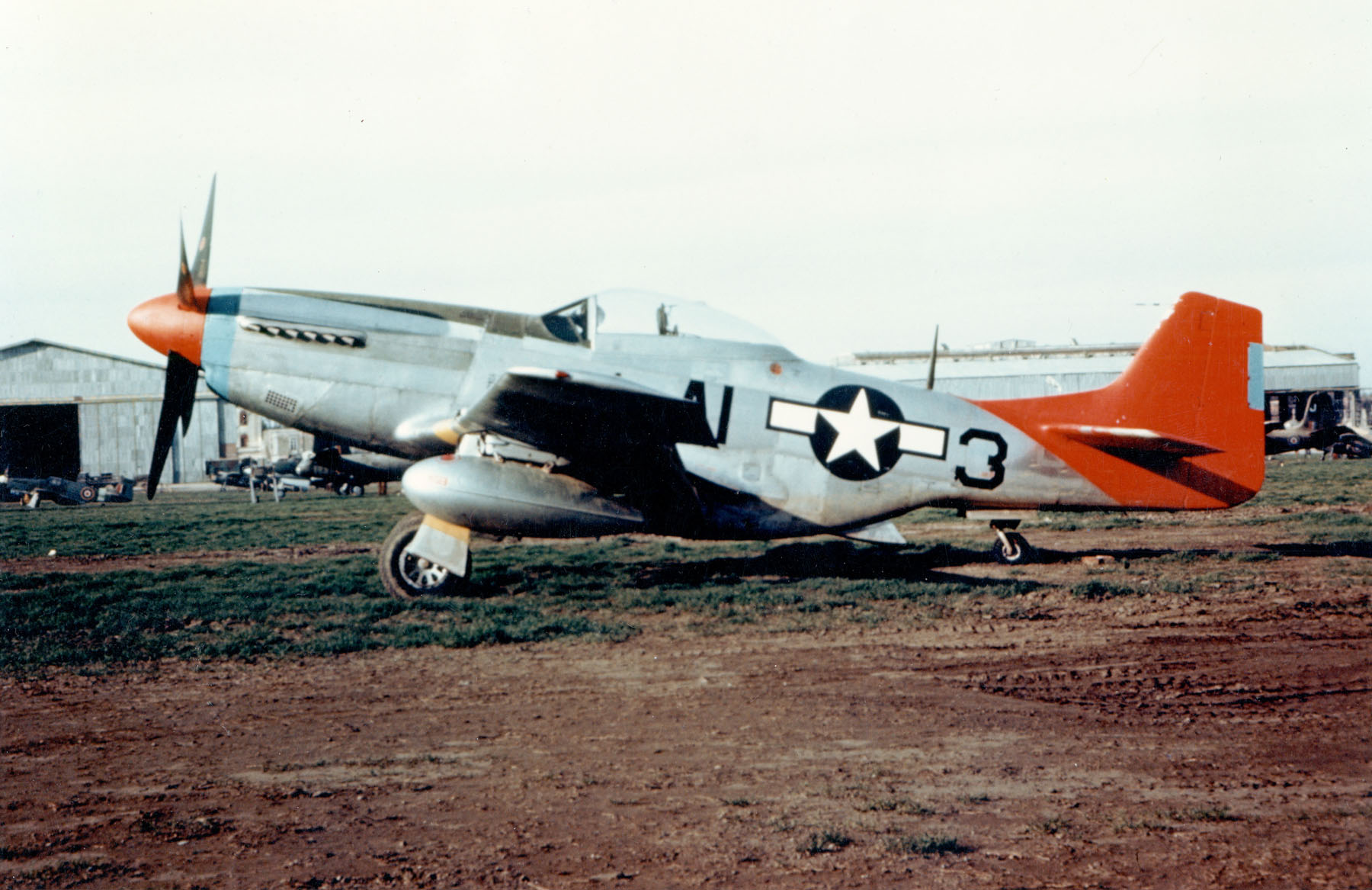
The Tuskegee Airmen's aircraft had distinctive markings that led to the name, "Red Tails." (Note: The red markings that distinguished the Tuskegee Airmen included red bands on the noses of P-51s as well as a red rudder; their P-51B and D Mustangs flew with similar color schemes, with red propeller spinners, yellow wing bands and all-red tail surfaces.)

Bartley graduated as a pilot from Tuskegee in 1943. He was given the rank of 2nd Lieutenant and placed with the 332nd Fighter Group and the 99th Fighter Squadron.

After his service in World War II he joined the Air Force Reserve as a captain in 1946.

== After the war ==
He later worked in real estate. In the 1960s he became the business manager of Edward Waters College. In the 1970s he opened his own real estate office (Bartley Real Estate.

=== Awards ===
- Congressional Gold Medal awarded to the Tuskegee Airmen in 2006

== Education ==
- Old Stanton High School, Class of 1935
- School of Business Administration at Tuskegee Institute in 1939
- Tuskegee University Class of 1943

== See also ==
- Executive Order 9981
- List of Tuskegee Airmen
- Military history of African Americans
