= James B. Knighten =

Tuskegee airman

- James Bernard Knighten
- Born: December 11, 1919; Tulsa, Oklahoma, U.S.
- Died: November 9, 2000 (aged 80); Las Vegas, Nevada, U.S.
- Other name: Jay Bernard
- Occupations: Fighter pilot, comedian
- Known for: Tuskegee Airmen
- Spouse(s): Luana Knighten, Barbara Knighten
- Children: 4 daughters
- Awards: Congressional Gold Medal awarded to the Tuskegee Airmen

James Bernard Knighten (December 11, 1919 – November 9, 2000) was one of the first twelve African-Americans to become a pilot in the United States Army Air Corps after graduating from flight school at the Tuskegee Army Air Field. He became a member of the famed 99th Fighter Squadron, part of the World War II-era group of highly decorated African-American aviators known as the Tuskegee Airmen. Knighten flew in the first combat mission by African American pilots on June 9, 1943. Knighten's military career continued through the Korean and Vietnam Wars. After retiring from the military in 1968, he had a 20-year career with the Federal Aviation Administration as an operations inspector in New York and later in Los Angeles. Known as a jokester through his military career, Knighten began performing as a stand-up comedian in Las Vegas under the name of Jay Bernard during his years at the FAA, finally moving to Las Vegas to perform full-time after retiring from his position with the FAA.

== Biography ==
=== Early life ===
Knighten was born on December 11, 1919, in Tulsa, Oklahoma. His father, a bricklayer, moved the family to St. Louis when Knighten was 14 years old, where he matriculated and subsequently graduated from Charles Sumner High School. He graduated from Dillard University in New Orleans with a Bachelor of Arts in social science.

On May 11, 1938, Knighten was initiated in Kappa Alpha Psi fraternity's Beta Gamma chapter.

=== Military career ===
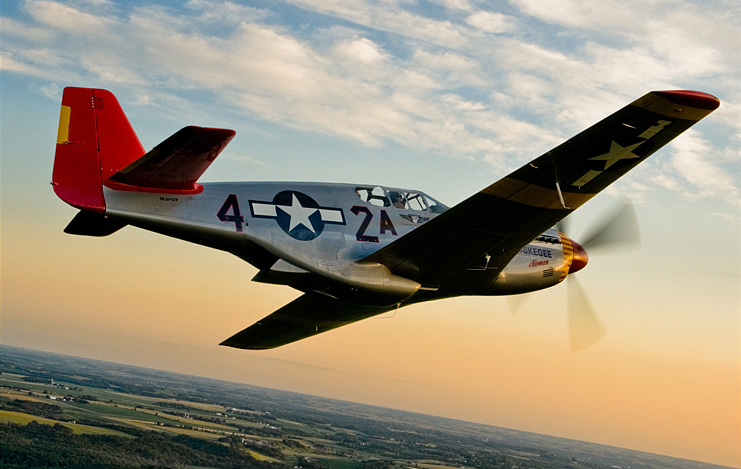
P-51 aircraft with red markings. (Note: The Tuskegee Airmen became known for flying the P-51 aircraft with red markings that distinguished them from other squadrons, this included red bands on the noses of P-51s as well as a red rudder; their P-51B and D Mustangs flew with similar color schemes, with red propeller spinners, yellow wing bands, and all-red tail surfaces.)

After graduating from college, Knighten began working as a waiter on the Santa Fe Railroad route between Chicago and Los Angeles. In 1941, while working for Santa Fe Rail, he heard that African American cadets were going to be accepted into a new pilot training program for the first time in U.S. history. He had already applied for and been accepted into Howard University Law School on scholarship as well as having applied for and been accepted at the Gammon Theological Seminary in Chicago to study theology. He decided to also apply to be a member of the Army Air Corps as a cadet in the new program. Since he was of draft age, Knighten decided to enlist in the Army Air Corps rather than risk being drafted and assigned menial work in one of the other services. He became one of the members of class 42-E-SE, the third group of cadets chosen during the first year that African American cadets were admitted into the U.S. Army Air Corps, at the newly founded Tuskegee Army Air Field and graduated on May 20, 1942 as one of the first 12 African American military pilots in United States history.

After graduating from flight school at Tuskegee Air Field on May 20, 1942, Knighten was commissioned as a 2nd lieutenant and assigned to the 99th Fighter Squadron. Soon thereafter, the 99th Fighter Squadron was stationed in North Africa. Beginning in April 1943, the 99th Fighter Squadron distinguished itself first in missions over North African and subsequently the Italian mainland. Knighten flew 81 missions during World War II - including the first combat mission ever by African American pilots in United States history on June 9, 1943 - and earned himself the nickname "The Eel" for his flying abilities. While he crashlanded during one of these 81 missions, he walked away from the crash unscathed. By the end of World War II, he earned the Air Medal with two oak leaf clusters.

Following World War II, Knighten remained with the Army Air Corps, which became the United States Air Force, and served honorably in both the Korean War and the Vietnam War. By the end of his career in the air force, he had risen to the rank of lieutenant colonel. Knighten retired from military duty in 1968.

=== Marriage and children ===
Knighten married his first wife, Luana Knighten, ca. 1944. An actress, Luana died of a heart attack in 1956 just two days before she was supposed to appear in the play "Take a Giant Leap" on Broadway. Knighten and Luana had two daughters together before her death.

Shortly after Luana's death, he met and married his second wife Barbara, with whom he spent the rest of his life. Knighten and Barbara had two daughters together.

=== Federal Aviation Administration career ===
Upon retiring from the military in 1968, Knighten assumed a position with the Federal Aviation Administration as an operations inspector in New York. He subsequently was transferred to Los Angeles. In total, his career with the FAA spanned 20 years.

=== Comedy career ===
Knighten earned a reputation as a jokester amongst his fellow officers of the 99th Fighter Squadron. As early as 1955, he began appearing sporadically at stand-up comedy clubs in Manhattan and Trenton, New Jersey, where he was stationed at McGuire Field. Following his retirement as an investigator for the Federal Aviation Administration, Knighten launched a career as a comedian. For the next 20 years, he performed as an opening act at such venues as the Debbie Reynolds Hollywood Hotel, the Gold Coast Hotel and Casino, Palace Station and other resorts in the Las Vegas area.

== Death ==
Knighten died of heart failure at the age of 80 in Las Vegas, Nevada on November 9, 2000.

== Legacy ==
- The James B. Knighten Chapter of the Tuskegee Airmen, Inc. was founded in Las Vegas in 1999 and named in his honor.
- A one-act play entitled Tuskegee Love Letters was written based on the letters between Knighten and his first wife during World War II. Knighten's contributions to aviation were memorialized as part of the Black Americans in Flight mural at the Lambert-St. Louis International Airport, which opened on August 13, 1990.

== Awards ==
- Air Medal with two Oak cluster.
- Congressional Gold Medal awarded to Tuskegee Airmen in 2006
- Mobile, Alabama Patriot Award

== See also ==
- Tuskegee Airmen
- List of Tuskegee Airmen Cadet Pilot Graduation Classes
- List of Tuskegee Airmen
- Military history of African Americans
- Dogfights (TV series)
- Executive Order 9981
- The Tuskegee Airmen (movie)
- Red Tails (movie)
