= Willie Rogers (Tuskegee) =

Tuskegee Airman (1915–2016)

Master Sergeant Willie Rogers
- Willie Rogers in 1943
- Born: Willie N. Rogers; April 12, 1915; Apalachicola, Florida, U.S.
- Died: November 18, 2016 (aged 101); St. Petersburg, Florida, U.S.
- Military career
- Branch: United States Army Air Force
- Service years: 1942–1945
- Rank: Master sergeant
- Unit: 100th Fighter Squadron
- Awards: Congressional Gold Medal

MSgt. Willie Rogers (April 12, 1915 – November 18, 2016) (WIA) was a member of the famed group of World War II-era African-Americans known as the Tuskegee Airmen. He was shot twice in Italy during World War II.

== Military service ==
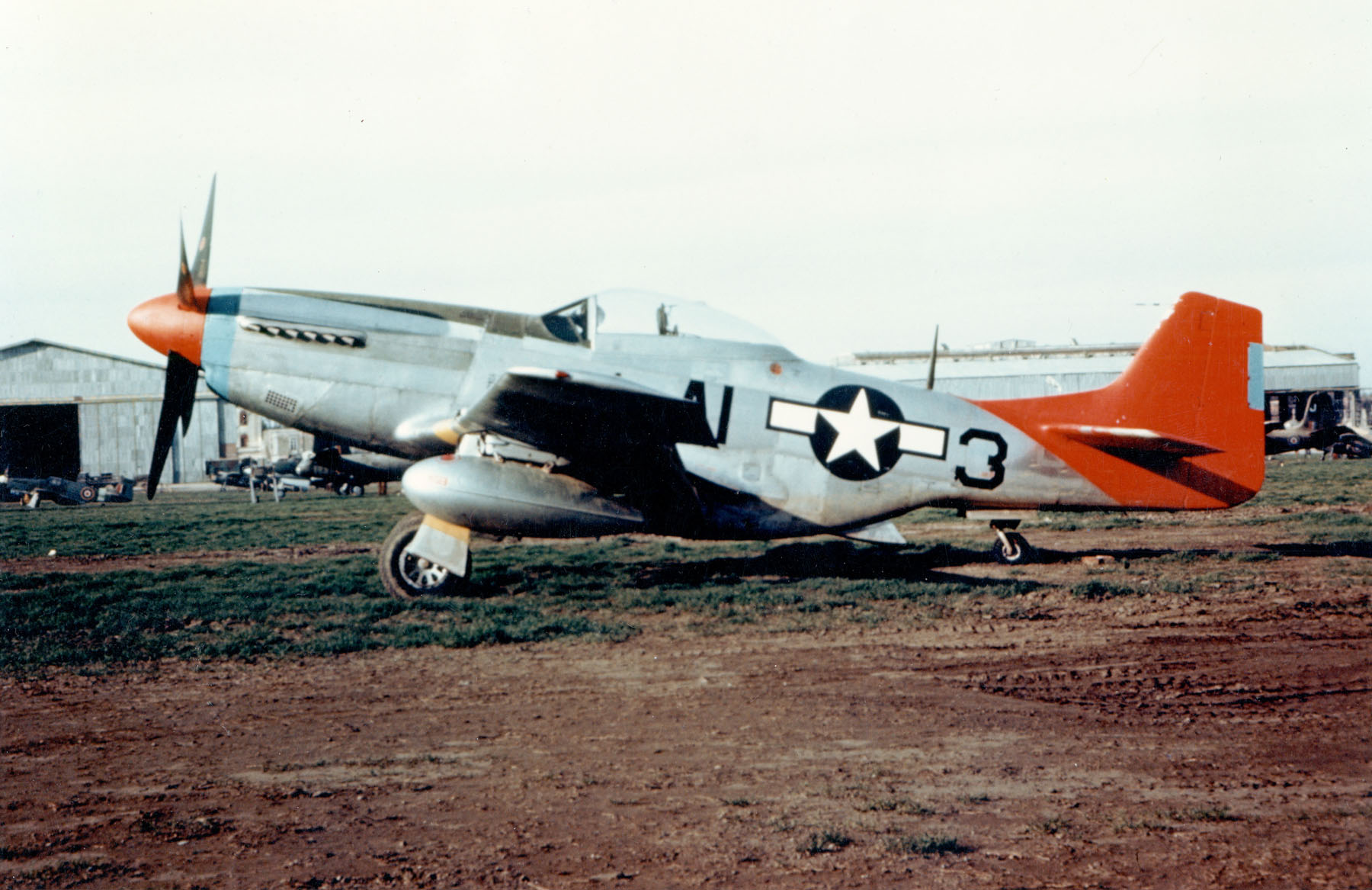
The Tuskegee Airmen's aircraft had distinctive markings that led to the name, "Red Tails." (Note: The red markings that distinguished the Tuskegee Airmen included red bands on the noses of P-51s as well as a red rudder; their P-51B and D Mustangs flew with similar color schemes, with red propeller spinners, yellow wing bands and all-red tail surfaces.)

Rogers was drafted into the United States Army in 1942. He was sent to the European theater of the war, and served in a support role in logistics.

During a mission in Italy in 1943, he was wounded in action. He was shot twice, once in the stomach and once in the leg by German soldiers. Rogers spent several months recovering in a London Hospital.

Rogers arrived at the Dachau concentration camp in Germany shortly after it was liberated by American troops April 29, 1945. He and a contingent of Americans took an inventory of the camp.

Rogers did not tell his family that he was a member of the Tuskegee Airmen until 2012. There is a portrait of Rogers hanging in the St. Petersburg Museum of History.

=== Controversy ===
It was reported that Rogers was part of the 100th Fighter Squadron. However after his death historians were unsure about Rogers place in the history of the Tuskegee airmen. In 2017 it was confirmed that he as part of the 96th Air Service Group providing support to the pilots and air crews. Because Rogers never talked about his service until 2012, the story of his participation with the 100th Fighter Squadron was retold over and over.

=== Awards ===
- Congressional Gold Medal awarded to the Tuskegee Airmen in 2006

== Education ==
- Claflin College of Agriculture and Mechanical Institute
- Tuskegee Institute (1942)

== Personal life ==
Rogers was married and had children. He returned to Florida after WWII and opened Rogers’ Radio Sales and Service in St. Petersburg. He was a lifelong member of the African Methodist Episcopal Church. In 2016 at 101 years old Rogers died of a stroke.

== See also ==
- List of Tuskegee Airmen
- Military history of African Americans
- The Tuskegee Airmen (movie)
