= Thomas Ellis (Tuskegee Airman) =

WWII-era US Army Air Force NCO (1920–2018)

Sergeant Major Thomas Ellis
- Thomas Ellis 1944
- Born: Thomas Marvin Ellis; June 29, 1920
- Died: January 2, 2018 (aged 97); San Antonio, Texas, US
- Burial place: Fort Sam Houston National Cemetery
- Spouse: Janie
- Military career
- Allegiance: United States
- Branch: United States Army Air Force
- Service years: 1942–1945
- Rank: Sergeant Major
- Units: 301st Fighter Squadron; 332nd Fighter Group
- Awards: Congressional Gold Medal awarded to Tuskegee Airmen

Sgt. Major Thomas Ellis (June 29, 1920 – January 2, 2018) from San Antonio, Texas, was a member of the famed group of World War II-era African-Americans known as the Tuskegee Airmen. He served in the 301st Fighter Squadron and the 332nd Fighter Group during WWII.

== Early life and education ==
Ellis grew up in San Antonio, Texas and graduated from Wheatley High School He attended Samuel Huston College in Austin. He married his wife Janie in early 1942.

== Military service ==
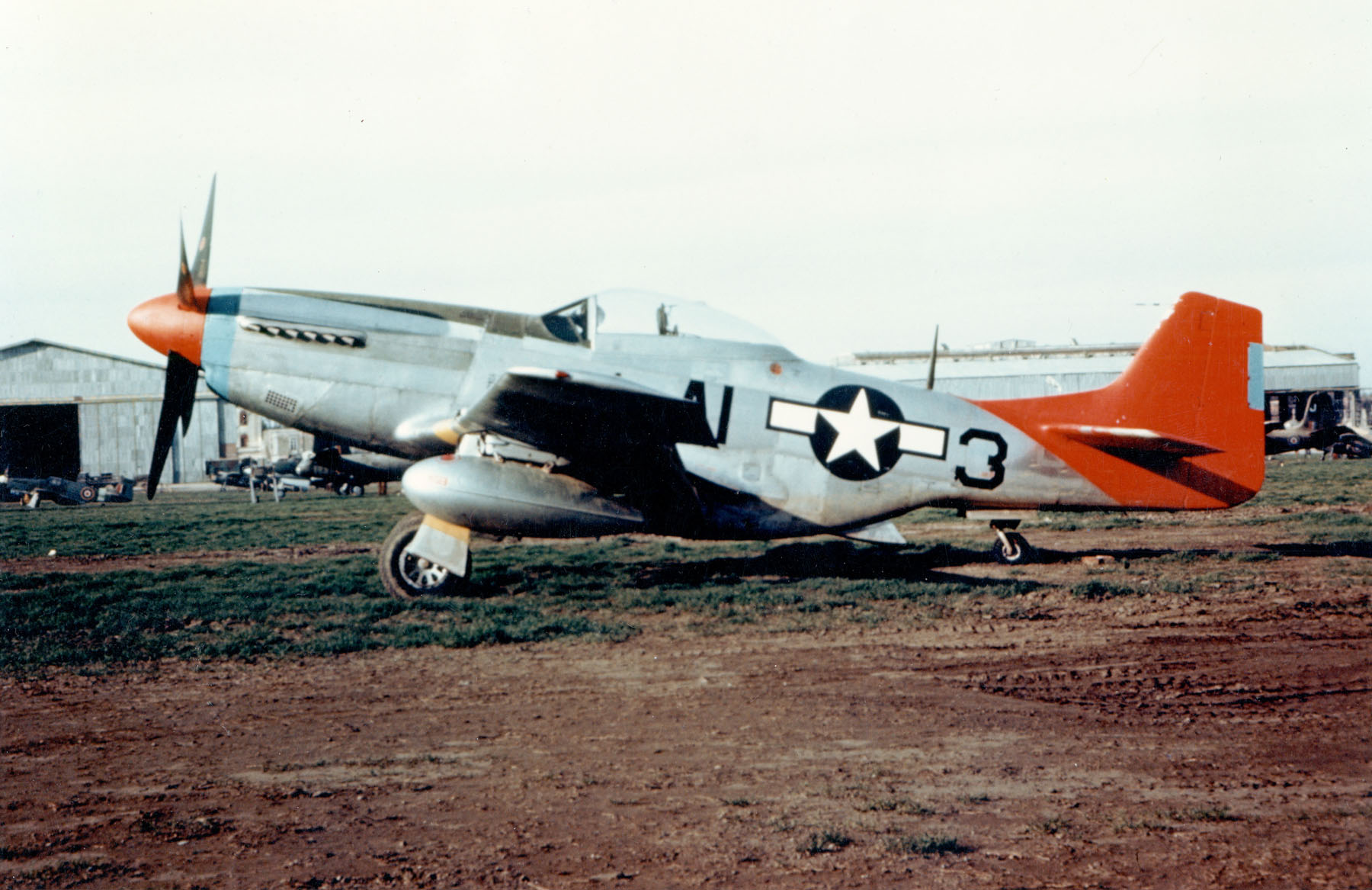
The Tuskegee Airmen's aircraft had distinctive markings that led to the name, "Red Tails." (Note: The red markings that distinguished the Tuskegee Airmen included red bands on the noses of P-51s as well as a red rudder; their P-51B and D Mustangs flew with similar color schemes, with red propeller spinners, yellow wing bands and all-red tail surfaces.)

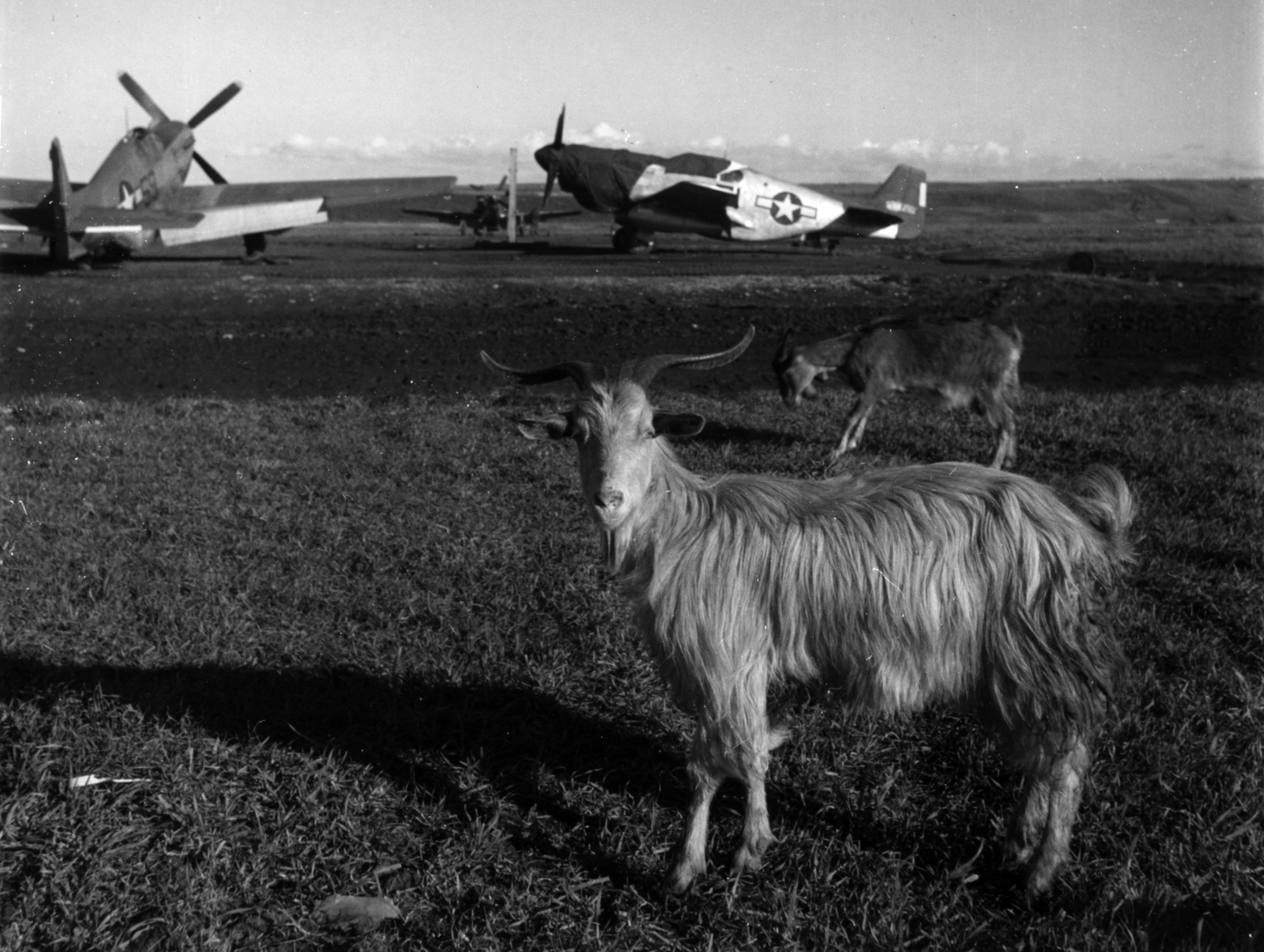
P-51C Mustang fighters from the 332nd Fighter Group at Ramitelli Airfield, with goats (March 1945)

He was drafted into the Army in June 1942 and was sent to basic training in Newport News, VA and in October 1942 he was assigned to Tuskegee with the 99th Fighter Squadron. When Ellis arrived at Tuskegee Army Airfield in 1942 he was the only member 301st Fighter Squadron. In 1944 he was sent to Ramitelli Air Base in Italy with the Tuskegee Airmen 301st Fighter Squadron. He was an administrator and served under Colonel Benjamin O. Davis Jr. with the 332nd Fighter Group's transfer to Taranto, Italy. He achieved the rank of sergeant major and earned seven battle stars. He was discharged in September 1945.

== Later life ==
When he returned from the war he worked as a USPS mail carrier until his retirement in 1984. He died of a stroke January 2, 2018, and was buried at Fort Sam Houston National Cemetery.

== Awards ==
- Congressional Gold Medal awarded to the Tuskegee Airmen in 2006
- Battle Stars (7)

== See also ==
- Executive Order 9981
- List of Tuskegee Airmen
- Military history of African Americans
- Fly (2009 play about the 332d Fighter Group)
- Tuskegee Airmen National Historic Site and museum
