= Vernon Sport =

Tuskegee Airman (1923–2008)

Vernon Kingsley Sport
- Born: July 16, 1923
- Died: September 8, 2008 (aged 85); Conyers, Georgia
- Military career
- Allegiance: United States of America
- Branch: United States Army Air Corps
- Rank: Captain squad commander
- Unit: Tuskegee Airmen
- Conflicts: World War II
- Awards: Congressional Gold Medal awarded to Tuskegee Airmen
- Other work: President of the Brockton area naacp

Vernon Kingsley Sport (July 16, 1923 – September 8, 2008) was an American military aviator and member of the Tuskegee Airmen during World War II. In later life he worked for the cause of affirmative action.

== Early life ==
Vernon Sport enlisted in the U.S. Army Air Corps immediately after graduating from high school. He requested a posting at Moton Field in Tuskegee, Alabama, the home field of the Tuskegee Airmen. Each time, he was turned down for lacking a college degree. In retrospect, "it was an exercise in determination. He continuously requested to try out for the airmen. He didn’t have a college education at that time, but he was very well-read," Dr. Alfred Wyatt, Sport's son-in-law, would note later. Eventually, he would prevail, rising to the rank of captain squad commander. After leaving the Air Corps, Sport would earn a bachelor's degree from Suffolk University and a master's degree from Goddard College.

== Later life ==
Sport moved to Massachusetts, where he worked in the state courts as an affirmative action officer, helping to ensure equal access for African-Americans. He also served on the boards of such notable organizations as the NAACP, the American Heart Association and the American Cancer Society. His son-in-law would later recount, "I think the experience of being with the Tuskegee Airmen prepared him to be a leader."

Sport retired and moved to Conyers, Georgia, in 1988, but that didn't stop him from helping others. He worked with an Atlanta-area charity, the Angels of Mercy, which provided food and support to homeless persons, for many years. In 2006 the Tuskegee Airmen, were awarded the Congressional Gold Medal for their service.

Vernon Sport died in Conyers, Georgia, on September 8, 2008, of complications from Alzheimer's disease. He was survived by his wife, three sisters and four children.

== See also ==
- Executive Order 9981
- List of Tuskegee Airmen
- Military history of African Americans
- The Tuskegee Airmen (movie)
- Tuskegee Airmen
