= Robert Searcy =

Tuskegee Airman (1921–2009)

- Searcy in uniform during World War II
- Born: 1921; Mount Pleasant, Texas
- Died: September 17, 2009 (aged 88); Atlanta, Georgia
- Military career
- Allegiance: United States of America
- Branch: United States Army Air Forces
- Conflicts: World War II

Robert J. Searcy (1921 – September 17, 2009) was a member of the Tuskegee Airmen, a group of African American military personnel who served with distinction during World War II as the 332nd Fighter Group of the US Army Air Corps. After the war, Searcy lived in Los Angeles, California. He died of colorectal cancer in September 2009 at age 88.

== Tuskegee Airmen ==
Searcy was born in Mount Pleasant, Texas, and attended Prairie View A&M University before enlisting in the U.S. Army Air Corps in 1942 following the United States' entry into World War II. Searcy received basic training at Ft. Hood, Texas, and was assigned to lead a group of airmen to Tuskegee, Alabama. He later recalled receiving his first taste of segregation when his men were denied access to the Pullman car's dining and sleeping quarters on the train to Tuskegee. Searcy demanded passage, and the porters, most of whom were African-American, eventually agreed to allow them to pass. Searcy recalled, "I was put in charge of those men. I felt I had to represent what the Constitution was for those men. That's what leadership is." Searcy served with the Tuskegee Airmen in Italy, France, the Balkans, the Rhineland, and elsewhere in Europe between 1942 and 1945. He received commendations for supporting combat missions over Europe, North Africa and the Middle East, and was honorably discharged in 1945.

== Post-war years ==
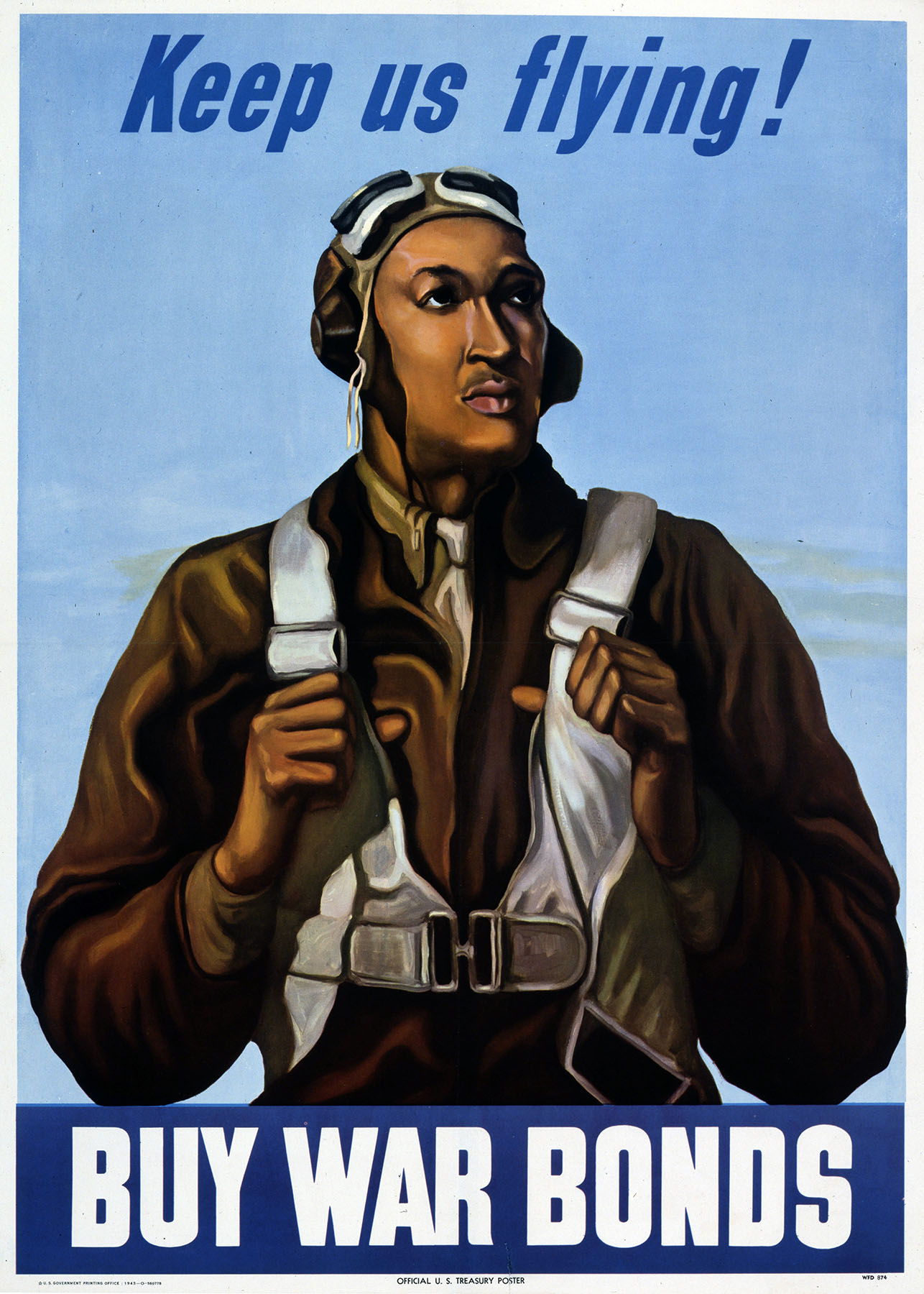
Fundraising poster featuring the Tuskegee Airmen.

Searcy later recalled that he tried for years "to forget serving as a Tuskegee Airman" and thought of his service in the segregated U.S. military "as two years, 10 months and 27 days lost." He had enlisted hoping to become a pilot, but he was assigned to work in a support position as a clerk in military intelligence. He had hoped to become a doctor before the war, but did not complete college after the war. After the war, Searcy worked for United Airlines cleaning aircraft in the 1950s. He also worked at a U.S. Post office in downtown Los Angeles and sold women's clothing. He also opened several clothing stores in Los Angeles, California. Searcy married, but had no children. His wife died in an automobile accident in 1990. Searcy was a resident of Van Nuys, Los Angeles, California, in his later years.

== Attendance at Barack Obama's inauguration ==
Despite being a Republican, Searcy supported the candidacy of Barack Obama, encouraging others at his Van Nuys retirement home to vote for Obama. Obama invited all of the living Tuskegee Airmen to his inauguration, and a Mississippi ophthalmologist, Dr. Lynn McMahan, flew Searcy and three other Tuskegee Airmen to Washington, D.C., in his private jet. In agreeing to fly the men, McMahan said, "The Tuskegee Airmen are to pilots like Michael Jordan is to basketball, and Tiger Woods is to golf." In video footage from the Chicago Tribune, Searcy says of Obama's inauguration, "When I leave this earth, I leave it with a smile on my face."

== Death ==
Searcy died of colorectal cancer in September 2009 at age 88 while visiting his granddaughter in Atlanta, Georgia.

== See also ==
- Dogfights (TV series)
- Executive Order 9981
- Freeman Field Mutiny
- List of Tuskegee Airmen
- Military history of African Americans
- The Tuskegee Airmen (movie)

== Bibliography ==
- Bucholtz, Chris (2007). 332nd Fighter Group Tuskegee Airmen. Osprey Publishing Company. ISBN 978-1-84603-044-4.
- Francis, Charles E. (1997). The Tuskegee Airmen The Men who Changed a Nation. Branden Books. ISBN 978-0-8283-2029-0.
