= Charles Crenchaw =

Mountaineer and Tuskegee Airmen flight engineer (1921–1998)

Charles Madison Crenchaw (September 11, 1921 – October 27, 1998) was an African American mountaineer and veteran flight engineer. On July 9, 1964, he became the first African American to summit Denali, the highest peak in North America.

Prior to the historic climb, achieved as a member of a climb with The Mountaineers, Crenchaw served as a master sergeant in the U.S. Army Air Corps. As flight engineer he was in charge of maintenance for airplanes flown by the Tuskegee Airmen. His service was an experiment designed to demonstrate that black pilots could serve with distinction as officers and in combat.

Crenchaw attended Morehouse College under the GI Bill, then the University of Chicago Graduate School of Engineering after his service. He majored in industrial management, and worked for the Boeing Aircraft Company in Seattle in quality control for several key components of the Apollo space program.

Crenchaw lived most of his life in the Pacific Northwest, where he developed an interest in climbing. In 1961 he joined the Seattle Mountaineers. In 1963 he was invited by team leader Alvin E. Randall to be part of an expedition the following year to climb Denali via the Karstens Ridge. A team of 15 including Crenchaw reached the summit on July 9, 1964. It was the largest single group (18 climb) to attempt Denali. It also had the largest number of women (three) to reach the summit in a single party.

Crenchaw's mountaineering pursuits are closely tied with the Civil Rights Movement. The March on Washington was featured in the November 1963 edition of Ebony magazine. The same edition featured a story on an aspiring black mountaineer named Crenchaw. In 2013, a team of all African American climbers, known as Expedition Denali, used Crenchaw as inspiration as they attempted to follow his footsteps to the summit of Denali.
