= Thomas Franklin Vaughns =

Tuskegee Airman (born 1920)

Sergeant first class Thomas Franklin Vaughns
- Born: July 7, 1920 (age 106); Pine Bluff, Arkansas, U.S.
- Relatives: Luvada
- Military career
- Allegiance: United States of America
- Branch: United States Army Air Force
- Service years: 1942–1952
- Rank: Sergeant first class
- Awards: Congressional Gold Medal awarded to the Tuskegee Airmen (2006); National Defense Service Medal (2019)

Sergeant First Class Thomas Franklin Vaughns (born July 7, 1920) is an American veteran who was a member of the famed group of World War II-era African-Americans known as the Tuskegee Airmen. He is a recipient of the National Defense Service Medal in 2019, for his service in the Korean War. He is also a member of the Arkansas Agriculture Hall of Fame.

== Military service ==
=== World War II ===
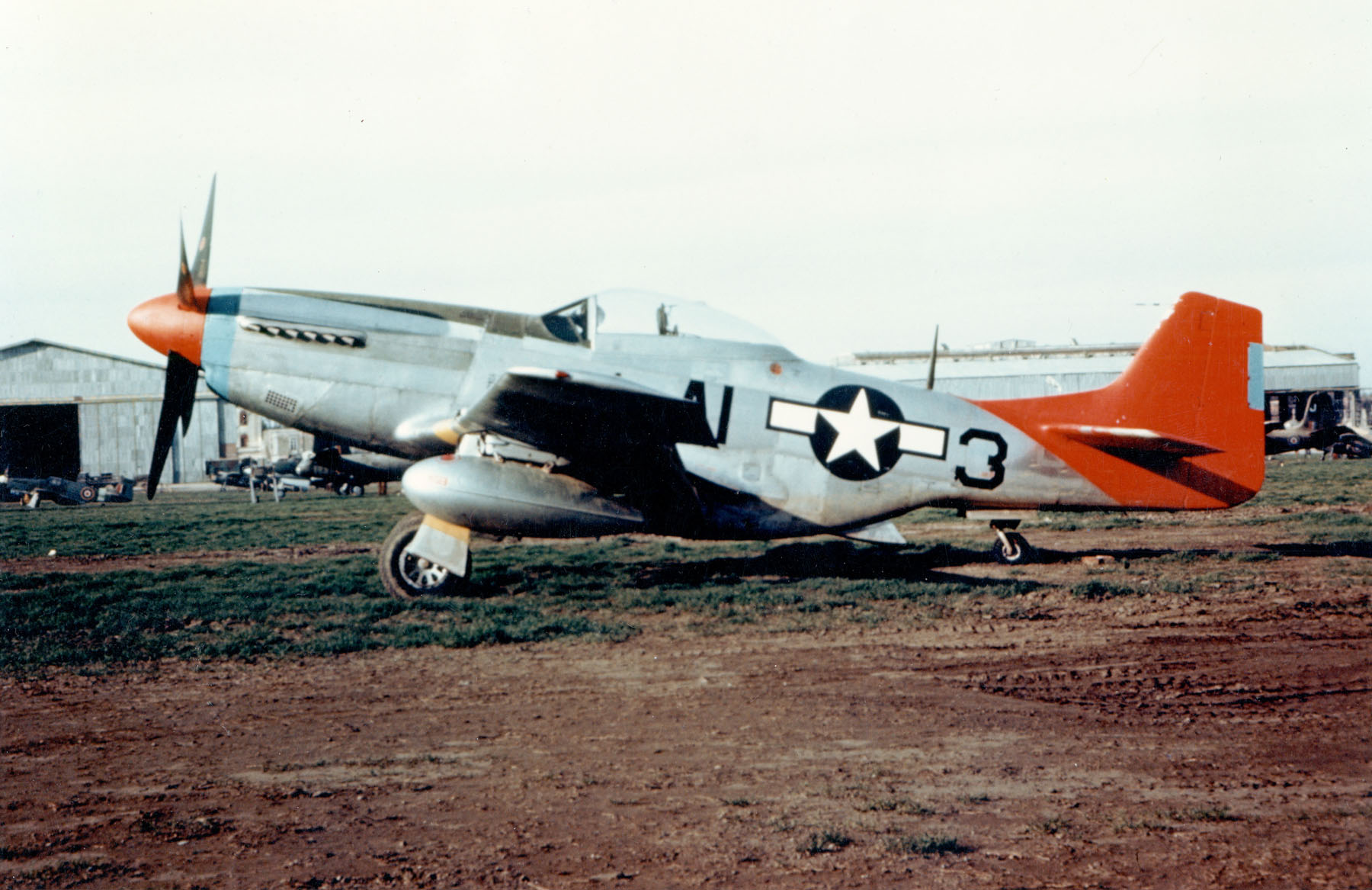
The Tuskegee Airmen's aircraft had distinctive markings that led to the name, "Red Tails". (Note: The red markings that distinguished the Tuskegee Airmen included red bands on the noses of P-51s as well as a red rudder; their P-51B and D Mustangs flew with similar color schemes, with red propeller spinners, yellow wing bands and all-red tail surfaces.)

Vaughns was drafted his senior year of high school. In 1942 reported for duty at Camp Robinson. He was sent to basic training in Bakersfield, California. Vaughns was trained to be a mechanic for B-25 bombers. He was then transferred to Tuskegee along with 18 others.

=== Korean War ===
Vaughns signed up for the Army Reserves and when the Korean War began he was sent to Fort Hood where he served as a mechanic. In 1952 he was discharged as a Sergeant First Class.

== Early life ==
Vaughns family owned a 50-acre farm in Felton, in rural Lee County, Arkansas. He attended Marianna High School in Arkansas. On July 12, 2020, for Vaughn's 100th birthday 5 days earlier, a drive-by parade honoring him took place. The parade was organized by the church he attends: Barraque Street Missionary Baptist Church.

=== Awards ===
- Congressional Gold Medal awarded to the Tuskegee Airmen in 2006
- World War II Victory Medal
- American Campaign Medal
- National Defense Service Medal (2019)
- Arkansas Agriculture Hall of Fame (2020)

== Education ==
- Marianna High School
- Arkansas Agricultural, Mechanical & Normal College
- University of Arkansas

== Personal life ==
After World War II Vaughns returned home to Pine Bluff, Arkansas. There he worked in education. He also worked monitoring 4-H Club members. After the war, he attended college and married Luvada. He signed up for the Army Reserves and when the Korean War began he was sent to Fort Hood. In the 1950s he set up a program for farmers to sell their produce in Crittenden County, Arkansas and later in Pine Bluff, Arkansas. His programs provided employment for 1,400 people. He spent the rest of his career occupied with teaching agricultural farming techniques.

== See also ==
- Executive Order 9981
- Military history of African Americans
- The Tuskegee Airmen (movie)
