= Earl N. Franklin =

Tuskegee Airman (1917–2003)

Earl Newlan Franklin
- Born: January 26, 1917; Joliet, Illinois
- Died: November 11, 2003 (aged 86) Cherry Hill, New Jersey
- Buried: Arlington National Cemetery
- Allegiance: United States of America
- Branch: United States Air Force
- Service years: 1938–1973
- Rank: Colonel
- Conflicts: Second World War; Korean War; Vietnam War
- Spouse: Marion T. Franklin (nee Hall)
- Children: 1 (James M.)

Colonel Earl Newlan Franklin (January 26, 1917 – November 11, 2003) was born in Joliet, Illinois. He is one of the original Tuskegee Airmen, along with his brother George.

Franklin was a graduate of the second Tuskegee class and stayed on the base as a flight instructor and pilot. He saw active service in Germany, France and Greece.

In the early 1970s Franklin acted as the Regional Exchange Commander in Vietnam. He also served as Chief of the Air Force Services Office in Philadelphia. A role from which he retired after 35 years of service.

Franklin was married to Marion T. Franklin (née Hall). They had a son, James M. Franklin and grandson, James E. Franklin. He was step-grandfather to Shaney. His siblings were Bertha McDonald, Odis Franklin, Donzanella Spivie and Donald Franklin.

Franklin resided in Cherry Hill, New Jersey from 1968 until his death on Veterans Day 2003. He is buried in Arlington National Cemetery.
