= Yenwith K. Whitney =

Tuskegee Airman and aeronautical engineer (1924–2011)

Yenwith Whitney
- Born: December 22, 1924; New York, New York
- Died: April 12, 2011 (aged 86); Sarasota, Florida
- Burial place: Mount Hope Cemetery, Sarasota, New York
- Military career
- Allegiance: United States of America
- Branch: United States Army Air Corps
- Unit: 301st fighter squadron
- Conflicts: World War II
- Awards: Air Medal with three Clusters

Yenwith K. Whitney (December 22, 1924 – April 12, 2011) was a fighter pilot with the Tuskegee Airmen in World War II, as an aeronautical engineer, and educator.

== World War II ==
In 1943 Whitney enlisted in the United States Army Air Corps and was transferred to the 66th Air Force Flying School at Alabama's Tuskegee Institute (now known as Tuskegee University). He became a member of the Tuskegee Airmen, as part of the 301st Fighter Squadron. Whitney flew 34 combat missions in Europe during World War II and was awarded the Air Medal with three Oak Leaf Clusters.

== Education and career ==
When the war ended, Whitney attended the Massachusetts Institute of Technology to study aeronautical engineering. While at MIT, Whitney was one of four student delegates chosen to represent the Institute at the annual convention of the US National Student Association (NSA). He was also a member of the MIT Flying Club.

After receiving his degree, Whitney worked as an aeronautical engineer at Republic Aircraft and the EDO Corporation before beginning a life of service to the Presbyterian Church. He spent ten years teaching math and physics at a mission in Cameroon, then returned to the US as Associate for Educational Services in the Presbyterian Church. He also briefly served as principal at Boggs Academy in Keysville, Georgia. He retired from his work with the Presbyterian Church in 1992.

After retirement, Whitney spoke with various groups about his experiences as a Tuskegee Airman and was active with the MIT Alumni Association, where he was involved on their national selection committee.
