= List of Tuskegee Airmen Cadet Pilot Graduation Classes =

This is a chronological list of Tuskegee Airmen Cadet Pilot Graduation Classes from 1942 to 1946.

The Tuskegee Airmen /tʌsˈkiːɡiː/ were a group of primarily African American military pilots (fighter and bomber) and airmen who fought in World War II. They formed the 99th Fighter Squadron, the 332nd Expeditionary Operations Group and the 477th Bombardment Group of the United States Army Air Forces. The name also applies to the navigators, bombardiers, mechanics, instructors, crew chiefs, nurses, cooks and other support personnel.

This list compiles all documented cadet pilot graduates who trained at the Tuskegee Army Air Field, Moton Field, and other locations prior to the U.S. Air Force's deactivation of all-African American Air units. There are 1007 documented Tuskegee Airmen Pilots.

This list includes training in the Tuskegee Aviation Cadet School's three cadet programs:

- Single-Engine Cadet Pilot Class (i.e. trained to fly Bell P-39 Airacobra, Curtiss P-40 Warhawk, Republic P-47 Thunderbolt, North American P-51 Mustang or similar single engine combat fighter aircraft);
- Twin-Engine Cadet Pilot Class (i.e. trained to fly the North American B-25 Mitchell, or
- Liaison Pilot Cadet Class (i.e. training to serve as liaison and service pilots).

This list excludes:

- Individuals in non-pilot, support operations.
- Anyone who may have attended the Tuskegee Airmen cadet pilot program but failed to graduate. Such individuals were often pejoratively deemed as "washed out". Some "washed out" cadets were transferred to the 477th Bombardment Group, Tuskegee's "bomber boys". The 477th comprised four squadrons of B-25 Mitchell bombers, stationed at Hondo Army Air Field in Texas. This group did not see combat in World War II. On October 25, 1943, the inaugural group of "washed out" Tuskegee Airmen arrived at Hondo.

== Graduating Cadet Class – Single Engine Section – SE-42-C – March 7, 1942 ==
- 2nd Lt Lemuel R. Custis
- Captain Benjamin O. Davis Jr.
- 2nd Lt Charles DeBow
- 2nd Lt George S. Roberts
- 2nd Lt Mac Ross

== Graduating Cadet Class – Single Engine Section – SE-42-D – April 29, 1942 ==
- 2nd Lt Sidney P. Brooks
- 2nd Lt Charles W. Dryden
- 2nd Lt Clarence C. Jamison

== Graduating Cadet Class – Single Engine Section – SE-42-E – May 20, 1942 ==
- 2nd Lt James B. Knighten
- 2nd Lt George L. Knox II, listed as George L. Knox
- 2nd Lt Lee Rayford
- 2nd Lt Sherman W. White Jr. †

== Graduating Cadet Class – Single Engine Section – SE-42-F – July 3, 1942 ==
- 2nd Lt. Willie Ashley
- 2nd Lt. George R. Bolling
- 2nd Lt. William A. Campbell, listed as William A. Campbell
- 2nd Lt. Herbert Carter, listed as Herbert E. Carter
- 2nd Lt. Herbert V. Clark (WIA)
- 2nd Lt. Charles B. Hall
- 2nd Lt. Allen G. Lane
- 2nd Lt. Erwin B. Lawrence Jr.
- 2nd Lt. Faythe A. McGinnis
- 2nd Lt. Paul G. Mitchell
- 2nd Lt. Louis Purnell, listed as Louis R. Purnell
- 2nd Lt. Graham Smith, listed as Graham Smith
- 2nd Lt. Spann Watson
- 2nd Lt. James T. Wiley

== Graduating Cadet Class – Single Engine Section – SE-42-G – August 5, 1942 ==
- 2nd Lt Richard C. Davis †, killed in action on January 30, 1943.
- 2nd Lt Willie H. Fuller, listed as Willie Fuller. Not to be confused with Flight Officer William A. Fuller Jr. of Single Engine Section Cadet Class SE-45-E, August 4, 1945)
- 2nd Lt Cassius C.A. Harris
- 2nd Lt Earl E. King ("Wamba" King) †, killed in action on March 12, 1943. The Tuskegee Airmen's third ever casualty
- 2nd Lt Walter I. Lawson
- 2nd Lt John McClure, listed as John M. McClure. Actual name is John William McClure
- 2nd Lt Leon C. Roberts
- 2nd Lt John W. Rogers Sr.

== Graduating Cadet Class – Single Engine Section – SE-42-H – September 6, 1942 ==
- 2nd Lt Samuel M. Bruce †, killed in action January 27, 1944
- 2nd Lt Richard C. Caesar
- 2nd Lt Robert W. Deiz
- 2nd Lt Joseph Elsberry, listed as Joseph D. Elsberry
- 2nd Lt Wilmore B. Leonard, known professionally as 'W.B. Leonard'
- 2nd Lt James L. McCullin, killed on July 2, 1943.
- 2nd Lt John H. Morgan
- 2nd Lt Henry B. Perry
- 2nd Lt Edward L. Toppins

== Graduating Cadet Class – Single Engine Section – SE-42-I – October 9, 1942 ==
- 2nd Lt Nathaniel M. Hill, killed 1943 in a plane crash in thick fog with weather officer and 2nd Lt. Luther L. Blakeney
- 2nd Lt Herman A. Lawson
- 2nd Lt William T. Mattison, killed January 28, 1951 piloting U.S. Air Force C-45F "Expeditor" #44-87287 in a weather-related crash near Oak Harbor, Ohio.
- 2nd Lt Price D. Rice
- 2nd Lt Andrew D. Turner

== Graduating Cadet Class – Single Engine Section – SE-42-J – November 10, 1942 ==
- 2nd Lt Howard Baugh
- 2nd Lt Terry J. Charlton Jr., listed as Terry J. Charlton
- 2nd Lt Jerome Edwards, listed as Jerome T. Edwards
- 2nd Lt Melvin T. Jackson

== Graduating Cadet Class – Single Engine Section – SE-42-K – December 13, 1942 ==
- 2nd Lt Edward C. Gleed
- 2nd Lt Milton T. Hall, killed September 18, 1947 when his AT-6 plane collided with another plane during practice exercise.
- 2nd Lt Wendell O. Pruitt
- 2nd Lt Richard C. Pulliam
- 2nd Lt Robert B. Tresville Jr. (MIA)
- 2nd Lt Peter C. Verwayne, killed June 3, 1958 in East Farmingdale, New York in aircraft accident
- 2nd Lt William H. Walker, killed in mid-air collision with 2nd Lt. LeRoi S, Williams on October 14, 1943, near Selfridge Field, Michigan (This is not accurate, Lt. William H. Walker was not killed in air see foot note number 64) HR0232 90th General Assembly
- 2nd Lt Romeo M. Williams

== Graduating Cadet Class – Single Engine Section – SE-43-A – January 13, 1943 ==
- 2nd Lt Andrew Maples Jr. (MIA), missing in action June 26, 1944 over the Adriatic Sea while serving in combat with the 301st Fighter Squadron.
- 2nd Lt George T. McCrumby (MIA), declared dead February 29, 1944 after air crash in the Mediterranean
- 2nd Lt Armour G. McDaniel (WIA) (POW)
- 2nd Lt Clinton B. Mills
- 2nd Lt Charles R. Stanton
- 2nd Lt Quitman C. Walker, declared dead on November 19, 1944. Incident location: Hungary.

== Graduating Cadet Class – Single Engine Section – SE-43-B – February 16, 1943 ==
- 2nd Lt Walter M. Downs
- 2nd Lt Claude B. Govan
- 2nd Lt William E. Griffin
- 2nd Lt James R. Polkinghorne (MIA), declared missing in action on May 5, 1944; plane and body never found
- 2nd Lt John H. Prowell (MIA), declared dead after missing in action April 25, 1944 from convoy patrol 30 miles SSW La Cosa
- 2nd Lt Roy M. Spencer

== Graduating Cadet Class – Single Engine Section – SE-43-C – March 25, 1943 ==
- 2nd Lt. Clarence W. Allen
- 2nd Lt. Leroy Bowman
- 2nd Lt. Woodrow Crockett, listed as Woodrow W. Crockett
- 2nd Lt. Alfonza W. Davis (MIA) (WIA)
- 2nd Lt. Lawrence Dickson, listed as Lawrence E. Dickson
- 2nd Lt. Alwayne M. Dunlap †, killed on February 21, 1944, when his aircraft overshot a landing strip on a beachhead in Anzio, Italy, crashing.
- 2nd Lt. Elmer A. Gordon
- 2nd Lt. William M. Gordon
- 2nd Lt. Clarence F. Jamerson
- 2nd Lt. Walter L. McCreary (POW)
- 2nd Lt. Pearlee E. Sanders
- 2nd Lt. Wilmeth Sidat-Singh
- 2nd Lt. Lloyd G. Singletary

== Graduating Cadet Class – Single Engine Section – SE-43-D – April 29, 1943 ==
- 2nd Lt. Paul Adams
- 2nd Lt. Charles P. Bailey
- 2nd Lt. James E. Brothers
- 2nd Lt. James Y. Carter
- 2nd Lt. Arnold W. Cisco, killed on May 19, 1946, when his transport plane hit power lines during a storm, crashing near Tuskegee, Alabama
- 2nd Lt. Wilson V. Eagleson
- 2nd Lt. William J. Faulkner (MIA), presumed dead after crashing over Austria on November 6, 1944
- 2nd Lt. Walter T. Foreman
- 2nd Lt. Vernon V. Haywood
- 2nd Lt. Heber C. Houston
- 2nd Lt. Freddie E. Hutchins
- 2nd Lt. Leonard M. Jackson
- 2nd Lt. Sidney J. Mosley
- 2nd Lt. Curtis C. Robinson
- 2nd Lt. Harold E. Sawyer
- 2nd Lt. Lewis C. Smith
- 2nd Lt. Ulysses S. Taylor
- 2nd Lt. Luke J. Weathers
- 2nd Lt. Charles L. Williams

== Graduating Cadet Class – Single Engine Section – SE-43-E – May 28, 1943 ==
- 2nd Lt John F. Briggs
- 2nd Lt Milton R Brooks
- 2nd Lt Charles M. Bussey
- 2nd Lt Spurgeon N. Ellington
- 2nd Lt Maurice V. Esters, declared dead after forced to bail from his plane over the Adriatic Sea when his engine failed on June 26, 1944
- 2nd Lt Clemenceau M. Giving, drowned in Naples Harbor in Italy on March 18, 1944, after bailing from mechanically failing aircraft; became tangled in his parachute causing him to drown; body recovered by an Italian fisherman
- 2nd Lt Joseph P. Gomer
- 2nd Lt George E Gray †, killed April 5, 1951 in Pyongyang, North Korea during a combat aerial firing pass at extremely close range; aircraft struck the ground, exploded and disintegrated.
- 2nd Lt John L. Hamilton
- 2nd Lt Langdon E. Johnson †, killed on August 12, 1944, when his aircraft was hit by flak after strafing enemy radar stations at Marseilles, France; crashed into sea
- 2nd Lt Felix J. Kirkpatrick
- 2nd Lt Albert H. Manning
- 2nd Lt Oliver O. Miller
- 2nd Lt Dempsey W. Morgan
- 2nd Lt Harry A. Sheppard
- 2nd Lt Luther H. Smith
- 2nd Lt John J. Suggs
- 2nd Lt James A. Walker

== Graduating Cadet Class – Single Engine Section – SE-43-F – June 30, 1943 ==
- 2nd Lt. Robert R. Alexander
- 2nd Lt. Alexander M. Bright
- 2nd Lt. Weldon K. Groves
- 2nd Lt. Charles McGee, listed as Charles E McGee
- 2nd Lt. Herbert S Harris
- 2nd Lt. Richard H. Harris
- 2nd Lt. Milton R. Henry
- 2nd Lt. Willie S. Hunter
- 2nd Lt. Wilbert H. Johnson
- 2nd Lt. Oscar A. Kenney †, killed in action, son of prominent physician, John A. Kenney Sr.
- 2nd Lt. Lacy Hezekiah
- 2nd Lt. Joe A. Lewis

== Graduating Cadet Class – Single Engine Section – SE-43-G – July 28, 1943 ==
- 2nd Lt. Lee Archer
- 2nd Lt. Harry L. Bailey
- 2nd Lt. William Bartley
- 2nd Lt. Raymond Cassagnol, Haitian cadet
- 2nd Lt. Samuel L. Curtis
- 2nd Lt. John Daniels
- 2nd Lt. William B. Ellis
- 2nd Lt. William W. Green Jr.
- 2nd Lt. George B. Greenlee Jr
- 2nd Lt. Richard W. Hall (“Dopey” Hall). Not to be confused with DOTA Richard Hall, Chief Master Sergeant
- 2nd Lt. Jack D Holsclaw
- 2nd Lt. Daniel "Chappie" James Jr., listed as Daniel James Jr.
- 2nd Lt. John H. Leahr
- 2nd Lt. Claybourne A. Lockett
- 2nd Lt. James W. Mason
- 2nd Lt. Eddie McLaurin
- 2nd Lt. William R. Melton
- 2nd Lt. Robert H Nelson
- 2nd Lt. Maurice R. Page
- 2nd Lt. G. Rogers
- 2nd Lt. Edward M. Smith
- 2nd Lt. Lowell Steward, listed as Lowell C. Steward
- 2nd Lt. Edward W. Taylor
- 2nd Lt. Alva Temple
- 2nd Lt. Walter D. Westmoreland †, killed on October 13, 1944; plane shot down by enemy ground fire near Lake Balaton, Hungary
- 2nd Lt. Robert H. Wiggins †, killed during escort mission to Vienna, Austria oil refinery on Oct. 7, 1944; plane hit by anti-aircraft fire; eventually crashed in the Adriatic Sea.
- 2nd Lt. LeRoi S. Williams, killed in mid-air collision with 2nd Lt William H. Walker on October 14, 1943, near Selfridge Field, Michigan; brother of Tuskegee Airmen cadet graduate Eugene Williams
- 2nd Lt. Beryl Wyatt, killed April 18, 1944 when his plane crashed after an attempted landing.

== Graduating Cadet Class – Single Engine Section – SE-43-H – August 30, 1943 ==
- 2nd Lt Alton F Ballard
- 2nd Lt Hubron R. Blackwell
- 2nd Lt Everett A. Bratcher
- 2nd Lt Harry J. Daniels, declared dead after non-hostile aerial crash in Italy on May 18, 1945.
- 2nd Lt Andrew H. Doswell
- 2nd Lt Charles A. Dunne
- 2nd Lt Smith W. Green
- 2nd Lt William E. Hill
- 2nd Lt Lawrence B. Jefferson
- 2nd Lt Samuel Jefferson, presumed dead after aircraft crashed near Corsica on June 24, 1944.
- 2nd Lt Hubert L. Jones
- 2nd Lt William B. McClenic Jr.
- Alix Pasquet, Haitian Cadet
- 2nd Lt Starling B. Penn
- 2nd Lt Leon Purchase
- 2nd Lt Roger Romine
- 2nd Lt Norvel Stoudmire †, killed March 31, 1944, when his parachute got snagged after his plane caught fire during a harbor patrol mission in Italy.
- 2nd Lt Charles W. Tate
- 2nd Lt George A. Taylor
- 2nd Lt Floyd A. Thompson
- 2nd Lt Carroll S. Woods
- 2nd Lt Willard L. Woods

== Graduating Cadet Class – CL-43-1 – Liaison Pilot – September 30, 1943 ==
- 2nd Lt Darryl C. Bishop
- 2nd Lt Harry W. Dungill
- 2nd Lt Charles Dunn
- 1st Lt Chauncey Eskridge
- 2nd Lt Arnold D. Grant
- 2nd Lt Leander A. Hall Jr.
- 1st Lt James I. Minor, Jr.
- 2nd Lt Benjamin F. Moore
- 1st Lt William Y. Rose
- Capt. William H. Shannon
- 2nd Lt Lloyd R. V. Taylor
- 2nd Lt Leonard E. Wilburn
- 2nd Lt Adlrick H. Wilson
- 2nd Lt James E. Woodson

== Graduating Cadet Class – Single Engine Section – SE-43-I – October 1, 1943 ==
- 2nd Lt William N. Alsbrook
- 2nd Lt Cecil L. Browder
- 2nd Lt Gene C. Browne
- Flight Officer William Cross, Jr.
- 2nd Lt Purnell J. Goodenough
- 2nd Lt George Haley
- 2nd Lt Maceo A. Harris Jr. †, declared dead after air crash in Germany on November 20, 1944.
- 2nd Lt Carl E Johnson, Not to be confused with Tuskegee Airman Flight Officer Carl C. Johnson of Cadet Class 46-C – October 1946
- 2nd Lt Charles B. Johnson, declared dead after air crash in Mediterranean Sea on June 24, 1944.
- 2nd Lt Edgar L. Jones, declared dead after air crash in Italy on April 24, 1944.
- 2nd Lt Carroll N. Langston †, killed after crashing into sea in Italy on June 7, 1944.
- 2nd Lt Cornelius F. May
- 2nd Lt Woodrow F. Morgan
- 2nd Lt Neal V. Nelson, presumed dead when aircraft encountered flak in Italy on May 11, 1944.
- 2nd Lt Christopher W. Newman
- 2nd Lt Driskell B. Ponder
- 2nd Lt George M. Rhodes, Jr.
- 2nd Lt Washington D. Ross
- 2nd Lt Norman W. Scales
- 2nd Lt Henry B. Scott
- 2nd Lt Alphonso Simmons †, killed by anti-aircraft fire on March 3, 1945, in Austria after shooting two parked German planes.
- 2nd Lt Robert H. Smith
- 2nd Lt Edward W. Watkins

== Graduating Cadet Class – Liaison Pilot Section – CL-43-2 – October 22, 1943 ==
- 2nd Lt Henry Bennet,
- 2nd Lt George F. Bizzell
- 1st Lt Terry H. Brooks
- 2nd Lt Richard C. Chatman Jr.
- 2nd Lt William J. Cleveland
- 2nd Lt John O. Cunningham
- 1st Lt John B. Dudley
- 1st Lt Gaines C. Farley
- 2nd Lt John M. Franklin
- 2nd Lt Louis K. Hanks
- 1st Lt Fred E. Howard
- 2nd Lt William M. Jordan
- 2nd Lt Thurston Mason
- 2nd Lt John E. McCode
- 1st Lt. Leroy Stephens Jr.
- 2nd Lt Daniel C. Thomas
- 2nd Lt Paul Weathersby
- 1st Lt Robert L. Wrenn

== Graduating Cadet Class – Single Engine Section – SE-43-J – November 3, 1943 ==
- Brown, 2nd Lt James B
- 2nd Lt Roger B. Brown, killed June 14, 1944; P-47 crashed during a training mission
- 2nd Lt Herman A. Campbell
- 2nd Lt Clarence Dart (WIA), listed as Clarence W. Dart
- Carroll, 2nd Lt Alfred Q., Jr.
- 2nd Lt Charles W. Dickerson
- 2nd Lt Henry F. Fletcher
- 2nd Lt Perry E. Hudson Jr.
- 2nd Lt Oscar D. Hutton
- 2nd Lt Haldane King
- 2nd Lt Edward Laird
- Leftwich, 2nd Lt Ivey L.
- 2nd Lt Vincent J. Mason
- 2nd Lt Theodore H Mills
- 2nd Lt Turner W. Payne
- 2nd Lt Gwynne W. Peirson
- 2nd Lt Harvey N. Pinkney
- Flight Officer Nathaniel P. Rayburg
- 2nd Lt Emory L. Robbins Jr.
- Sherard, 2nd Lt Earl S., Jr.
- 2nd Lt Paul J. Simmons Jr.
- 2nd Lt Eugene Smith, listed as Eugene D. Smith
- 2nd Lt Jerome D. Spurlin
- 2nd Lt Nathaniel C. Stewart
- 2nd Lt Edward H. Thomas
- 2nd Lt William M. Thomas
- 2nd Lt William D. Tompkins
- 2nd Lt Hugh St. Clair Warner
- 2nd Lt Leslie A Williams

== Graduating Cadet Class – Single Engine Section – SE-43-K – December 3, 1943 ==
- 2nd Lt Edgar L. Bolden
- 2nd Lt Clarence H. Bradford
- 2nd Lt Robert H. Daniels, Jr.
- 2nd Lt Othell Dickson
- 2nd Lt Robert Friend, listed as Robert J. Friend
- 2nd Lt Fredrick D. Funderburg
- 2nd Lt Howard C. Gamble
- 2nd Lt Stanley L Harris
- 2nd Lt Lloyd S. Hatchcock
- Flight Officer William Lee Hill, listed as William L. Hill, shot down twice and credited with one aerial victory
- 2nd Lt Lloyd S. Hatchcock
- 2nd Lt Wellington G. Irving
- 2nd Lt Clarence D. Lester
- 2nd Lt William R. Lewis
- 2nd Lt Henry Pollard
- 2nd Lt Reid E. Thompson
- Flight Officer Edward J. Williams

== Graduating Cadet Class – Twin Engine Section – TE-43-K – December 3, 1943 ==
- 2nd Lt Samuel A. Black Jr.
- 2nd Lt Harold E. Brazil
- 2nd Lt William L. Byrd Jr.
- 2nd Lt Eugene Calvin Cheatham Jr., listed as "Eugene C. Cheatham Jr."
- 2nd Lt Stewart B. Fullbright Jr.
- 2nd Lt John L. Harrison Jr
- 2nd Lt Henry P. Hervey Jr.
- 2nd Lt Richard B. Highbaugh
- 2nd Lt Harold A. Hillard
- 1st Lt. Elmore V. Kennedy
- 2nd Lt Samuel L. Lynn
- 1st Lt. Fitzroy Newsum
- Flight Officer Amos A. Rogers
- 2nd Lt Wendell D. Wells
- 2nd Lt Joseph D. Whiten

== Graduating Cadet Class – CL-43-3 – Liaison Pilot Section – December 7, 1943 ==
- 1st Lt Lee Arthur Baker
- 2nd Lt. John D. Battle
- 2nd Lt. Edward W. Brice
- 2nd Lt. Johnny Y. Brooks
- 1st Lt Scott K. Cleage
- 2nd Lt. George D. Conquest
- 2nd Lt. Charles B. Elam
- 2nd Lt. Ernest W. Goldsborough
- 2nd Lt. Maxwell Honemond
- 2nd Lt. Sterling K. Jackson
- 2nd Lt. William H. Johnson
- 2nd Lt. Wendell W. Long
- 2nd Lt. Henry A. Norman
- 2nd Lt. Horace W. Oates
- 2nd Lt. Elwood A Smith
- 2nd Lt. Sherman W. Smith
- 2nd Lt. Lemuel L. Tucker
- 2nd Lt. George Woods

== Graduating Cadet Class – Single Engine Section – SE-44-A – January 7, 1944 ==
- Flight Officer Clarence N. Driver (MIA), Missing in Action in Laos on 7 March 1973.
- 2nd Lt Charles H. Duke
- 2nd Lt Charles S. Jackson, Jr.
- 2nd Lt Alexander Jefferson
- 2nd Lt Robert Martin, listed as Robert L. Martin
- 2nd Lt Frederick D. McIver, Jr.
- 2nd Lt Robert O'Neil
- 2nd Lt Sanford M. Perkins
- 2nd Lt Frank E. Roberts
- 2nd Lt Arthur J. Wilburn

== Graduating Cadet Class -Twin Engine Section TE-44-A – January 7, 1944 ==
- 2nd Lt Elliot H. Blue
- 2nd Lt Rolin A. Bynum
- Flight Officer Virgil A. Daniels
- 2nd Lt Samuel L. Harper
- 2nd Lt Kenneth R. Hawkins
- 2nd Lt Charles H. Hunter
- 2nd Lt Andrea P. Masciana
- 2nd Lt Frederick L. Parker, Jr.
- 2nd Lt William A. Rucker
- 2nd Lt Leon L. Turner
- Flight Officer Saint M. Twine, Jr.
- 2nd Lt Charles Walker
- Flight Officer Clarence Walker
- 2nd Lt Herbert W. Williams
- 2nd Lt Eugene Winslow

== Graduating Cadet Class – Single Engine Section – SE-44-K – February 1, 1945 ==
- 2nd Lt Montro D Askins
- 2nd Lt Lloyd W Bell
- Flight Officer Richard L. Biffle, Jr.
- 2nd Lt James E. Bowman
- 2nd Lt Lawrence A. Brown
- 2nd Lt Lloyd A.N. Carter
- 2nd Lt Lowell H. Cleaver
- 2nd Lt William A. Colbert, Jr.
- 2nd Lt Charles E. Craig
- 2nd Lt Joshua Glenn
- 2nd Lt Percy Heath, listed as Percy L Heath Jr.
- 2nd Lt William T. Henry
- 2nd Lt William H. Hymes
- 2nd Lt Beecher A. Jones
- 2nd Lt Robert O. Merriweather
- 2nd Lt Ephraim E. Toatley Jr.

== Graduating Cadet Class – Twin Engine Section – TE-44-K -February 1, 1945 ==
- 2nd Lt Rayfield A. Anderson
- Flight Officer Grover Crunnbsy
- Flight Officer Oliver Goodall, listed as Ollie O. Goodall Jr.
- 2nd Lt Archie H.Harris, Jr.
- 2nd Lt Mitchell Higginbotham, listed as Mitchell L. Higginbotham
- 2nd Lt Roger Terry, listed as Roger C. Terry
- Flight Officer Haydel J. White

== Graduating Cadet Class – Single Engine Section – SE-44-C – February 8, 1944 ==
- Ludovic F. Audant, Haitian Cadet
- 2nd Lt Thomas P. Braswell
- 2nd Lt Robert C. Chandler
- 2nd Lt Emile G. Clifton
- 2nd Lt Roger B. Gaiter
- 2nd Lt Thomas L. Gay
- 2nd Lt Joseph E. Gordon
- 2nd Lt Alfred Gorham, listed as Alfred M. Gorham (POW)
- Flight Officer Cornelius P. Gould Jr.
- 2nd Lt Richard S. Harder
- 2nd Lt Wilbur F. Long
- 2nd Lt Richard D. Macon
- 2nd Lt Frank H. Moody, killed April 11, 1944 on a training mission over Lake Huron in Michigan; plane found 70 years later.
- 2nd Lt Thomas G. Patton
- 2nd Lt Marion Rodgers, listed as Marion R. Rodgers
- 2nd Lt Shelby F. Westbrook
- 2nd Lt Cohen M. White
- Flight Officer Leonard R. Willette
- 2nd Lt Kenneth I. Williams
- 2nd Lt Henry Wise Jr., listed as Henry A. Wise

== Graduating Cadet Class – Twin Engine Section – TE-44-C -February 8, 1944 ==
- 2nd Lt Winston A. Adkins
- 2nd Lt Charles W. Diggs
- 2nd Lt William H. Farley
- 2nd Lt. Frederick P. Hicks
- 2nd Lt Charles D. Hill
- 1st Lt. Louis G. Hill, Jr.
- 2nd Lt George B. Matthews
- Pellissier C. Nicholas (Haitian Cadet)

== Graduating Cadet Class – Single Engine Section – SE-44-C – March 12, 1944 ==
- 2nd Lt Fred L. Brewer, Jr. †, declared dead after P-51C Mustang “Traveling Light” experienced engine trouble, went down October 20, 1944 over Germany.
- 2nd Lt Roscoe Brown, listed as Roscoe C. Brown
- 2nd Lt Walter R. Brown Jr.
- 2nd Lt James A. Calhoun
- 2nd Lt Vincent C. Dean
- 2nd Lt James L. Hall Jr.
- 2nd Lt Herbet H. Heywood
- 2nd Lt Elbert Hudson
- 2nd Lt Andrew D Marshall
- 2nd Lt Rixie H. McCarroll
- 2nd Lt Joseph L. Merton, Jr.
- 2nd Lt Elton H. Nightingale
- 2nd Lt John H. Porter
- 2nd Lt William S. Price, III
- 2nd Lt Gordon M. Rapier
- 2nd Lt Henry E. Rohlsen
- 2nd Lt Roosevelt Stiger
- 2nd Lt William M. Wheeler
- 2nd Lt Charles L. White
- 2nd Lt Albert L. Young

== Graduating Cadet Class – Twin Engine Section – TE-44-C – March 12, 1944 ==
- 2nd Lt Charles E. Darnell
- 2nd Lt Reginald W. Hayes
- 1st Lt Payton H. Lyle
- 2nd Lt Ahmed A. Rayner, Jr.
- Flight Officer Charles E. Wilson

== Graduating Cadet Class – Single Engine Section – SE-44-D – April 15, 1944 ==
- 2nd Lt Barnes, Gentry E.
- Flight Officer Bell, Raul W.
- 2nd Lt Chavis, John H.
- 2nd Lt Cox, Hannibal M.
- 2nd Lt Craig, Lewis W.
- 2nd Lt Hays, Milton S.
- Flight Officer Jackson, Charles L.
- 2nd Lt Jones, Major E.
- 2nd Lt Lane, Earl R.
- 2nd Lt Walter Manning, listed as Walter P. Manning
- Flight Officer Mitchell, Vincent I.
- 2nd Lt Moody, Roland W.
- 2nd Lt Morris, Harold M.
- 2nd Lt Peoples, Francis B.
- 2nd Lt Peoples, Henry R..
- 2nd Lt Rich, Daniel L.
- 2nd Lt Turner, Ralph L.
- 2nd Lt Wheeler, Jimmie D.
- Flight Officer Williams, Vincent E.
- 2nd Lt Wilson, James A.
- Flight Officer Wilson, Myron
- Flight Officer Woods, Carl J.

== Graduating Cadet Class – Twin Engine Section – TE-44-D – April 15, 1944 ==
- 2nd Lt Alexander, Harvey R.
- 2nd Lt Anderson, Robert D.
- 2nd Lt Brashears, Virgil
- 2nd Lt Coleman, William C.
- Flight Officer Cook, Martin L.
- 2nd Lt Cousins, August, Jr.
- Eberle J. Guilbaud
- 2nd Lt King, Celestus
- 2nd Lt Kydd, George H., III
- 2nd Lt Moody, Paul L.
- 2nd Lt Shults, Lloyd R.

== Graduating Cadet Class – Single Engine Section – SE-44-E – May 23, 1944 ==
- 2nd Lt. Richard H. Bell
- 2nd Lt. Leonelle A. Bonam
- Flight Officer Charles V. Brantley
- 2nd Lt. H. Brown, (POW) listed as Harold E. Brown
- 2nd Lt. Joseph E. Chineworth
- 2nd Lt. George E. Cisco
- 2nd Lt. Harry J. Davenport Jr.
- 2nd Lt. John W. Davis
- Flight Officer Samuel J. Foreman
- Flight Officer Thomas L. Hawkins
- 2nd Lt. George K. Hays
- 2nd Lt. Maycie Herrington, listed as Arron Herrington
- 2nd Lt. Earl B. Highbaugh
- 2nd Lt. Wendell W. Hockaday
- 2nd Lt. George J. Iles
- Flight Officer Thomas W. Jefferson
- 2nd Lt. Jimmy Lanham
- 1st Lt. Wendell M. Lucas
- 2nd Lt. Clarence A. Oliphant
- 2nd Lt. Ralph Orduna
- Flight Officer Robert A. Pillow
- Flight Officer James C. Ramsey
- 2nd Lt. Leroy Roberts Jr.
- Flight Officer Arnett W. Starks Jr.
- 2nd Lt. William C. Walker Jr
- 2nd Lt. Samuel W. Watts Jr.
- 2nd Lt. Robert W. Williams
- 2nd Lt. Bertram W. Wilson Jr.
- Flight Officer Hiram Wright
- 2nd Lt. Kenneth M. Wright

== Graduating Cadet Class – Single Engine Section – SE-44-F – June 27, 1944 ==
- Flight Officer Richard S. A. Armistead
- 2nd Lt Carl F. Ellis
- 2nd Lt Charles A. Hill Jr.
- 2nd Lt Lincoln Hudson, listed as Lincoln T. Hudson
- 2nd Lt Rupert C. Johnson
- 2nd Lt Lawrence, Robert W.
- 2nd Lt James W. Wright Jr.
- Flight Officer George A. Lynch
- 2nd Lt Lewis J. Lynch
- 2nd Lt Hiram Mann, listed as Hiram E. Mann
- Flight Officer James T. Mitchell Jr.
- Flight Officer Robert J. Murdic
- Flight Officer Wyrain T. Schell
- Flight Officer Leon W. Spears
- 2nd Lt Harry Stewart, Jr., listed as Harry T. Stewart Jr.
- Flight Officer Samuel L. Washington
- 2nd Lt Hugh J. White
- Flight Officer Yenwith K. Whitney
- 2nd Lt Frank N. Wright
- 2nd Lt James W. Wright Jr.

== Graduating Cadet Class -Twin Engine Section -TE-44-F – June 27, 1944 ==
- Flight Officer James Ewing
- Flight Officer William T Jackson
- 2nd Lt Laurel E. Keith
- 2nd Lt Frank Lee
- Flight Officer John R. Perkins Jr.
- 2nd Lt John B. Turner
- 2nd Lt Rhohelia J. Webb

== Graduating Cadet Class – Single Engine Section – SE-44-G – August 4, 1944 ==
- 2nd Lt. George L. Bing
- Flight Officer John Ellis Edwards, listed as John E. Edwards
- Flight Officer William H. Edwards
- Fischer, Flight Officer James H.
- Flight Officer Thurston L. Gaines, Jr.
- 2nd Lt. Robert E. Garrison, Jr.
- 2nd Lt. Flight Officer Newman C. Golden
- 2nd Lt. Leo R. Gray
- 2nd Lt. Paul L. Green
- 2nd Lt. Conrad A. Johnson, Jr.
- 2nd Lt. Benny R. Kimbrough
- Flight Officer John Lyle, (listed as John H. Lyle)
- Flight Officer Elbert N. Merriweather, Jr
- Flight Officer Leland H. Pennington
- 2nd Lt. Ronald W. Reeves
- Flight Officer Maury M. Reid
- Flight Officer William E. Rice
- 2nd Lt. Robert C. Robinson, Jr.
- Flight Officer Calvin J. Spann
- 2nd Lt. Thomas C. Street
- 2nd Lt. Harry L. White
- Flight Officer Joseph C. White
- Flight Officer Robert E. Williams, Jr.

== Graduating Cadet Class – Twin Engine Section – TE-44-G – August 4, 1944 ==
- Flight Officer James E. Brothers
- 2nd Lt. Harold Howard Brown
- 2nd Lt. Reginald Bruce
- 1st Lt. Claude C. Davis
- 2nd Lt. Edward T. Dixon
- Flight Officer Edward Harris
- Flight Officer Willard B. Miller
- 2nd Lt. John Mosley, listed as John William Mosley
- Flight Officer Ramon F. Noches
- Flight Officer Maurice D. Pompey
- Flight Officer Charles J. Quander Jr.
- Flight Officer Harris H. Robnett, Jr.
- Flight Officer James H. Sheppard
- Flight Officer Jesse H. Simpson

== Graduating Cadet Class – Single Engine Section – SE-44-H – September 8, 1944 ==
- Anders, 2nd Lt. Emet R.
- Flight Officer William Armstrong †
- Barland, 2nd Lt. Herbert C.
- Carey, 2nd Lt. Carl E.
- Coleman, 2nd Lt. James
- Cooper, Flight Officer Charles W.
- Cousins, 2nd Lt. William M.
- Franklin, 2nd Lt. George E.
- Gant, Flight Officer Morris E.
- 2nd Lt. George Hardy, listed as George E. Hardy
- 2nd Lt. William H. Holloman
- Jenkins, 2nd Lt. Stephen S., Jr.
- Johnson, Flight Officer Robert M.
- Flight Officer Charles A. Lane
- 2nd Lt. Samuel G. Leftenant,
- Lieteau, 1st Lt Albert J.
- Manley, Flight Officer Edward E.
- Matthews, Flight Officer Samuel
- McCrory, 2nd Lt. Felix M.
- Miller, Flight Officer Lawrence I.
- Squires, Flight Officer John W.
- Washington, Flight Officer Milton S.
- 2nd Lt. John L. Whitehead Jr.

== Graduating Cadet Class – Twin Engine Section – TE-44-H – September 8, 1944 ==
- Bonseigneur, 2nd Lt. Paul J., Jr.
- Brown, 2nd Lt. Augustus G.
- Brown, 2nd Lt. Robert S.
- Goodwin, 1st Lt Luther A.
- Henry, Warren E.
- Hurd, 1st Lt James A.
- Nalle, Flight Officer Russell C., Jr.
- Rector, 1st Lt John A.
- Samuels, Flight Officer Frederick H.

== Graduating Cadet Class – Single Engine Section – SE-44-I-1 – October 16, 1944 ==
- 2nd Lt. Rutherford H. Adkins
- Daniels, Flight Officer Thomas J., III
- Doram, 2nd Lt. Edward D.
- Dowling, 2nd Lt. Corneilus D.
- Glass, Flight Officer Robert M.
- 2nd Lt. James H. Harvey
- Hunter, 2nd Lt. Henry A.
- Jackson, Flight Officer Frank A.
- Lancaster, 2nd Lt. Theadore W.
- Miller, 2nd Lt. Charles E.
- Millett, 2nd Lt. Joseph H.
- Myers, 2nd Lt. Charles P.
- Simons, 2nd Lt. Richard A.
- Stevens, 2nd Lt. Richard G.
- Stovall, 2nd Lt. Charles L
- Thompson, 2nd Lt. Donald N., Jr.
- Thorpe, 2nd Lt. Richard E.
- Turner, 2nd Lt. Allen H.
- Warren, Flight Officer James W.
- White, 2nd Lt. Ferrier H

== Graduating Cadet Class – Twin Engine Section – TE-44-I-1 – October 16, 1944 ==
- Anderson, 1st Lt Paul T.
- Brown, 2nd Lt. James W.
- Cain, Flight Officer William L.
- Chinchester, 2nd Lt. James R.
- Collins, Flight Officer Gamaliel M.
- Drummond, 2nd Lt. Charles H., Jr.
- Exum, Flight Officer Herven P.
- Green, Flight Officer James L.
- Jenkins, 2nd Lt. Joseph E.
- Jenkins, 2nd Lt. Silas M.
- Mason, 2nd Lt. Theodore O.
- Maxwell, Flight Officer Charles C.
- Murphy, Flight Officer David J.
- Pullian, Flight Officer Glen W.
- Smith, 1st Lt Harold E.

== Graduating Cadet Class – Single Engine Section – SE-44-I – November 20, 1944 ==
- 2nd Lt Halbert L. Alexander
- 2nd Lt William R. Alston
- Flight Officer John J. Bell
- 2nd Lt Irvin O. Brewin
- Flight Officer Julius W. Calloway
- Flight Officer Tamenund J. Dickerson Jr.
- 2nd Lt Thomas Gladden
- Flight Officer Vernon Hopson
- 2nd Lt Garfield L. Jenkins
- 2nd Lt Alvin J. Johnson
- 2nd Lt Andrew Johnson Jr.
- 2nd Lt Louis W. Johnson
- 2nd Lt Willis E. Moore
- Flight Officer Calvin G. Moret
- 2nd Lt Lincoln W. Nelson
- 2nd Lt Eugene G. Theodore
- Flight Officer Leonard O. Vaughan
- Flight Officer Reginald C. Waddell
- 2nd Lt William M. Washington
- 2nd Lt Ralph D. Wilkins

== Graduating Cadet Class – Twin Engine Section – TE-44-I – November 20, 1944 ==
- Fears, Flight Officer Henry T.
- 2nd Lt Bernard R. Harris
- Hawkins, Flight Officer Donald A.
- 2nd Lt Eugene R. Henderson
- 2nd Lt Voris S. James
- Flight Officer Charles A. Johnson
- McQuillan, Flight Officer Douglas H.
- Flight Officer Robert M. Parkey
- 2nd Lt James V. Stevenson
- Flight Officer Wayman P. Surcey
- Flight Officer Morris J. Washington
- Flight Officer Raymond M. White
- 2nd Lt James W. Whyte Jr.
- 2nd Lt Joseph H. Williams
- 2nd Lt Oscar H. York

== Graduating Cadet Class – Single Engine Section – SE-44-J – December 28, 1944 ==
- Bohannon, Flight Officer Horace A.
- Flight Officer Henry Cabot Lodge Bohler
- Bryant, Flight Officer Leroy, Jr.
- Burns, 2nd Lt. Isham A., Jr.
- Campbell, Flight Officer Lindsey L.
- Campbell, 2nd Lt. McWheeler
- Cole, Flight Officer Robert A.
- Dickson, Flight Officer DeWitt
- Greer, Flight Officer James W.
- Guyton, Flight Officer Eugene L.
- Harris, 2nd Lt. James E.
- Kirksey, Flight Officer LeeRoy
- Nelson, Flight Officer Dempsey, Jr.
- Parker, Flight Officer Melvin
- Pendleton, 2nd Lt. Frederick
- Shivers, Flight Officer Clarence L.
- Smith, Flight Officer Thomas W.
- Stephenson, Flight Officer William W., Jr.
- 1st Lt Yancey Williams
- Williamson, Flight Officer Willie A.

== Graduating Cadet Class – Twin Engine Section – TE-44-J – December 28, 1944 ==
- Allen, Flight Officer Walter H.
- Cowan, Flight Officer Edwin T.
- Edwards, Flight Officer James E., Jr.
- Flake, Flight Officer Thomas M.
- Herron, 1st Lt Walter E.
- Hunter, 2nd Lt. Samuel D.
- McRae, 2nd Lt. Ivan J., Jr.
- Moore, Flight Officer Flarzell
- Flight Officer John Ira Mulzac
- Qualles, Flight Officer John P.
- 2nd Lt. Lawrence E. Roberts
- Velasquez, Flight Officer Frederick B.
- Williams, Flight Officer William L., Jr.
- Wooten, Flight Officer Howard A.
- Wynn, Flight Officer Nasby, Jr.

== Graduating Cadet Class – Single Engine Section – SE-45-A – March 11, 1945 ==
- Flight Officer Luzine B. Bickham
- Flight Officer Broadnax, Samuel L.
- 2nd Lt John Albert Burch III
- 2nd Lt Emest M. Cabule Jr.
- 2nd Lt Vincent O. Campbell
- 2nd Lt William J. Coleman
- Flight Officer Edgar A. Doswell Jr.
- 2nd Lt Clarence C. Finley
- 2nd Lt Joseph E. Gash
- 2nd Lt Bertrand J. Holbert
- 2nd Lt Edward M. Jenkins
- Flight Officer Robert Jones Jr.
- Flight Officer Wilbur Moffett
- 2nd Lt Thomas J. Morrison Jr.
- Flight Officer Harry S. Pruitt
- 2nd Lt Marsille P. Reed
- 2nd Lt Clayo C. Rice
- 2nd Lt Eugene J. Richardson Jr.
- 2nd Lt Spencer M. Robinson
- 2nd Lt Albert H. Smith
- 2nd Lt John B. Walker Jr.
- Flight Officer Harry P. Winston

== Graduating Cadet Class – Twin Engine Section – TE-45-A – March 11, 1945 ==
- 2nd Lt Melvin A. Clayton
- 2nd Lt Hemdon M. Cummings
- Flight Officer William J. Curtis Jr.
- 2nd Lt Charles J. Dorkins
- Flight Officer Rutledge H. Fleming Jr.
- Flight Officer Charles S. Goldsby
- 2nd Lt Argonne F. Harden
- 2nd Lt James V. Kennedy Jr.
- Flight Officer Harvey L. McClelland
- Flight Officer Alfred U. McKenzie
- 2nd Lt Luther L. Oliver
- 2nd Lt Herbert J. Schwing
- 2nd Lt Quentin P. Smith
- 2nd Lt Francis R Thompson
- 2nd Lt Cleophus W. Valentine
- 2nd Lt Calvin T. Warrick

== Graduating Cadet Class – Single Engine Section – SE-45-B – April 15, 1945 ==
- 2nd Lt. John H. Adams Jr.
- 2nd Lt. Clarence Bee, Jr
- Brooks, Flight Officer Tilford U.
- Casey, Flight Officer Clifton G.
- Curtis, 2nd Lt. John W.
- Dudley, 2nd Lt. Richard
- Gilliam, Flight Officer William L.
- Henson, 2nd Lt. James W.
- Hughes, Flight Officer Samuel R., Jr.
- Knight, Flight Officer William H.
- Long, Flight Officer Clyde C., Jr.
- Patton, Flight Officer Humprey C., Jr
- Payne, Flight Officer Verdelle L.
- Pennington, Flight Officer Robert F.
- Porter, Flight Officer Robert B.
- Powell, Flight Officer William S., Jr.
- Purnell, Flight Officer George B.
- Radcliffe, 2nd Lt. Lloyd L.
- Sheats, 2nd Lt. George H.
- Smith, 2nd Lt. Burl E.
- Tucker, Flight Officer Paul
- Winslow, 2nd Lt. Robert W.
- Winston, Flight Officer Charles H., Jr.

== Graduating Cadet Class – Twin Engine Section – TE-45-B – April 15, 1945 ==
- Flight Officer Leroy Criss
- Desvignes, Flight Officer Russell F.
- Freeman, Flight Officer Eldridge E.
- Johnson, 2nd Lt. Theopolis W.
- Jordon, 2nd Lt. Lowell H.
- Norton, Flight Officer George G., Jr.
- Taylor, Flight Officer James E.

== Graduating Cadet Class – Single Engine Section – SE-45-C – May 23, 1945 ==
- Bailey, Flight Officer Terry C.
- Clayter, 2nd Lt. Ralph V.
- Franklin, 2nd Lt. Earl N.
- Helem, 2nd Lt. George W.
- Hicks, 2nd Lt. Arthur N.
- Holman, Flight Officer William D.
- Johnson, Flight Officer Earl C.
- Jones, Flight Officer Frank D
- McKnight, 2nd Lt. James W.
- Murray, 2nd Lt. Louis U.
- Parker, 2nd Lt. George J.
- Perkins, 2nd Lt. Roscoe C., Jr.
- Sanderlin, 2nd Lt. Willis E.
- Session, 2nd Lt. Mansfield L.
- Tindall, Flight Officer Thomas J.
- Wanamaker, Flight Officer George E.
- White, Flight Officer Harry W.
- Wofford, 2nd Lt. Kenneth O.
- Young, 2nd Lt. Benjamin, Jr.

== Graduating Cadet Class – Twin Engine Section – TE-45-C – May 23, 1945 ==
- Smith, 2nd Lt Frederick D.
- Tyler, 2nd Lt William A., Jr.

== Graduating Cadet Class – Single Engine Section – June 4, 1945 ==
- Stewart Field, New York
  - 2nd Lt Earnest J. Davis Jr.

== Graduating Cadet Class – Single Engine Section – SE-45-D – June 27, 1945 ==
- 2nd Lt. Walter G. Alexander, III
- Bilbo, Flight Officer Reuben B.
- Blaylock, 2nd Lt. Joseph E.
- Bryant, 2nd Lt. Grady E.
- Bryson, Flight Officer James O.
- Carter, Flight Officer Clarence J.
- Cobbs, 2nd Lt. Wilson N.
- Connell, 2nd Lt. Victor L.
- Corbin, Flight Officer Matthew J.
- Francis, Flight Officer William V.
- Giles, Flight Officer Ivie V.
- Hall, 2nd Lt. Leonard C., Jr.
- Harrison, 2nd Lt. James E.
- Johnson, 2nd Lt. Clarence
- Johnston, Flight Officer William A., Jr.
- Kelly, Flight Officer Thomas A.
- Knight, Flight Officer Calvin M.
- Prather, 2nd Lt. George L.
- Prince, 2nd Lt. Joseph A.
- Raymond, Flight Officer Frank R.
- Robinson, 2nd Lt. Robert L., Jr.
- Simeon, Flight Officer Albert B., Jr.
- Smith, Flight Officer Robert C.
- Thomas, Flight Officer Walter H., Jr.
- Trott, 2nd Lt. Robert G.
- Wilhite, 2nd Lt. Emmett J.
- Williams, Flight Officer Raymond L.
- Yates, Flight Officer Phillip C.
- Young, Flight Officer Lee W.

== Graduating Cadet Class – Single Engine Section – SE-45-E – August 4, 1945 ==
- Bailey, 2nd Lt William H.
- Barnett, Flight Officer Herman A.
- Collins, Flight Officer Russell L.
- Duncan, 2nd Lt Roger B.
- Flight Officer William A. Fuller Jr. (not to be confused with Willie H. Fuller (listed as Willie Fuller) of Single Engine Section Cadet Class SE-42-G, August 5, 1942
- Gaskins, 2nd Lt Aaron C.
- Holland, Henry T.
- Hurt, 2nd Lt Wesley D.
- McIntyre, 2nd Lt Clinton E.
- Reynolds, Flight Officer Clarence E., Jr.
- Roberts, Flight Officer Logan
- Saunders, 2nd Lt Martin G.
- Scott, 2nd Lt Joseph P.
- Flight Officer Reginald V. Smith
- Turner, 2nd Lt. Gordon G.
- White, Flight Officer Marvin C., Sr.
- Wiggins, Flight Officer Leonard W.
- Williams, 2nd Lt Eugene W.
- Woods, Flight Officer Isaac R.

== Graduating Cadet Class – Twin Engine Section – TE-45-E – August 4, 1945 ==
- Broadwater, Flight Officer William E.
- 2nd Lt. George L. Brown, listed as George A. Brown Jr.
- Bryant, Flight Officer Joseph C., Jr.
- Choisy, 2nd Lt. George B.
- Curry, 2nd Lt. John C.
- Ford, Flight Officer Harry E., Jr.
- Griffin, Jerrold D.
- Harris, 2nd Lt. John S.
- Maples, Flight Officer Harold B.
- Flight Officer George R. Miller
- Mosley, Flight Officer Clifford E.
- O'Neal, Flight Officer Walter N.
- Prewitt, Flight Officer Mexion O.
- Proctor, Flight Officer Oliver W.
- Roach, Flight Officer John B.
- Taylor, Flight Officer William H., Jr.
- Toney, Flight Officer Mitchel N
- Whiteside, Flight Officer Albert

== Graduating Cadet Class – Single Engine Section – SE-45-F – September 8, 1945 ==
- 2nd Lt Reuben H. Brown, Jr.
- 2nd Lt Walter P. Curry
- 2nd Lt Donald F. Davis
- 2nd Lt Sylvester S. Davis
- Flight Officer Elliott H. Gray
- 2nd Lt Bennett G. Hardy
- 2nd Lt Thomas D. Harris, Jr.
- 2nd Lt Earl Kelly
- 2nd Lt August J. Martin
- 2nd Lt Ralph W. Mason
- 2nd Lt Herbert A. McIntyre
- 2nd Lt William B. Morgan
- 2nd Lt Augustus L. Palmer
- Flight Officer Floyd R. Scott Jr.
- Flight Officer Edward W. Watkins
- 2nd Lt Julius C. Westmoreland
- Flight Officer James L. Williams
- 2nd Lt Thomas E. Williams
- Flight Officer Sandy W. Wright
- 2nd Lt William W. Young

== Graduating Cadet Class – Twin Engine Section – TE-45-F – September 8, 1945 ==
- Bolden, 2nd Lt George C.
- Cheek, 2nd Lt Quentin V.
- Cooper, 2nd Lt Edward M.
- Dabney, 2nd Lt Roscoe J., Jr
- Davis, Flight Officer Clifford W.
- Finley, Flight Officer Otis E., Jr.
- Hancock, Flight Officer Victor
- Hodges, 2nd Lt Jerry T., Jr.
- Jamison, Flight Officer Donald S.
- Maxwell, 2nd Lt Robert L.
- Mozee, Flight Officer David M., Jr.
- Porter, 2nd Lt Calvin V.
- Ramsey, Flight Officer Pierce T.
- Roach, Flight Officer Charles J.
- Talton, Flight Officer James E.
- Terry, Flight Officer Kenneth E.
- White, 2nd Lt Vertner J., Jr.
- 2nd Lt Oscar Lawton Wilkerson, listed as Oscar L. Wilkerson, Jr.
- Wilson, 2nd Lt LeRoy J.

== Graduating Cadet Class – Single Engine Section – SE-45-G – October 16, 1945 ==
- Flight Officer Page L. Dickerson
- Flight Officer Alfred E. Garrett Jr.
- Flight Officer Alfonso L. Harris
- 2nd Lt Lorenzo W. Holloway Jr.
- Flight Officer Julien D. Jackson Jr.
- 2nd Lt William M. Jones
- Flight Officer George Sherman
- Flight Officer James A. Thompson

== Graduating Cadet Class – Twin Engine Section – TE-45-G – October 16, 1945 ==
- 2nd Lt Granville C. Coggs
- Flight Officer Julius P. Echols
- 2nd Lt Arthur C. Harmon
- Flight Officer Lonnie Harrison
- 2nd Lt Marcellus L. Hunter
- Flight Officer Daniel Keel
- 2nd Lt William Leslie
- 2nd Lt Perry W. Lindsey
- Flight Officer Charles R. Price
- Flight Officer James C. Russell
- 2nd Lt Herbert C. Thorpe
- Flight Officer Richard Weatherford
- 2nd Lt James R. Williams

== Graduating Cadet Class – Single Engine Section – SE-45-H – November 20, 1945 ==
- Flight Officer Sylvester H. Hurd Jr.
- Flight Officer Herbert Lewis Jr.
- 2nd Lt Godfrey C. Miller
- 2nd Lt Lincoln J. Ragsdale
- 2nd Lt Thurman E. Spriggs

== Graduating Cadet Class – Twin Engine Section – TE-45-H – November 20, 1945 ==
- 2nd Lt Robert Ashby
- Flight Officer Henry Baldwin Jr.
- 2nd Lt William V. Bibb
- 2nd Lt Lawrence W. Carroll
- 2nd Lt Jose R. Elfalan
- Flight Officer Nathaniel W. Goins
- Flight Officer Alvin E. Harrison Jr.
- Flight Officer Lyman L. Hubbard,
- Flight Officer Donald E. Jackson
- 2nd Lt Frederick D. Knight, Jr.
- 2nd Lt Joshua J. Lankford
- 2nd Lt Lloyd B. McKeethen
- Flight Officer John W. Nelson
- Flight Officer Norman E. Proctor
- 2nd Lt Nathaniel E. Robinson Jr.
- 2nd Lt Theodore W. Robinson
- Flight Officer Wayman E. Scott
- 2nd Lt Cecil Spicer
- Flight Officer William A. Streat Jr.
- Flight Officer Andrew B. Williams Jr.

== Graduating Cadet Class – Single Engine Section – SE-45-I – January 29, 1946 ==
- 2nd Lt Joseph Bruce Bennett
- Flight Officer Frank Griffin
- 2nd Lt Thomas Hamlin McGarrity
- 2nd Lt Merrill Ray Ross

== Graduating Cadet Class – Twin Engine Section – TE-45-I – January 29, 1946 ==
- 2nd Lt. James M. Dillon Jr.
- 2nd Lt Oliver M. Dillon
- 2nd Lt Everett Ellis
- Flight Officer Lee Archer Hayes
- Flight Officer Donehue Simmons

== Graduating Cadet Class – Single Engine Section – SE-46-A – March 23, 1946 ==
- Flight Officer James M. Barksdale
- Flight Officer Eugene A. Briggs
- 2nd Lt Jewel B. Butler
- 2nd Lt Charles W. Chambers
- 2nd Lt James H. Gallwey
- 2nd Lt Jacob W. Greenwell
- 2nd Lt Harry E. Lanauze
- 2nd Lt Thomas W. Love, Jr.

== Graduating Cadet Class – Twin Engine Section – TE-46-A – March 23, 1946 ==
- Flight Officer George A. Bates
- Flight Officer Floyd J. Carter
- 2nd Lt Charles R. Matthews
- Flight Officer Abe Benjamin Moore

== Graduating Cadet Class – Single Engine Section – April 29, 1946 ==
- 2nd Lt Andrew A. McCoy Jr.

== Graduating Cadet Class – Single Engine Section – SE-46-B – May 14, 1946 ==
- Flight Officer Maceo Conrad Martin Jr.
- Richard Maurice Moss
- Flight Officer Eddie Lee Young

== Graduating Cadet Class – Twin Engine Section – TE-46-B – May 14, 1946 ==
- 2nd Lt. Charles Aston Burns
- 2nd Lt Gene Derricotte, listed as Eugene Andrew Derricotte
- 2nd Lt. Ferdinand Albert Hardy
- Flight Officer Andrew James Hughes

== Graduating Cadet Class – Single Engine Section – SE-46-C – June 28, 1946 ==
- 2nd Lt. Carl V. Allen
- 2nd Lt. George E. Bell
- 2nd Lt. William G. Carter
- 2nd Lt. Conrad H. Cheek
- 2nd Lt. Jack Chin
- 2nd Lt. Edward P. Drummond
- 2nd Lt. Nicholas S. Neblett

== Graduating Cadet Class – Twin Engine Section – TE-46-C – June 28, 1946 ==
- 2nd Lt. James M. Allison
- 2nd Lt. Claude A. Rowe

== Graduating Cadet Class 46-C – Twin Engine Section – October 1946 ==
- Flight Officer Carl C. Johnson, not to be confused with Carl E. Johnson, Oct. 1, 1943 cadet graduate of Class 43-I-SE

== Graduating Cadet Class – Single Engine Section – SE-48-[unknown] – October 12, 1948 ==
- 2nd Lt. Lawrence E. "Larry" Campbell, Jr.

== Service Pilot Cadet Training – date not documented ==
- Flight Officer Robert A. Gordon
- Flight Officer Adolph J. Moret Jr.
- Flight Officer James O. Plinton Jr.
- Flight Officer Charles W. Stephens
- Flight Officer Robert Terry
- 2nd Lt Archie Williams
- Flight Officer Fred Witherspoon
- Flight Officer James E. Wright

== See also ==
- List of Tuskegee Airmen
- Executive Order 9981
- Military history of African Americans
