= Woodrow Crockett =

United States military officer and fighter pilot (1918–2012)

Woodrow W. "Woody" Crockett
- Born: Woodrow Wilson Crockett; August 31, 1918; Homan, Arkansas, U.S.
- Died: August 16, 2012 (aged 93); Washington, D.C., U.S.
- Resting place: Arlington National Cemetery, Section 59, Site 31, Arlington, Virginia
- Occupations: Military officer; fighter pilot
- Years active: 1940–1970

Woodrow Wilson Crockett (August 31, 1918 – August 16, 2012) (pronounced "Croc-et") was an officer in the U.S. Army Air Force/U.S. Air Force and a fighter pilot and interim commanding officer of the all-African American 332nd Fighter Group's 100th Fighter Squadron, best known as the Tuskegee Airmen or "Red Tails". He was one of the 1,007 documented Tuskegee Airmen Pilots.

Crockett is well known as one of the first U.S. military pilots selected to fly at Mach 2 speeds on June 2, 1959.

== Early life and family ==
Nicknamed "Woody" by his family, Crockett was born on August 31, 1918, in Homan, Arkansas, Miller County, Arkansas. Named after President Woodrow Wilson, Crockett was the fifth child of six children to William Crockett and Lucindan Crockett, both school teachers.

Crockett attended school in Homan until the eighth grade. After the eighth grade, Crockett moved to Little Rock, Arkansas to live with an older sister so that he could attend Arkansas' famed Dunbar High School, one of Arkansas' only high schools for African Americans. After graduating from Dumbar High School in 1939, Crockett attended Dunbar Junior College, majoring in mathematics towards an eventual PhD. In 1940, Crockett left Dunbar College, no longer unable to afford tuition on a dishwasher's salary working 12 hours per day.

Crockett was married to Daisy Juanita McMurray Crockett until her death in 2000. They had three daughters—Marcia Crockett, Rosemary Crockett, and Kathleen Crockett—and a son, Woodrow W. Crockett Jr.

== Military career ==
Crockett enlisted as a private in the U.S. Army's all-African American 349th Field Artillery Regiment, serving as an artilleryman with serial number 0-798943. After reading a pilot recruitment flyer, Crockett transferred to the Tuskegee's pilot cadet training program in August 1942. On March 25, 1943, Crockett graduated as a member of Cadet Class SE-43-C, receiving his wings and commission as a 2nd Lieutenant. Crockett was assigned to the 332nd Fighter Group's 100th Fighter Squadron. He was Arkansas' second citizen to graduate from Tuskegee's cadet program,

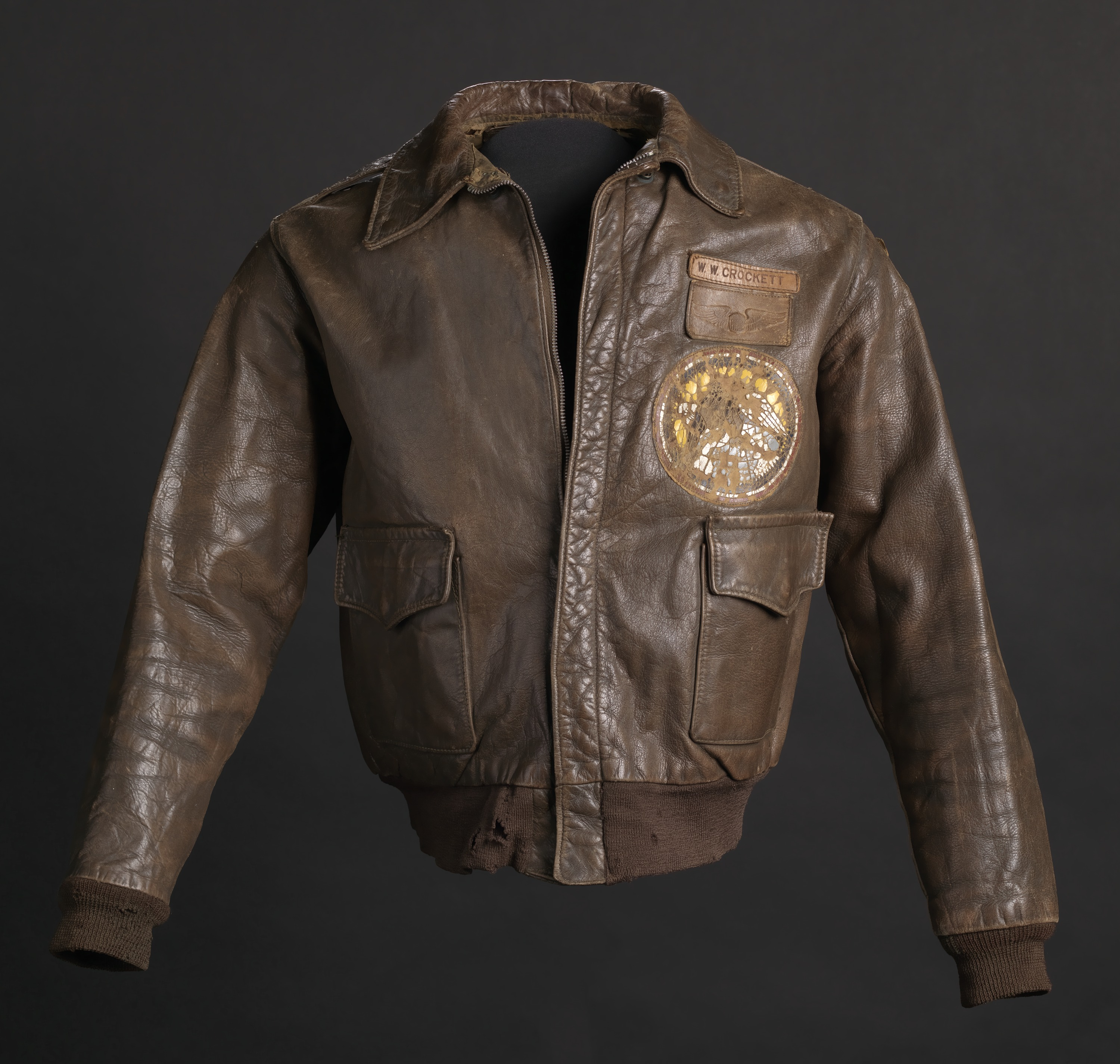
Crockett's Tuskegee Airmen Jacket

During World War II, Crockett flew 149 missions within a 15-month span. In June 1944 during a mission, Crockett contemporaneously assumed command of the 100th Squadron after squadron commander Lieutenant Robert B. Tresville and his plane crashed into the Mediterranean Sea; Tresville was later presumed missing in action and deceased. Fellow squadron pilot Andrew D. Turner would assume permanent command of the 100th Fighter Squadron.

Crockett flew 45 missions in the Korean war. Crockett was a member of the Twenty-fifth Air Division, and served at various U.S. Air Force bases. He served in many roles, including as a radiological safety officer, a flying safety officer, and a squadron commander. He was airborne during the Marshall Islands atomic bomb tests while serving on a B-17.

Crockett graduated from the U.S. Air Command and Staff College. In 1958, Crockett served as the F-106 Category II Test Program's assistant test director at Edwards Air Force Base in Edwards, California. On June 2, 1959, Crockett was one of the first of several pilots selected to fly at Mach 2 speeds. He briefly served at the North Atlantic Treaty Organization (NATO) in Oslo, Norway.

From 1960 to 1970, Crockett worked with the Pentagon to integrate the Air National Guard.

In 1970, Crockett retired with the rank of lieutenant colonel. He accumulated more than 5,000 flight-time hours and 520 combat hours.

== Post-military career ==
In 1992, Crockett became the first African American to be inducted into the Arkansas Aviation Hall of Fame. In 1994, Crockett accompanied fellow Arkansan and then-President Bill Clinton to attend 50th anniversary commemorative events of World War II's D-Day. In 1995, Crockett was inducted into the Arkansas Black Hall of Fame. In 2001, the University of Arkansas at Little Rock awarded Crockett an honorary doctorate.

In 2007, Crockett, along with entire collective of Tuskegee Airmen, received the Congressional Gold Medal, one of the United States' highest civilian honors.

== Military awards ==
- Distinguished Flying Cross
- Presidential Unit Citation
- Soldier's Medal for bravery for extricating pilots from their burning fighter aircraft in 1944 in Italy
- Soldier's Medal for bravery for extricating pilots from their burning fighter aircraft in 1953 in Korea
- Air Medal with four oak leaf clusters
- Meritorious Service Medal
- Army Commendation Medal
- Air Force Commendation Medal with one oak leaf cluster.

== Death ==
Crockett died from Alzheimer's on August 16, 2012, at the Knollwood military retirement community in Washington, D.C. Both Crockett and his wife Daisy Juanita McMurray Crockett are interred at Arlington National Cemetery in Section 59 Site 31.

== Legacy ==
Crockett's World War II flight suit is displayed at the National Museum of African American History and Culture in Washington, D.C.

== See also ==
- Tuskegee Airmen
- List of Tuskegee Airmen Cadet Pilot Graduation Classes
- List of Tuskegee Airmen
- Military history of African Americans
- Dogfights (TV series)
- Executive Order 9981
- The Tuskegee Airmen (film)
