= Herbert Heywood =

Herbert Heywood may refer to:

- Herbert Heywood (footballer)
- Herbert Heywood (actor)
- Herbert Heywood (pilot)
