= Curtis C. Robinson =

American pharmacist and U.S. Army Air Force officer (1919 - 2009)

- Born: Curtis Christopher Robinson; August 25, 1919; Orangeburg, South Carolina, U.S.
- Died: October 12, 2009 (aged 90); Washington, D.C., U.S.
- Resting place: Arlington National Cemetery, Arlington, Virginia, Arlington County, USA
- Other name: "CC"
- Education: Claflin College, Howard University School of Pharmacy
- Occupations: Military officer; fighter pilot; pharmacist
- Years active: 1942–1947

Curtis Christopher Robinson (August 25, 1919 – October 12, 2009) was an American pharmacist and U.S. Army Air Force officer. He served as a fighter pilot during World War II with the 332nd Fighter Group's 99th Fighter Squadron, a component of the Tuskegee Airmen.

Robinson and his two older brothers were the first African-Americans from one family to become commissioned U.S. military officers.

== Early life and education ==
Robinson was born on August 25, 1919, in Orangeburg, South Carolina. One of six children, Robinson was the son of college graduates and school teachers. The grandson of formerly enslaved African Americans, Robinson attended elementary school, middle school and high school at Claflin College. After high school, Robinson continued at Claflin College, majoring in Chemistry. Robinson hailed from a long line of Chaflin graduates. His grandfather, an AME minister and politician, graduated from Chaflin in 1873. Robinson's parents, uncles and aunts also all graduated from Chaflin.

After graduating from Claflin College in 1940, Robinson became a school teacher in Spartanburg County, South Carolina, where he taught geography, mathematics, history and general science.

In 1945 after returning from World War II, Robinson married Florie Frederick Robinson. They were married for 56 years until Florie's death at the age of 79.

== Military career ==
Curtis C. Robinson's autobiography

As the United States began to ramp up conscription in preparation for World War II, Robinson visited his local Spartanburg County, South Carolina U.S. Army base, Camp Penn. Soon realizing that menial work and demeaning treatment of enlisted African American soldiers were less than ideal, Robinson applied to become an aviation cadet at Tuskegee Army Air Field in Tuskegee, Alabama. In 1942, U.S. Army Air Corps accepted Robinson into Tuskegee's program, sending him first to U.S. Army Air Corps's Shaw AFB in Sumter, South Carolina, for induction. However, the white officers mishandled the new African American inductees based on race, sending Robinson and other African American candidates back to their homes multiple times. In August 1942, the U.S. Army Air Corps finally assigned Robinson to Tuskegee.

On April 29, 1943, Robinson graduated as a member of the Single Engine Section Cadet Class SE-43-D, receiving his silver wings and commission as a 2nd Lieutenant. His classmates included Wilson V. Eagleson ("Swampy") (February 1, 1920 - April 16, 2006), one of the Tuskegee Airmen's most prolific combat fighter pilots credited with two confirmed enemy German aerial kills and two probable aerial kills. In 1943, Robinson and his two older brothers became the first African-Americans from one family to become officers.

The U.S. Army Air Corps assigned Robinson to the 99th Fighter Squadron. Robinson flew 33 combat missions in World War II's European Theater including North Africa and Anzio, Italy. In 1944, the U.S. Army Air Corps sent Robinson back to the United States where he served as a flight instructor for new Tuskegee cadets.

After the war Robinson was posted to Lockbourne AFB (now Rickenbacker Field) in Columbus, Ohio. He subsequently opened, owned and operated several Washington, DC-area pharmacies during the latter period of racial segregation. In January 1947, Robinson left the military with a rank of First Lieutenant.

== Pharmaceutical career ==
In 1947, Robinson relocated to Washington, D.C., with his pregnant wife to work at the National Security Agency. Though Robinson applied to become an airline pilot, no major commercial airline would hire him, discriminating against him on the basis of his race. In 1948, Robinson enrolled at Howard University's School of Pharmacy to pursue a Bachelors of science degree in Pharmacy. After graduating in 1952, Robinson started Washington, DC-area "Robinson Apothecary" pharmacy during the latter period of racial segregation, eventually expanding to six pharmacies. In January 2008, Robinson closed the last of his six pharmacies.

Robinson owned Robnor Publishing, LLC, a company he co-founded with George Norfleet to release Robinson’s autobiography, "A Pilot’s Journey."

Robinson and his family lived in the Hillcrest community of Washington, D.C.

== Honors ==
- In 2003, Howard University School of Pharmacy awarded Robinson its Howard University School of Pharmacy achievement award.
- In 2004, Claflin University inducted Robinson into its Hall of Fame.
- In 2006 the Tuskegee Airmen were awarded the Congressional Gold Medal.

== Death ==
Robinson died on October 12, 2009, in Washington, D.C. He was interred at Arlington National Cemetery, plot sec: 4, Site: 2715-A, in Arlington, Virginia, Arlington County.

== See also ==
- Executive Order 9981
- List of Tuskegee Airmen
- List of Tuskegee Airmen Cadet Pilot Graduation Classes
- Military history of African Americans
