= William H. Holloman =

Tuskegee Airman (1924–2010)

William H. Holloman III
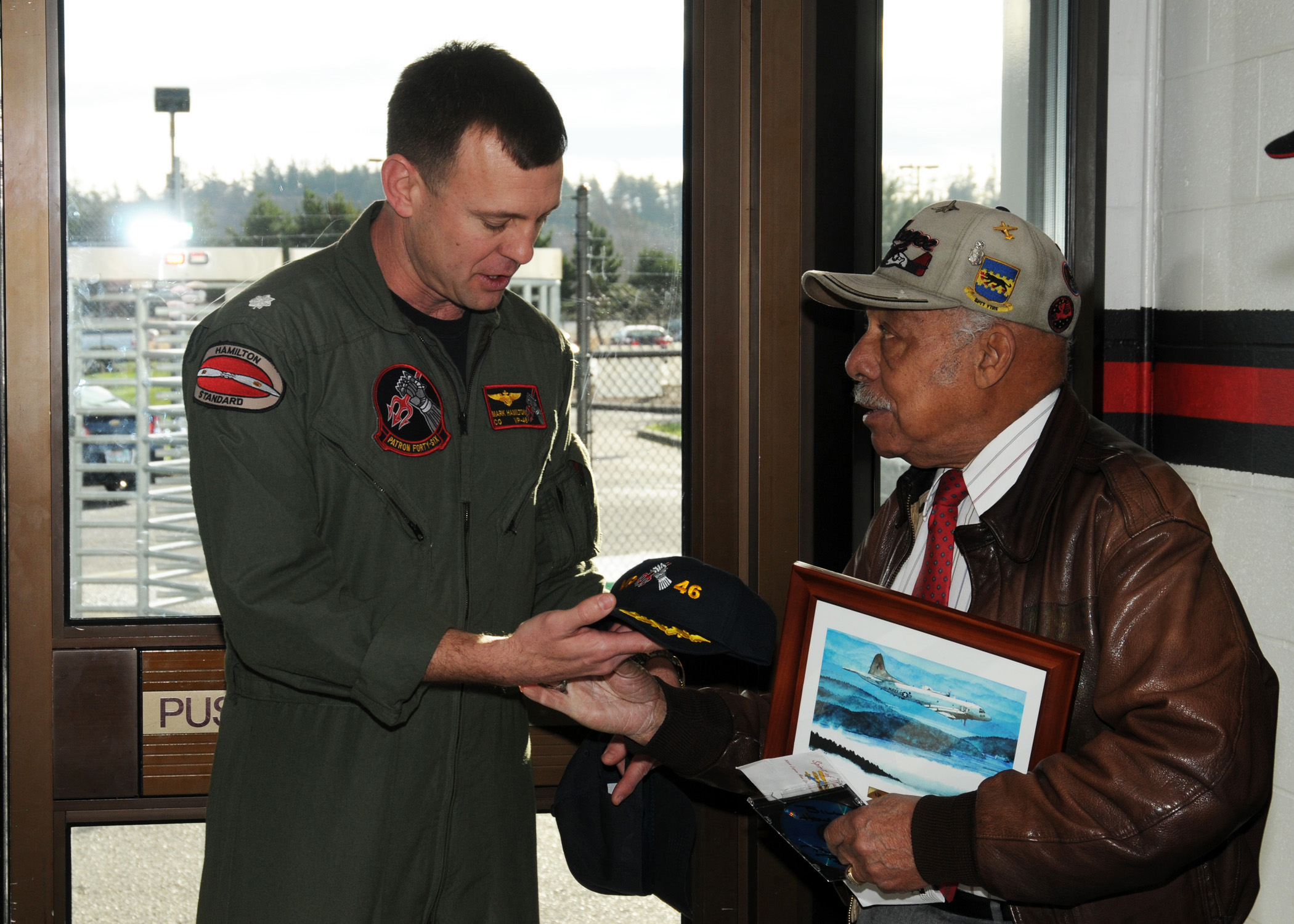
- Born: William Hugo Holloman III; August 21, 1924; Saint Louis, Missouri, US
- Died: June 12, 2010 (aged 86); Kent, Washington, US
- Resting place: Non-Burial
- Other name: Bill
- Education: University of Maryland, University of Washington
- Occupations: Military officer; fighter pilot; helicopter pilot
- Years active: 1942–1972
- Awards: Congressional Gold Medal awarded to the Tuskegee Airmen

William Hugo Holloman III (August 21, 1924 – June 12, 2010) was a U.S. Army Air Force officer, combat fighter pilot, and high-profile member of the prodigious 332nd Fighter Group's 99th Fighter Squadron, best known as the Tuskegee Airmen, "Red Tails", or "Schwarze Vogelmenschen" ("Black Birdmen") among enemy German pilots.

Holloman is best known as the U.S. Air Force’s first African American helicopter pilot.

== Early life and family ==
Holloman was born on August 21, 1924, in Saint Louis, Missouri. His father served as a US Postal Service employee who worked there from 1919 to 1969. He and his family attended a semi-integrated Catholic church attended primarily by families of German and Italian descent. He played youth baseball on integrated teams.

As a young child, Holloman wanted to become a pilot after Medal of Honor winner Charles Lindbergh crossed the Atlantic Ocean in his famed Spirit of St. Louis aircraft in 1927. Rampant racial discrimination prevented African Americans from becoming pilots or pursuing most high-profile opportunities. Nonetheless, Holloman's parents shielded him from Jim Crow racial segregation, encouraging his dreams. He attended an African-American-only school where his grandmother served as principal.

Later in life, Holloman married Artie Adele Holloman. They had six children: William Holloman IV, Michael Holloman, Christopher Holloman, Lesley Holloman, Robyn Holloman, Maria Holloman-Toye.

== Military service ==
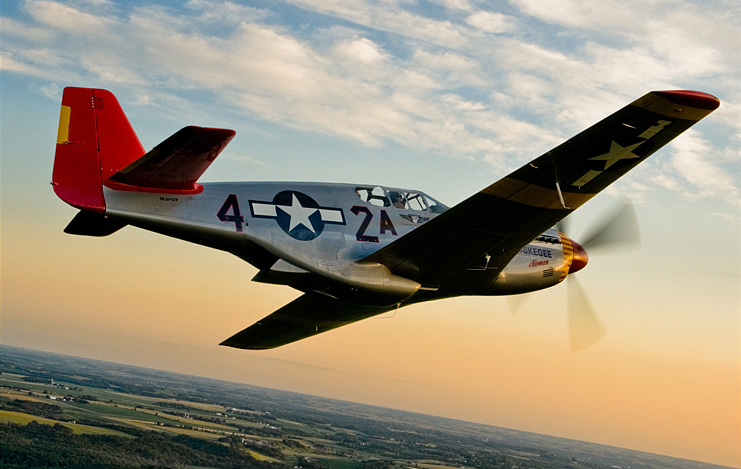
P-51 aircraft with red markings. (Note: The Tuskegee Airmen became known for flying the P-51 aircraft with red markings that distinguished the Tuskegee Airmen included red bands on the noses of P-51s as well as a red rudder; their P-51B and D Mustangs flew with similar color schemes, with red propeller spinners, yellow wing bands and all-red tail surfaces.)

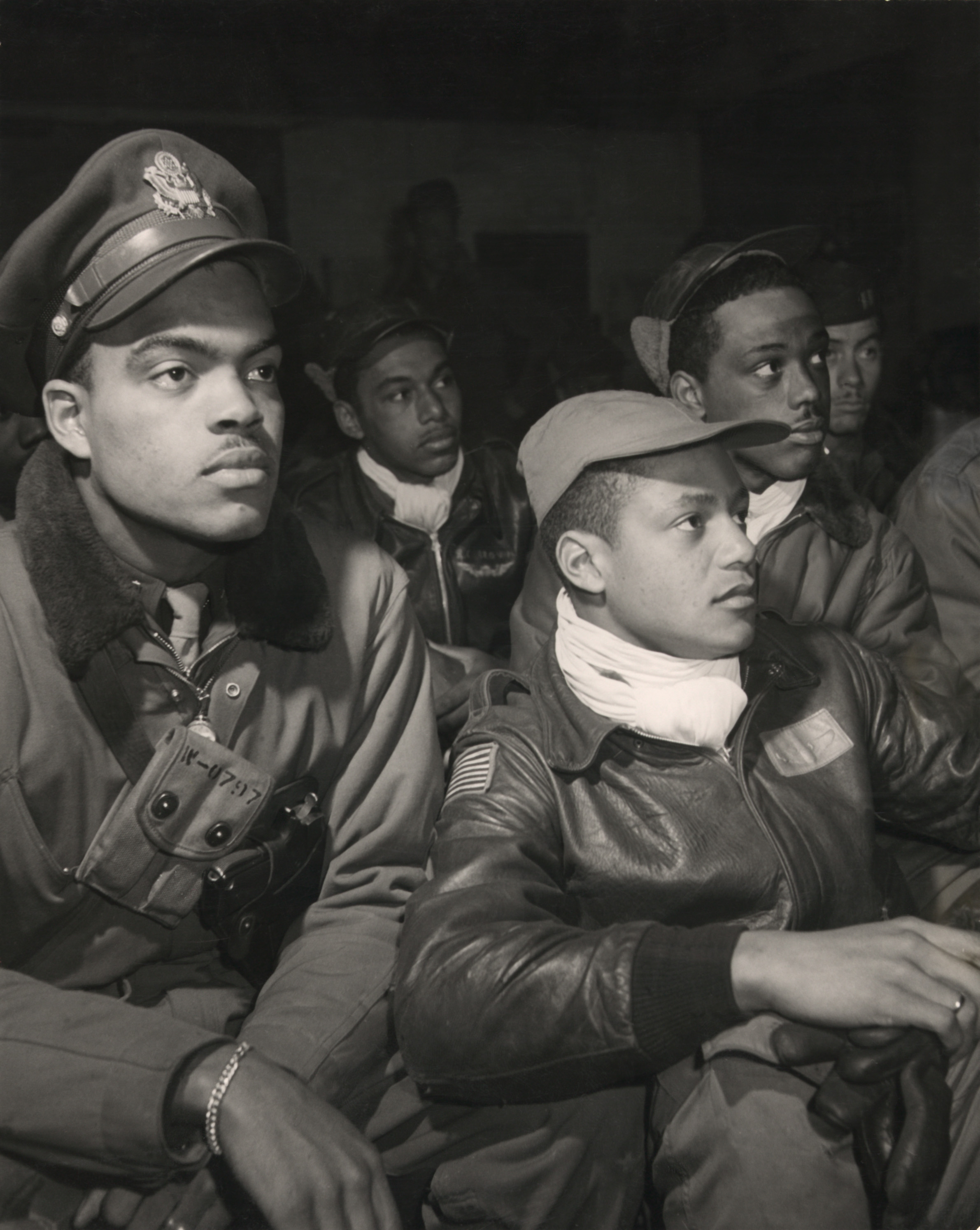
Left to right: Robert W. Williams, (leather cap) William H. Holloman, III, (cloth cap) Ronald W. Reeves,(leather cap) Christopher W. Newman, (flight cap) Walter M. Downs, (Source: Photographer's notes and Tuskegee Airmen 332nd Fighter Group pilots.)

At the age of 16 in 1940, Holloman applied to train as a pilot for the Royal Canadian Air Force. However, the Royal Canadian Air Force required both parents of an underage applicant's permission to enlist. Though Holloman's father gave his consent, his mother denied him, citing his age.

In August 1942 at age 18, Holloman sat for the U.S. Army Air Corps (USAAC)'s aviation cadet training exam. After the U.S. War Department draft board conscripted 18 year old Holloman in November 1942, the USAAC Reserves swore in Holloman as an enlisted man.

While waiting for selection to a Tuskegee Aviation cadet class, Holloman enrolled in college courses at Tuskegee Institute. En route to Tuskegee, Alabama, a white train conductor physically threatened him. Though the USAAC had assigned Holloman to a train's drawing room to help shield Holloman and other African American recruits from potential racial harassment and white supremacist physical assaults, the train conductor tried to force Holloman to shift to a "Jim Crow car" behind the train's hot engine.

Holloman's cousin, a master sergeant, helped bump Holloman's name to a forthcoming cadet class.

On September 8, 1944, he graduated as a member of the Single Engine Section Cadet Class SE-44-H, receiving his wings and commission as a 2nd Lieutenant.

Between 1944 and 1945, Holloman flew 19 strafing, patrol, and bomber escort missions in Eastern Europe including Germany and Austria.

After World War II, Holloman became a USAAC reservist. Outside of the military, he flew crop duster aircraft in Central America and South America and operated small commercial aircraft in Canada. In 1948, Colonel (later General) Benjamin O. Davis Jr. convinced Holloman to return to active duty as a member of the newly integrated U.S. Air Force (USAF). After attending airborne electronics school, he became the USAF's first African American helicopter pilot.

Reactivated to active duty again in 1966 during the Vietnam War, he trained helicopter pilots in Greenland and examined pilots’ instruments as a director of safety and standards. He earned the designation of master aviator, earning over 17,000 military flying hours. He subsequently switched from the USAF to the US Army. In 1972, he retired from the U.S. Army as a Lieutenant colonel.

== Post-military career ==
Holloman attended the University of Maryland where he earned a bachelor's degree in business administration. He also attended the University of Washington, earning a degree in history. He later became a University of Washington professor.

He also served as a technical adviser to the 2009 film, Resurrecting Moton Field: The Birthplace of the Tuskegee Airmen, and to film director and producer George Lucas’ major motion picture, Red Tails.

== Death ==
Holloman died from a heart attack on June 12, 2010, in Kent, Washington, at the age of 85.

== Honors ==
- Congressional Gold Medal Awarded to Tuskegee Airmen in 2006
- The Northwest African American Museum in Seattle, Washington, currently houses Holloman's flight jacket. He attended the 2008 museum opening and delivered a speech on the Tuskegee Airmen.
- In 2010, Holloman gave a rousing pep talk to the Portland State University Football Team.

== See also ==
- Executive Order 9981
- List of Tuskegee Airmen
- List of Tuskegee Airmen Cadet Pilot Graduation Classes
- Military history of African Americans
