= Lincoln Hudson =

American fighter pilot (1916–1988)

Lincoln T. Hudson
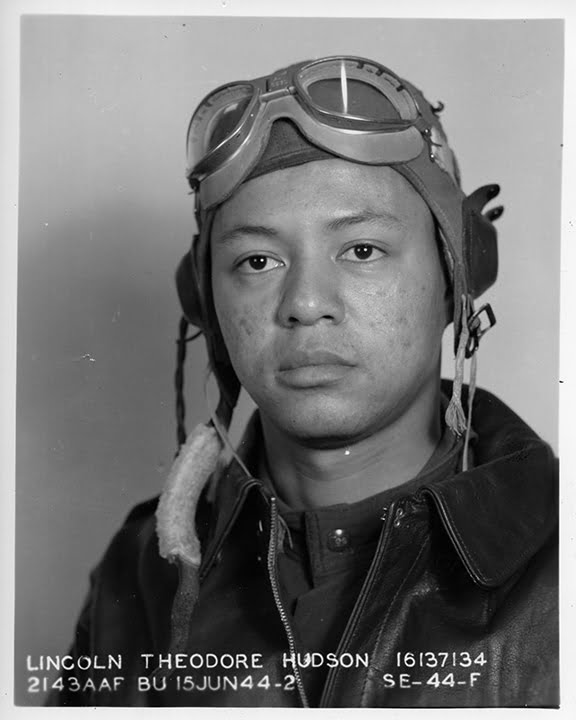
- Born: Lincoln T. Hudson; March 12, 1916; Okmulgee, Oklahoma, US
- Died: September 26, 1988 (aged 72); Chicago, Illinois, US
- Resting place: Lincoln Cemetery - Blue Island, Illinois, Cook County
- Education: Loyola University Chicago, University of Chicago
- Occupations: Military officer; fighter pilot; corporate executive
- Years active: 1944–1946
- Awards: Congressional Gold Medal awarded to the Tuskegee Airmen

Lincoln T. Hudson (March 12, 1916 – September 26, 1988) was a U.S. Army Air Force officer, World War II fighter pilot, Prisoner of War in Nazi Germany, and a corporate executive. During World War II, Hudson served in the all-African-American 332nd Fighter Group's 301st Fighter Squadron, best known as the all-African American combat fighter pilot group, the Tuskegee Airmen, "Red Tails," or among enemy German pilots, “Schwartze Vogelmenschen” ("Black Birdmen").

Hudson served as Senior Vice President of Advertising at Johnson Publishing Company, publishers of the historic African American circulars, Ebony Magazine and Jet Magazine founded by businessman John H. Johnson.

== Awards and honors ==
- Congressional Gold Medal Awarded to Tuskegee Airmen in 2006

== See also ==
- Executive Order 9981
- List of Tuskegee Airmen Cadet Pilot Graduation Classes
- List of Tuskegee Airmen
- Military history of African Americans
- The Tuskegee Airmen (movie)
