= Willie H. Fuller =

American Tuskegee Airman fighter pilot (1919–1995)

Captain Willie H. Fuller
- Fuller c. 1942
- Born: George L. Knox II; August 2, 1919; Tarboro, North Carolina, US
- Died: January 3, 1995 (aged 75); Opa-locka, Florida, US
- Burial place: Monumental Garden South in Dade Memorial Park, Opa-locka, Florida.
- Education: Tuskegee Institute Bachelor's degree Mechanical Industries
- Spouse: Willie (Billie) Dunson Fuller
- Military career
- Allegiance: United States of America
- Branch: United States Army Air Force
- Service years: 1942–1947
- Rank: Captain
- Nickname: Will
- Unit: 332nd Fighter Group
- Awards: Congressional Gold Medal awarded to the Tuskegee Airmen; Air Medal with oak leaf cluster

Willie Howell Fuller (August 2, 1919 – January 3, 1995) was a U.S. Army Air Force/U.S. Air Force officer, combat fighter pilot, and combat flight instructor with the 332nd Fighter Group's 99th Pursuit Squadron, best known as the Tuskegee Airmen or "Red Tails". He was the first black flight instructor for the single engine planes at Tuskegee. He was the only black flight instructor until December 1944. He was one of 1,007 documented Tuskegee Airmen Pilots. He flew 76 combat missions.

On August 5, 1942, Fuller graduated from the Tuskegee Advanced Pilot Cadet program as a member of the fifth-ever Cadet Class Single Engine Section SE-42-G.

As he told Boys' Life: "Everybody figured that we could not fly and deliver under pressure. We wanted to prove that we could." He was later honored by the Dade County (FL) Aviation Department and Florida Memorial College as part of their Blacks in Aviation Celebration for his contributions to the aviation industry.

== Early life ==
Fuller was born on August 2, 1919, in Tarboro, North Carolina. Educated in the Tarboro public schools, Fuller attended Tuskegee Institute, graduating with a bachelor's degree in Mechanical Industries in 1942.

Following his military service, Fuller married Willie (Billie) Dunson Fuller.

== Military career ==
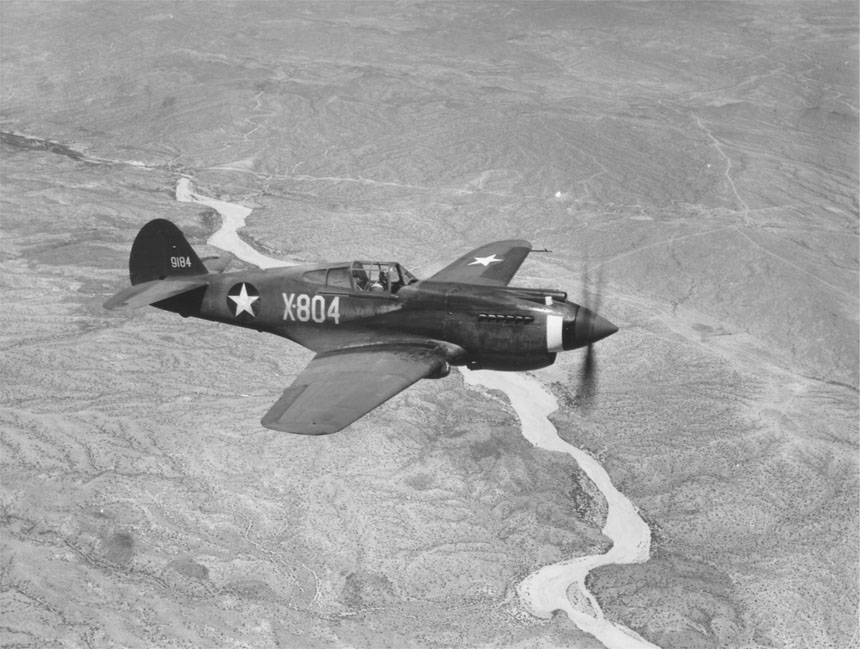
Fuller flew a P-40 which he named after his first wife: Ruthea. (Note: The Tuskegee Airmen trained with the P-40 aircraft. Later the Tuskegee Airmen became known for flying the P-51 aircraft with red markings that distinguished the Tuskegee Airmen included red bands on the noses of P-51s as well as a red rudder; their P-51B and D Mustangs flew with similar color schemes, with red propeller spinners, yellow wing bands and all-red tail surfaces.)

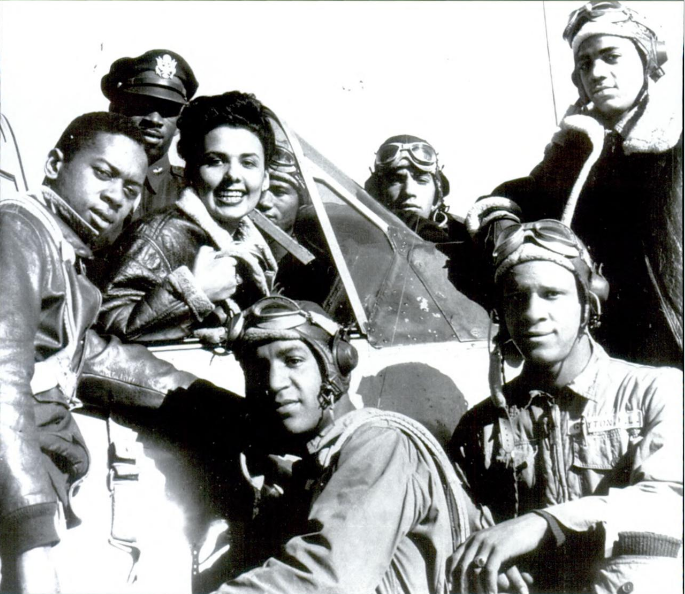
Lena Horne posing with the Tuskegee Airmen in Tuskegee Alabama during World War II. Fuller is behind Horne wearing a cap. (Note: Lena Horne performed for members of the United States military many times. Often she was required to perform for white troops first. She could only perform for the black troops the next day in a separate blacks only mess hall. She performed for the first black pilots, (the Tuskegee airmen) during World War II.)

Fuller received a certificate for military excellence, as a Cadet Second Lieutenant, in May 1940. He was a college student in December 1941, when Pearl Harbor was attacked, and enlisted in the United States army shortly afterwards on March 16, 1942.

On August 5, 1942, Fuller graduated from the Tuskegee Advanced Pilot Cadet program as a member of the fifth-ever Cadet Class Single Engine Section SE-42-G, receiving his wings and commission as a 2nd Lieutenant.

During World War II, Fuller flew 76 combat missions, including combat over Sicily and Italy. Fuller flew with the 99th Fighter Squadron's mission to secure Pantelleria in 1943. He named his P-40 fighter "Ruthea" after his first wife. He earned the Air Medal with oak leaf cluster.

In 1944, Fuller was transferred back to the United States, where he served as a flight instructor in Tuskegee Army Air Field's advanced single-engine flying school. Fuller and several of his fellow airmen posed with actress Lena Horne for a photo during her visit to Tuskegee.

Fuller and several members of the 99th Fighter Squadron were invited to an upscale Atlantic City hotel. The officer managing the event attempted to exclude Fuller from bringing his wife because the officer felt that only Fuller had earned fair treatment. The officer relented, and Fuller took his wife to the hotel.

In 1947, Fuller was discharged from active military duty. He later became a captain in the U.S. Air Force Reserves.

== Awards ==
- Air Medal with oak leaf cluster
- Congressional Gold Medal awarded to the Tuskegee Airmen in 2006
- He was honored in 1993 by the Dade County (FL) Aviation Department and Florida Memorial College's Division of Airway and Computer Sciences for his contribution to aviation.

== Post-military ==
After his service in the military, Fuller trained civilian pilots in North Carolina. Later, he and his wife moved to LaGrange, Georgia, where he created the first African American owned taxi cab company there. He also taught civilian pilots how to fly.

By 1984, Fuller and his wife lived in Miami, Florida, having left Lagrange to work with the Boy Scouts in South Florida; he would serve as District Executive with the South Florida Council, overseeing scouting in Dade, Broward and Monroe Counties. He retired in 1982.

== Death ==
Fuller died of a heart attack on January 3, 1995, at the age of 75. He was interred at the Monumental Garden South in Dade Memorial Park, Opa-locka, Florida.

== See also ==
- List of Tuskegee Airmen Cadet Pilot Graduation Classes
- List of Tuskegee Airmen
- Military history of African Americans
- Dogfights (TV series)
- Executive Order 9981
- The Tuskegee Airmen (movie)
