= Wilmore B. Leonard =

Tuskegee Airmen

- Born: Wilmore B. Leonard; 1916 or 1917; Salisbury, Maryland, US
- Died: April 2, 1978 (aged 61); Washington, DC, US
- Military career
- Allegiance: United States of America
- Branch: United States Army Air Force
- Awards: Congressional Gold Medal awarded to the Tuskegee Airmen

Wilmore B. Leonard (1916 or 1917 – April 2, 1978) was an American college professor, U.S. Army Air Corps/U.S. Air Force officer and combat fighter pilot with the 332nd Fighter Group. One of 1,007 documented Tuskegee Airmen Pilots, Leonard was a member of Tuskegee's sixth cadet graduating class and one of the first 50 African American combat fighter pilots. He served during World War II, retiring from the military in 1946. He subsequently attended the Howard University School of Dentistry, and became a dentistry professor, holding the position for 25 years.

== Early life ==
Leonard was born in Salisbury, Maryland on Maryland's Eastern Shore. He had two siblings, Howard E. Leonard Jr. and Lillian Flamer. In 1939, he graduated from the Hampton Institute. He taught at Accomac County High School in Accomac, Virginia on Virginia's Eastern Shore.

Leonard was married to Elizabeth A. Leonard. They had one daughter, Charmaine L. Jackson, and one grandchild.

== Military career ==
On September 6, 1942, Leonard graduated from the Tuskegee Flight School's Single Engine Section Class SE-42-H, earning his wings and a commission as a 2nd Lieutenant. One of 1,007 documented Tuskegee Airmen Pilots, Leonard was a member of Tuskegee's sixth cadet graduating class and one of the first 50 African American combat fighter pilots. He served in World War II's European Theater. In 1946, Leonard left the military with the rank of captain.

== Awards ==
Congressional Gold Medal Awarded to the Tuskegee Airmen in 2006.

== Post-military career and professorship ==
In 1947, Leonard applied and was provisionally admitted to the University of Maryland's graduate school in the chemistry department. Maryland subsequently rescinded its admissions decision, officially citing dissatisfaction with Leonard's previous average grades, though probably as a result of Leonard's race.

In 1948, Leonard attended the Howard University School of Dentistry, graduating in 1952. He worked there as a professor for 25 years until his retirement in May 1976. He served as Howard's associate director of clinics, secretary to the faculty. He taught oral diagnosis, endodontics, oral therapeutics, pharmacology. Howard University School of Dentistry awarded him the Howard University College of Dentistry Alumni Award for outstanding contributions to dental education. Leonard was a member of the American Dental Association, the National Dental Association, the Robert T. Freeman Dental Society and the District of Columbia Dental Society. He also authored multiple journal articles on periodontology and endodontics.

== Death ==
Leonard suffered from cancer and died on April 2, 1978, at Howard University Hospital in Washington, DC.

== See also ==
- Executive Order 9981
- List of Tuskegee Airmen
- List of Tuskegee Airmen Cadet Pilot Graduation Classes
- Military history of African Americans
