= Clarence C. Jamison =

American Tuskegee Airmen fighter pilot (1918–2014)

- Born: Clarence Clifford Jamison; February 25, 1918; Little Rock, Arkansas, US
- Died: March 6, 2014 (aged 96); Cleveland, Ohio, US
- Resting place: Arlington National Cemetery, Section 60, Site 10604
- Other name: "Jamie"
- Education: University of Chicago
- Occupations: Military officer; fighter pilot
- Years active: 1941–1963
- Awards: Congressional Gold Medal awarded to the Tuskegee Airmen

Clarence Clifford “Jamie” Jamison (February 25, 1918 – March 6, 2014) was a U.S. Army Air Force officer and combat fighter pilot with the 332nd Fighter Group's 99th Fighter Squadron, best known as the all-African American Tuskegee Airmen, "Red Tails," or “Schwarze Vogelmenschen” ("Black Birdmen") among enemy German pilots.

He was one of the first eight African American combat fighter pilots.

Jamison and Lt. Allen G. Lane became the first African American flying instructors at Tuskegee Army Air Field's P-40 transitional school.

== Early life ==
Jamison was born on February 25, 1918, in Little Rock, Arkansas. Jamison's siblings included older brothers Sterling Jamison and Thurston Jamison, and younger siblings Rae Jamison, Alvin Jamison, and Richard Jamison.

In 1923, Richard Sr. and Sallie moved five-year old Clarence and their oldest children to Cleveland, Ohio, leaving Clarence's grandparents, Edward Stewart and Callie Stewart, and the Clarence's younger siblings back in Little Rock, Arkansas. In 1924, the entire family reunited in Little Rock, Arkansas.

Jamison attended Little Rock, Arkansas's Bolton Elementary School and Little Rock Central High School. After graduating from Central, Jamison attended the University of Chicago where he majored in pre-medicine and medical bacteriology, lived with an uncle in Chicago, and worked a part-time job as a bookkeeping machine operator. While at Chicago, Jamison pledged Kappa Alpha Psi fraternity's Iota chapter.

Jamison was married to Phyllis L. Piersawl Jamison for 53 years until her death. They had two children: daughter Michal Jamison Offutt and son Clarence C. Jamison Jr. They had four grandchildren and six great-grandchildren.

== Military Career, World War II, Tuskegee Airmen ==
Interested in becoming a pilot, Jamison applied for the federal government-sponsored Civilian Pilot Training Program. In 1940, Jamison earned his civilian pilot's license, accumulating 72 hours of ground training and 50 hours of flight training. He soon applied for the U.S. Army Air Force's Tuskegee Army Air Field training program. Never receiving a response, Jamison wrote First Lady Eleanor Roosevelt, a staunch proponent of Tuskegee's program. Five weeks later, Jamison was accepted as a Tuskegee Army Air Field training program cadet, enlisting August 21, 1941.

On April 29, 1942, Jamison graduated from the Tuskegee Advance Flying School (TAFS)'s Class Number SE-42-D - Single Engine Section. The U.S. Army Air Corps assigned Jamison to the 332nd Fighter Group's 99th Fighter Squadron.

Jamison flew 67 combat missions in World War II's European Theater including North Africa and Italy. In January 1944, Jamison led his squadron on a patrol mission where it encountered a massive formation of enemy German fighter planes attacking Allied ground positions. Outnumbered two-to-one, Jamison's squadron took the enemy head-on, shooting down five enemy aircraft.

After World War II, Jamison continued to serve in the newly desegregated U.S. Air Force, including assignments as an accounting and finance officer. After 22 years in the U.S. Army Air Corps/U.S. Air Force, Jamison retired in 1963 with the rank of Lt. Colonel.

== Post-Military Career ==
Jamison worked for the Social Security Administration, retiring after 23 years there.

== Awards ==
- Air Medal with seven oak leaf clusters
- Congressional Gold Medal awarded to Tuskegee Airmen in 2006

== Honors, Book ==
- Tuskegee University awarded Jamison an Honorary Doctor of Public Service.
- The City of Cleveland gave Jamison the key to its city.
- President Barack Obama invited Jamison to attend Obama's January 20, 2009 inauguration.

Jamison's life is described in the book, "Memories from Tuskegee: The Life Story of Lieutenant Colonel Clarence C. Jamison as told to James Christ."

== Death ==
Jamison died on March 6, 2014, in Cleveland, Ohio. He was interred at Arlington National Cemetery, Section 60, Site 10604.

== See also ==
- Executive Order 9981
- List of Tuskegee Airmen
- List of Tuskegee Airmen Cadet Pilot Graduation Classes
- Military history of African Americans
