= Vernon V. Haywood =

US Army Air Force pilot and Tuskegee Airman (1920–2003)

- Born: Vernon V. Haywood; October 24, 1920; Raleigh, North Carolina, US
- Died: April 14, 2003 (aged 82); Arizona, US
- Resting place: Arlington National Cemetery, Arlington, Virginia, Arlington County, Virginia
- Education: Hampton Institute (now Hampton University)
- Occupations: Military officer; fighter pilot
- Years active: 1941–1971

Vernon V. Haywood (October 24, 1920 – April 14, 2003) was a U.S. Army Air Force officer, combat fighter pilot/jet pilot, and commanding officer of the 332nd Fighter Group's 302nd Fighter Squadron, a component of the Tuskegee Airmen.

Haywood was one of the U.S. Air Force's first African American jet pilots and first African American jet instructors, sharing these two honors with three other African American officers. In 1993, the Arizona Aviation Hall of Fame inducted Haywood into its Hall of Fame.

== Early life ==
Haywood was born on October 24, 1920, in Raleigh, North Carolina to Ernest S. Haywood and Mary Montague Haywood. One of seven children, Haywood's father worked as a brakeman for a railroad company, while Haywood's mother worked as a housewife caring for their large family.

Haywood graduated from Washington Graded and High School in 1938. He attended Hampton, Virginia's Hampton Institute (now Hampton University) where he obtained his private pilot's license through its 40-hour-flying-hour Civilian Pilot Training Program.

In 1964, Haywood earned a bachelor's degree from the Boot Strap program in Basic General Education at the University of Nebraska Omaha.

Haywood was married to first wife Imogene V. Haywood (1916–1962) until her death in 1962. Haywood later married Alma Haywood, an U.S. Air Force nurse and Captain. They had one son, Vernon Jr., a University of Arizona graduate.

== Military career ==
In 1941, Haywood left Hampton Institute to attend Tuskegee Army Air Field's secondary aviation cadet training where he remained after the Japanese bombed Pearl Harbor. During secondary training, Haywood landed his aircraft in an Alabama pasture after running low on fuel. The pasture was owned by a wealthy Detroit man vacationing at his winter home in Alabama. The owner picked up the stranded Haywood using a chauffeured limousine, giving him cookies and milk until Tuskegee Airfield sent someone to bring him back.

On April 29, 1943, Haywood graduated from Tuskegee's Single Engine Section Cadet Class SE-43-D, receiving his silver wings and commission as a 2nd Lieutenant.

The U.S. Army Air Corps assigned Haywood to the 332nd Fighter Group. In December 1943, U.S. Army Air Corps moved Haywood from Michigan's Selfridge Field to Italy. After serving as Flight Commander and the Operations Officer, he eventually became the 302nd Fighter Squadron's commanding officer. In World War II's European Theater, Haywood flew 70 missions throughout Europe including Austria, Italy, Germany, Romania, southern France, Poland, and the edge of Russia. In 1945, the U.S. Army Air Corps sent Haywood back to the United States. he is credited with one official kill, downing an enemy German 302 aircraft on October 21, 1944, earning him the Distinguished Flying Cross.

During one mission, Haywood and his squadron were mistakenly fired upon by British gunners as they flew back to base after a patrol mission on the coast of Italy.

After World War II, Haywood became Tuskegee Air Field Instrument School's Assistant Director. After the U.S. Army Air Corps closed Tuskegee's pilot training in 1946, Haywood was assigned to the 477th Bombardment Group at Lockbourne AFB.

In 1949, the U.S. Air Force transferred Haywood and three other African American officers to Arizona's Williams AFB to train jet pilots. Haywood, Henry B. Perry ("Herky"), Lewis Lench, and John L. Whitehead Jr. ("Mr. Death") became the U.S. Air Force's first African American jet pilots and jet instructors. After training jet pilots for four years, Haywood served in Japan, the Philippines, and Vietnam. In 1966, Haywood commanded the 4454th Fighter Squadron, a McDonnell Douglas F-4 Phantom II squadron at Tucson, Arizona's Davis Monthan AFB. In 1969, Haywood served in Vietnam in a non-pilot role. In 1970 he became special assistant to the commander of the Military Aircraft Storage and Disposition Center in Tucson, Arizona. He retired from the air force with the rank of colonel on October 17, 1971. In his entire military career, Haywood logged over 6,000 fighter hours.

== Post-military career ==
In 1976, Haywood graduated from the University of Arizona with a Bachelors of Science degree in Public Management.

== Commendations, awards ==
- Legion of Merit
- Distinguished Flying Cross
- Air Medal with 4 oak leaf clusters
- Joint Service Commendation Medal
- Outstanding Unit Award
- Euro-Africa-Middle Eastern Campaign Medal with 3 battle stars
- Korean Service Medal
- Vietnam Service Medal
- Air Force Longevity Service Ribbon with 5 oak leaf clusters

== Honors ==
- In 1993, the Arizona Aviation Hall of Fame selected Haywood as a member of its Hall of Fame.
- The General Assembly of North Carolina filed a joint house resolution honoring Hayward and fellow Tuskegee Airmen from North Carolina.

== Death ==
Haywood died on April 14, 2003. He was 82. He was interred at Arlington National Cemetery, plot Sec: 35, Site: 4597, in Arlington, Virginia, Arlington County, Virginia.

== See also ==
- Executive Order 9981
- List of Tuskegee Airmen
- List of Tuskegee Airmen Cadet Pilot Graduation Classes
- Military history of African Americans
