= James O. Plinton Jr. =

U.S. Army Air Force pilot, member of Tuskegee Airmen

- Born: July 22, 1914; Westfield, New Jersey, US
- Died: July 4, 1996 (aged 81); Lake Wales, Florida, US
- Resting place: Fairview Cemetery, Westfield, New Jersey
- Education: Lincoln University
- Occupations: Military officer; fighter pilot; airline executive
- Years active: 1942–1946

James O. Plinton Jr. (July 22, 1914 – July 4, 1996) was a U.S. commercial airline executive, commercial airline entrepreneur, and former U.S. Army Air Corps flight officer, pilot and flight instructor with the 332nd Fighter Group's 99th Fighter Squadron (best known as the Tuskegee Airmen). Plinton Jr. was one of the first African Americans to serve as an executive for a major U.S. commercial airline.

== Early life ==
Plinton Jr. was born on July 22, 1914, in Westfield, New Jersey. He was the son of Mary Williams Plinton, a Virginia native, and James O Plinton Sr. (1881–1967), a Jamaican immigrant from Savanna-la-Mar, Jamaica who migrated to New York in 1904. Plinton Sr. was one of a handful of individuals who survived the June 15, 1904 PS General Slocum passenger steamboat fire at Hell Gate in New York's East River that killed over 1,000 people. Plinton escaped by swimming two miles to safety. Plinton Sr. studied Dentistry at the New York School of Prosthetic Dentistry. In 1908, Plinton Sr. established the Westfield Dental Laboratory. In 1918, Plinton Sr. was awarded New Jersey's Craftsmanship Award in Gold lingual Bar. He retired from the practice of Dentistry in 1952. Plinton Sr. and wife Mary had four children: Plinton Jr., daughter Ursula E. Plinton, son W. Hollis Plinton Sr. and son Kermit W. Plinton.

As a young child, he was denied membership in the Westfield YMCA and entry into its swimming pool based on his race. Later in life, he would become the President of the National YMCA.

Following his father's insistence that he enter into the medical professional, he attended Lincoln University in 1931, graduating with a bachelor's degree in Biology in 1935. After graduation, Plinton Jr. worked for the U.S. Postal Service and the Merchant Marine.

In 1941, he enrolled at the University of Newark's Division of Aeronautics, earning a commercial pilot's license and flight instructor's rating in November 1941.

He was married to Kathryn Hancock Plinton until her death in 1993. They had two children: daughter Kathryn Plinton Roman and son James O. Norman Plinton.

== Military flight career ==
At the beginning of America's involvement in World War II, he volunteered for the U.S. Army Air Corps. He was stationed at Tuskegee Institute where he became a civil flight instructor and later the manager of its civilian flying field where he was in charge of the training for all flight instructors. He became one of the 99th Fighter Squadron's first African American flight instructors, training 150 pilots, many of them bound for combat in World War II's European Theater.

Though the date is not documented, he graduated from Tuskegee's Service Pilot Cadet Training as a Flight Officer. He rose to the rank of Captain.

== Commercial airline career ==
In the late 1940s and 1950s, Plinton Jr. unsuccessfully acquired a commercial airline job as a pilot, turned down by major U.S. commercial airlines based on his race. Instead of pursuing lawsuits against U.S. airlines, Plinton Jr. focused outside of the United States, working with former Tuskegee Airmen Pilot and St. Croix, Virgin Islands native Henry E. Rohlsen to organize Ecuador's national airline, Andesa, Latin American Airlines, and Haiti's Haitian International Airlines headquartered in Port-au-Prince, Haiti. On April 3, 1947, he visited Los Angeles to buy two Grumman amphibious planes to be used by Haitian International Airlines to carry mail, passengers and cargo in the Caribbean. Plinton Jr. believed that Wall Street executive railroaded/sabotaged he and Rohlsen's fledgling airline businesses. Henry E. Rohlsen Airport, a public airport located 6 miles (9.7 km) southwest of Christiansted on the island of St. Croix in the United States Virgin Islands, is named after Rohlsen.

Plinton Jr. received a citation from the Governor of the Grand Turk Island for landing the first aircraft there.

Returning to the United States in August 1957, Plinton Jr. used personal connections to interview at Trans World Airlines, becoming an executive assistant to the director of personnel and industrial relations. He became the first African American to serve as an executive with a major U.S. commercial airline.

In 1971 he became a vice president at Eastern Airlines, making him the highest ranking African American for a U.S. commercial airline at the time. Though he retired from Eastern Airlines in 1980, Eastern Airlines's chairman and former astronaut Frank Borman, asked him to remain as a special assistant for additional year.

A civic leader, he served as the executive director of the Metropolitan Fellowship of Churches in Florida. He also served as chairman of the Tacolcy Economic Development Corporation.

== Death ==
On July 4, 1996, aged 81, he died of cancer at the Lake Wales Medical Center Extended Care Facility in Lake Wales, Florida. He was interred at Fairview Cemetery in Westfield, New Jersey.

== Legacy ==
In 2006, the New Jersey Aviation Hall Of Fame posthumously inducted Plinton Jr. into its Hall of Fame.

== See also ==
- Executive Order 9981
- List of Tuskegee Airmen
- List of Tuskegee Airmen Cadet Pilot Graduation Classes
- Military history of African Americans
