= Herbert V. Clark =

American fighter pilot

Major Herbert V. Clark
- Herbert V. Clark – 1955
- Born: Herbert V. Clark; March 16, 1919; Pine Bluff, Arkansas, US
- Died: January 25, 2003 (aged 83); Blacksburg, Virginia, US
- Military career
- Allegiance: United States of America
- Branch: United States Army Air Force; United States Air Force
- Service years: 1942–1955
- Rank: Major
- Nickname: Bud
- Unit: 332nd Fighter Group
- Awards: Congressional Gold Medal

Herbert Vanallen Clark (March 16, 1919 – January 25, 2003) (WIA) was a U.S. Army Air Force/U.S. Air Force officer, and combat fighter pilot. He first served in combat with the all-African American 332nd Fighter Group in World War II, best known as the Tuskegee Airmen. He completed two tours of duty, completing ten missions on his second tour. In 1944, Clark's aircraft was shot down over Italy, and was reported as missing in action. He was picked up by the Italian resistance, evading enemies for eight months before rejoining his unit. He retired with a rank of major.

== Early life, family ==
Clark was born on March 16, 1919, in Pine Bluff, Arkansas, Jefferson County, Arkansas. His mother was a high school mathematics teacher and his father, John F. Clark, was the pastor of the St. Paul's Baptist Church.

== Military career ==
In 1942, he signed up for the U.S. government's Civilian Pilot Training Program (CPTP). After completing the CPTP, he entered basic training. Clark attended the Tuskegee Cadet Pilot program, graduating from its Single Engine Section Class SE-42-F on 3 July 1942 and receiving his wings and commission as a 2nd Lieutenant. He was then assigned to the 332rd Fighter Group's 99th Pursuit Squadron. He participated in several missions around Sicily, including Pantelleria and Sciacca. By 5 November 1943, he completed his first combat tour and returned to the United States. Along with other veterans of the 99th Squadron, he declined to return with the 332nd when it left for Italy on December 24, 1943; fellow veteran Charles W. Dryden attributed this to low morale in his memoir. Clark was stationed at Selfridge, Michigan where he became a flight instructor for the 553d Fighter-Bomber Squadron.

Clark began a second combat tour in Europe, during which he completed ten missions. On 16 August 1944, Clark's aircraft was shot down by flak 1.5 miles (2.4 km) north of Miane, Italy. He was seen parachuting from his burning aircraft, and was listed as missing in action. He suffered a head wound when he struck a tree parachuting to the ground, and was immediately picked up by the Italian resistance who sheltered him for eight months. During his time with the resistance, Clark led a group of partisans attacking German positions in northern Italy. On 4 May 1945 he returned to Allied lines. According to the Fifteenth Army Air Force, "nothing short of pandemonium would describe the reactions ... when everyone realized that the group's own 'Bud Clark' had actually returned".

Clark retired with the rank of major.

== Awards ==
- Congressional Gold Medal awarded to the Tuskegee Airmen in 2006

== Death and influence ==
Clark died on January 25, 2003, at the age of 83. He was interred at the Westview Cemetery in Blacksburg, Virginia, Montgomery County, Virginia. The Fifteenth Army Air Force reported that Clark had innovated as a pilot by landing his P-40 Warhawk on one wheel while returning from a dive bombing mission over the Anzio Beachhead. Dr. Henry Foster knew Clark as a child and was influenced by his war stories, pursuing work at an air force base and learning to fly. When he realized that none of the Tuskegee Airmen could find work with the U.S. airlines due to their practice of hiring only white pilots. (Delete last sentence)

== See also ==
- Executive Order 9981
- List of Tuskegee Airmen
- List of Tuskegee Airmen Cadet Pilot Graduation Classes
- Military history of African Americans
- Fly (play) (2009 play about the 332d Fighter Group)
