= Alfred Gorham =

Tuskegee Airman (1920–2009)

Lieutenant Colonel Alfred M. Gorham
- 2nd lieutenant Alfred Gorham in 1944
- Born: 1920; Waukesha, Wisconsin, U.S.
- Died: 2009 (aged 88–89)
- Burial place: Arlington National Cemetery
- Military career
- Allegiance: United States of America
- Branch: United States Army Air Forces
- Service years: 1942-1946
- Rank: Lieutenant colonel
- Unit: 332nd Fighter Group
- Commands: 301st Fighter Squadron
- Awards: Purple Heart; Congressional Gold Medal awarded to Tuskegee Airmen; POW Medal

2nd Lt. Alfred M. Gorham (1920 – 2009) (POW) was a Tuskegee Airman from Waukesha, Wisconsin. He was the only Tuskegee Airman from Wisconsin, and he was a prisoner of war after his plane went down over Munich, Germany in World War II.

== Military service ==
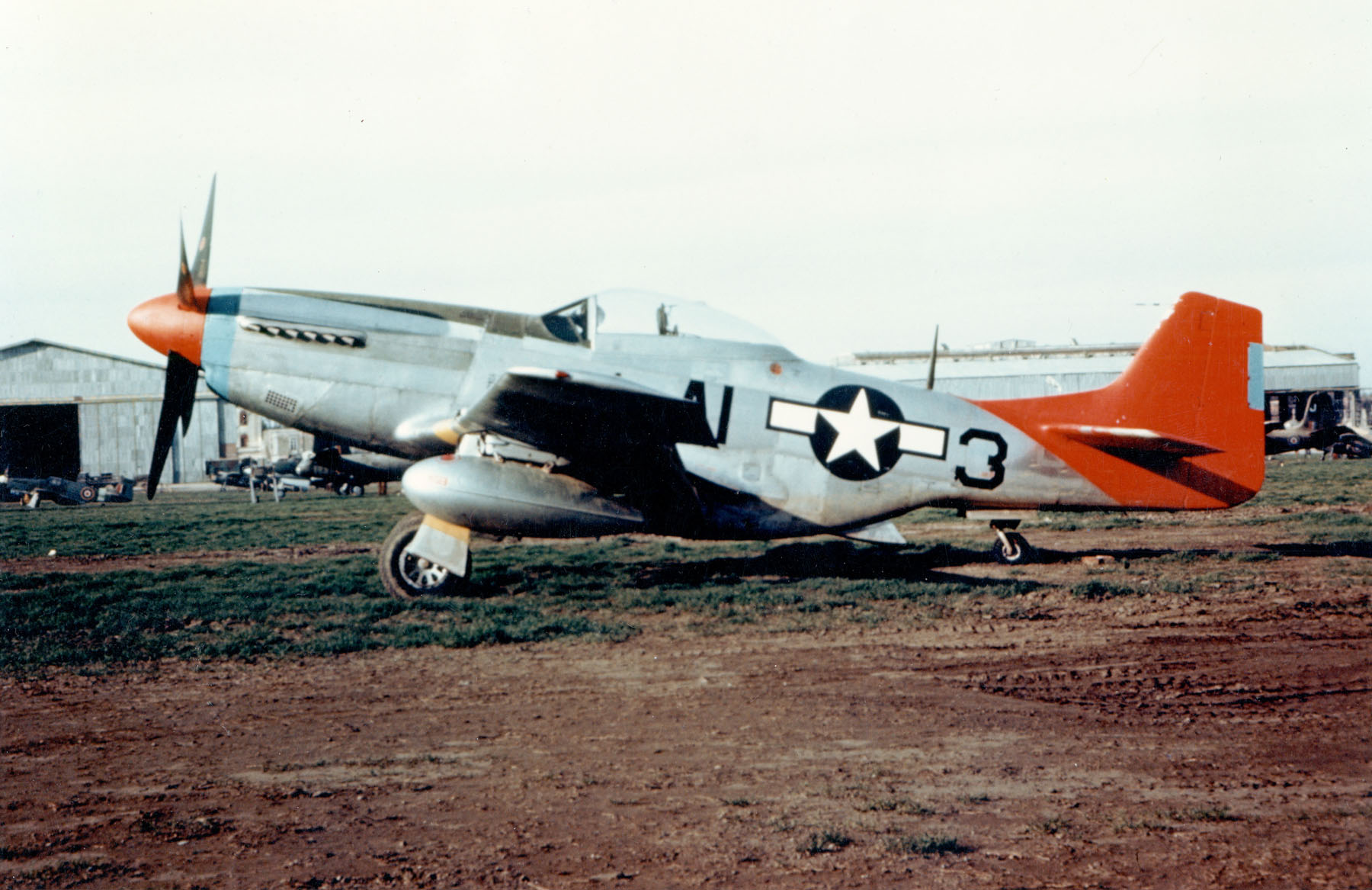
The Tuskegee Airmen's aircraft had distinctive markings that led to the name, "Red Tails." (Note: The red markings that distinguished the Tuskegee Airmen included red bands on the noses of P-51s as well as a red rudder; their P-51B and D Mustangs flew with similar color schemes, with red propeller spinners, yellow wing bands and all-red tail surfaces.)

After joining the Army Air Force in 1942 Gorham became a pilot with the Tuskegee Airmen. He graduated from the Tuskegee University February 8, 1944.

He saw action over Budapest Hungary and shot down two German Focke-Wulf Fw 190 Fighters on August 3, 1944.

In 1945 his P-51 had engine trouble over Munich, Germany and he bailed out. He was captured and held by the Germans until the end of the war.

== Awards ==
- Purple Heart
- Prisoner of War Medal
- Congressional Gold Medal awarded to Tuskegee Airmen in 2006

== See also ==
- Executive Order 9981
- List of Tuskegee Airmen
- List of Tuskegee Airmen Cadet Pilot Graduation Classes
- Military history of African Americans

== Personal life ==
After graduating from Waukesha High School in 1938 Gorham was accepted to Carroll College. However he took a job as a precision tool grinder. He later enlisted in the army and eventually he was accepted to the Tuskegee Airmen.
