= Walter L. McCreary =

U.S. Army Air Forces officer

- Born: Walter Lee McCreary; March 4, 1918; San Antonio, Texas, US
- Died: December 20, 2015 (aged 97); Columbus, Ohio, US
- Resting place: Forest Lawn Memorial Gardens, Columbus, Ohio, US
- Education: Tuskegee Institute (now Tuskegee University)
- Occupations: Military officer; fighter pilot
- Years active: 1941–1963

Walter Lee McCreary (March 4, 1918 – December 20, 2015) (POW) was a U.S. Army Air Forces/U.S. Air Force officer, former prisoner of war (POW), and one of the original combat fighter pilot with the 332nd Fighter Group's 100th Fighter Squadron, best known as the Tuskegee Airmen. He was one of the first hundred African American fighter pilots in history, as well as one of 1,007 documented Tuskegee Airmen Pilots.

During his 90th mission on October 22, 1944, German anti-aircraft fire shot down McCreary's aircraft. After bailing and parachuting from his damaged aircraft near Lake Balaton in Hungary, McCreary was accosted by angry civilians until enemy German soldiers interceded and captured him, transporting him to several prison camps. McCready eventually landed at the Stalag Luft III POW camp near Budapest, Hungary. Held in captivity for 9 months, McCready was liberated on April 29, 1945, when General George Patton and his army captured the camp.

McCreary's hometown African American newspaper, the San Antonio Register ran a November 10, 1944, headline on its front page announcing McCreary's capture by the Germans.

== Early life and family ==
McCreary was born on March 4, 1918, in San Antonio, Texas. He was the son of Daisy Novella McCreary and James Walter McCreary, a railroad worker. He attended Phyllis Wheatley High School (now Brackenridge High School, graduating in 1935.

McCreary attended Tuskegee Institute (now Tuskegee University) in Tuskegee, Alabama, majoring in business administration.

After graduating from Tuskegee Institute in 1940, McCreary earned his civilian pilot's license through the Civilian Pilot Training Program.

In 1942 McCreary Married Elaine McCreary from New Orleans Louisiana and a graduate from Southern University, they lived in New Orleans for 6 years. They had 2 Daughters Sylvia McCreary and Andrea McCreary, before divorcing in 1949. In 1950, McCreary married Dorothy McCreary, a Columbus, Ohio, native who attended East High School and Ohio State University. They had 3 children: twin sons Walter Lee and William Allen who both died in infancy in 1951 and Stephanie McCreary Lynch. McCreary. McCreary also has 3 Grandchildren Allen Joseph Parks Jr., Allison Elaine Vann, (Frank Vann) and Nicolas Lynch and 4 Great Grandchildren, Stephen Earl Lendsey-Vann, Sydnie Elaine Lendsey-Vann, Skylar Ezekiel Lendsey-Vann and Amir Vann

McCreary was a member of Alpha Phi Alpha fraternity.

== Military service, Tuskegee Airmen, Stalag Luft III POW ==
After graduating from Tuskegee Institute, McCreary was drafted by the U.S. Army. On March 25, 1943, Walter graduated as a member of the Single Engine Section Cadet Class SE-43-C, receiving his silver wings and commission as a 2nd Lieutenant. He was then assigned to the 332nd Fighter Group's 100th Fighter Squadron.

During World War II's European Theater, McCready flew 89 combat missions in P-39, P-47 and P-51 aircraft. He named his aircraft "Skipper’s Darling." McCready's missions included bomber escort, strafing and patrol over France, Germany, Italy, Austria, Romania, Poland, Greece, Hungary and Yugoslavia.

During his 90th mission on October 22, 1944, to strafe German armaments in Hungary, German anti-aircraft flak severely damaged McCreary's P-51 aircraft. After bailing from his aircraft near Lake Balaton, McCreary was accosted by angry civilians until enemy German soldiers interceded and captured him, transporting him to several prison camps. McCready eventually landed at the infamous multinational German POW camp, Stalag Luft III, near Budapest, Hungary. McCreary's hometown African American newspaper, the San Antonio Register ran a November 10, 1944, headline on its front page announcing McCreary's capture by the Germans.

Held in captivity for 9 months, McCreary was liberated on April 29, 1945, when General George Patton captured Stalag III, freeing all POWs.

After World War II, the U.S. Army Air Corps transferred McCreary to Lockbourne AFB (now Rickenbacker AFB in Columbus, Ohio.

In 1963, McCreary retired from the U.S. Air Force with the rank of lieutenant colonel.

== Post-Military ==
After leaving the U.S. military, McCreary worked as the deputy director of the Ohio Department of Finance and Administrative Services, retiring in 1983 after 20 years. He also served as a volunteer bookkeeper for his local Columbus, Ohio YMCA, retiring at the age of 80.

== Honors ==
- In 2006, Tuskegee University awarded McCready a Doctor of Public Service honorary degree.
- In 2006 the Tuskegee Airmen were awarded the Congressional Gold Medal.
- On September 16, 2009, the U.S. Air Force and the Air Force Association Air & Space Conference and Technology Exposition honored Tuskegee Airmen McCready, Charles McGee, Elmer Jones, and several members of the Doolittle Raiders with Lifetime Achievement Awards at the National Harbor in Oxon Hill, Maryland.

== Death ==
On December 20, 2015, McCreary died from heart failure in Columbus, Ohio. He was 97 years and one of the last living members of the Tuskegee Airmen. McCreary was interred at Forest Lawn Memorial Gardens in Columbus.

== See also ==
- Executive Order 9981
- List of Tuskegee Airmen
- List of Tuskegee Airmen Cadet Pilot Graduation Classes
- Military history of African Americans
