= Richard H. Harris =

Civil rights leader and pharmacist (1918–1976)

- Born: Richard Henry Harris, Jr. September 22, 1918; Montgomery, Alabama, United States
- Died: July 24, 1976 (aged 57)
- Education: Xavier University of Louisiana
- Occupations: Civil rights leader and pharmacist

Richard Henry Harris, Jr. (August 22, 1918 – July 24, 1976) was a prominent civil rights leader and pharmacist. A personal friend, neighbor and collaborator of Dr Martin Luther King Jr. in Montgomery, Alabama, Harris was instrumental in three of the most seminal protests of the U.S. civil rights movement: the Freedom Riders, the Montgomery Bus Boycott and the Selma to Montgomery marches. Harris's home, best known as the famed "Richard Harris House", was Montgomery's central command center and safe haven for beaten and bloodied Freedom Riders as they traveled to Jackson, Mississippi, amidst physically violent racial rioters, National Guard protection, and Alabama segregationist authorities’ call for martial law.

In 2018, the World Monuments Fund (WMF) listed Harris’ home on its World Monuments Watch list of 20 threatened cultural sites not only for the potential risk to its physical structure, but the potential risk to its historical significance and backstory.

A former U.S. Army Air Force Captain, Harris was one of the U.S. military's first African-American combat fighter pilots, serving with the 332nd Fighter Group's 99th Fighter Squadron, best known as the Tuskegee Airmen, "Red Tails", or "Schwartze Vogelmenschen" ("Black Birdmen") among enemy German pilots.

== Early life, education, family, personal life ==
Harris was born on August 22, 1918, in Montgomery, Alabama. He was the son of Richard Henry Harris, Sr. (1888–February 1, 1944) and Evelyn "Everlena" Cook Jones (1884–1974). In 1907, Harris Sr founded and operated Dean Drug Store, Montgomery's oldest African-American drug store. The store was located at 147 Monroe Street in Montgomery's historically African-American business district. When Harris Sr. died in 1944, his wife Evelyn assumed ownership. The store was listed to the National Register of Historic Places before the city demolished it in the 1980s.

Harris was also the maternal grandson of John W. Jones, an Alabama state senator during Reconstruction.

Harris attended Alabama State College laboratory school for primary and secondary school. The Harris Family later moved to Tuskegee, Alabama, where they lived with the Foster Family, the maternal grandparents of famed musical performer and songwriter Lionel Richie.

Harris attended the now -defunct Tuskegee Military Academy for Boys, graduating on May 23, 1935. In 1937, Harris graduated from Williston Academy for boys (now the Williston Northampton School in East Hampton, Massachusetts, a college preparatory school.

In late 1937, Harris enrolled at the prestigious Fisk University in Nashville, Tennessee, graduating with a bachelor's degree in mathematics in 1941. Though he relocated to Chicago, Illinois, to attend graduate school, Harris plans changed after the U.S. selective service drafted him to the US military.

During his US military training at the Walterboro Air Field in Walterboro, South Carolina, Harris met Vera McGill, a Charleston, South Carolina native. On September 5, 1945, the couple married at Godman Field in Louisville, Kentucky. They had four children: Adrian Harris, Valda Harris, Richard Harris III, and John Harris.

== Military service, Tuskegee Airmen ==
In 1942, the U.S. Army Air Corps admitted Harris to its aviation cadet program in Tuskegee, Alabama. On June 30, 1943, Harris graduated as a member of the Single Engine Section Cadet Class SE-43-F, receiving his wings and commission as a 2nd Lieutenant. The US Army Air Corps assigned Harris to the 332nd Fighter Group's 99th Fighter Squadron.

In 1946, the US Army Air Corps discharged Harris with the rank of captain.

== Post-military career ==
After leaving the US military in 1946, Harris returned to Montgomery, Alabama, working at his mother’s Dean Drug Store located at 147 Monroe Street, under the tutelage of pharmacist Russell Smith. In May 1953, Harris graduated with a pharmacy degree from the Xavier University of Louisiana School of Pharmacy in New Orleans, Louisiana. After returning to Montgomery, Harris became Dean Drug Store’s owner and operator.

== Civil rights leadership, friendship with Dr. Martin Luther King Jr. ==
A personal friend, neighbor and collaborator of Dr. Martin Luther King Jr., Harris was instrumental in three of the most seminal protests of the U.S. civil rights movement: the Freedom Riders, the Montgomery Bus Boycott and the Selma to Montgomery marches. At age 26, Harris helped Dr. King organize Montgomery protests, leading the charge in communication and transportation. Wearing a phone headset at his pharmacy, Harris simultaneously dispatched vehicles while filling prescriptions for his customers. He also lent out his Dean Drug Store as a secure meeting space for civil rights meetings.

Harris’s historic Centennial Hill neighborhood home, best known as the “Richard Harris House”, was Montgomery's central command center for thirty-three beaten and bloodied Freedom Riders protesters from Nashville, Tennessee, making their way to Jackson, Mississippi, between May 20 and May 24, 1961 to protest segregation in interstate transportation. White racist rioters attacked the Freedom Riders as they arrived at the Montgomery Greyhound Bus Station, beating them with baseball bats and iron pipes. The National Guard brought the wounded Freedom Riders to Harris’ home where Harris fed them and provided them with medicines.

Civil rights leaders Dr. Martin Luther King Jr., Rev. Ralph D. Abernathy, James Farmer, John Lewis, and Diane Nash met at Harris's home to develop strategy to buffer and support the Freedom Riders' protests.

Harris also collaborated with Dr. King followed famed civil rights activist Rosa Parks’s 1955 arrest for refusing to switch seats on a segregated local transit bus, prompting the Montgomery Bus Boycott. Harris used his pharmacy's parking lot as a routing center for African-American citizens requiring transportation to their jobs in lieu of riding the public buses.

In March 1965, Harris worked with local African-American physicians at St. Jude’s Hospital to treat African-American protesters beaten up by law enforcement at the Selma to Montgomery marches for voting rights.

== Legacy ==
- In 1992, Harris's home was listed to the Alabama Register of Historic Places as a contributing property of the Centennial Hill Historic District.
- In 2018, the World Monuments Fund (WMF) listed Harris's famous home on its WMF's World Monuments Watch list, a list of 20 threatened cultural sites. The fund added Harris’ home to its registry not only because of potential risk to the home's structure, but the potential risk of the home's history during the Civil rights movement.

== See also ==
- Executive Order 9981
- List of Tuskegee Airmen
- List of Tuskegee Airmen Cadet Pilot Graduation Classes
- Military history of African Americans
