= William N. Alsbrook =

American inventor and combat fighter pilot

William N. Alsbrook, Sr.
- Born: William Noel Alsbrook; January 31, 1916; Kansas City, Kansas, US
- Died: January 5, 1998 (aged 82); Springfield, Illinois, US
- Resting place: Camp Butler National Cemetery in Springfield, Illinois
- Education: University of Kansas
- Occupations: Military officer; fighter pilot; inventor
- Years active: 1943–1946

William Noel Alsbrook, Sr. (January 31, 1916 – January 5, 1998) was an American inventor and combat fighter pilot with the 332nd Fighter Group's 99th Fighter Squadron, best known as the Tuskegee Airmen, "Red Tails," or "Schwartze Vogelmenschen" ("Black Birdmen") among enemy German pilots.

== Early life ==
Alsbrook was born on January 31, 1916, in Kansas City, Kansas. He was the son of Elgeitha Dorothy Stovall Alsbrook, a school teacher, and Irving Adolphus Alsbrook, who died when Alsbrook was very young. Along with his mother and brothers James Alsbrook and Adolphus Alsbrook, Alsbrook lived with his maternal grandparents – Elizabeth Stovall, a cook and janitor, and Jerry Stovall, a butcher at a local packing company. After Jerry died, the Stovall-Alsbrook matriarchs supported the family.

Alsbrook's brother, James, became a prominent sports reporter, writer and editor at Kansas City's The Plaindealer (billed as "[t]he oldest race newspaper in the Southwest"), the St. Louis Call, The Call (Kansas City), the Baltimore Afro-American newspapers, and the Courier-Journal in Louisville. James also served as a professor and director of public relations at Central State University in Wilberforce, Ohio.

In 1935, Alsbrook attended the University of Kansas where he studied mathematics. He also worked as a porter for Beard & Gabelman (B & G) Clothing Stores of Kansas City to support himself.

Interested in piloting aircraft since childhood, Alsbrook transferred to the Tuskegee Institute to enroll in its aviation program.

On October 5, 1943, Alsbrook married Louise M. Brown Alsbrook. They had two children: son William Jr, who was born while Alsbrook was stationed in World War II’s European Theater, and son Reginald. The Chicago Sunday Tribune's February 25, 1945, edition featured Louise and 12 other military wives who had given birth to babies while their husband served overseas. As part of its story, the Chicago Sunday Tribune made arrangements to send each father, including Alsbrook, a secured V-mail to see their children for the first time.

== Military service, Tuskegee Airmen ==
The U.S. Army Air Corps admitted Alsbrook to its Advanced Flight School at Tuskegee Air Force Field. On October 1, 1943, Alsbrook graduated as a member of the Single Engine Section Cadet Class SE-43-I, receiving his wings and commission as a 2nd Lieutenant. The U.S. Army Air Corps assigned Alsbrook to the 332nd Fighter Group’s 99th Fighter Squadron.

During World War II, Alsbrook flew 80 combat missions, including missions in Italy and Austria. A decorated combat fighter pilot, Alsbrook was awarded the Distinguished Flying Cross and 4 Bronze Battle Stars.

== Post-Military, Inventions, Patents ==
After World War II, Alsbrook attempted to become a commercial airline pilot but was denied employment based on his race. To support his family, Alsbrook worked for Zenith Electronics as a television and electronics technician until his retirement in 1982. He was one of the first African American technicians at Zenith.

Credited with over 12 inventions, Alsbrook is best known for inventing a patented industrial process to maintain freshness during the commercial distribution of sandwich products. Patenting his idea two years before his death in 1998, Alsbrook willed the patent to his son Reginald who leveraged the invention into patented plastic wrappers known as the Pull Out Pouch Packaging System (P.O.P.P.S), through the Alsbrook family's business, Diana's Homegrown. The Alsbrook family rolled out its patented products in over 16 Target stores, and at the Kirtland Air Force Base, through a five-year, $1MM contract with the National Nuclear Security Administration, a division of the Department of Energy.

== Death ==
Alsbrook died on January 5, 1998, in Springfield, Illinois. He is interred at Camp Butler National Cemetery, Plot CREMB, 0, 311, in Springfield, Illinois, Sangamon County.

== Legacy ==
- Alsbrook's flight jacket worn during a World War II strafing mission in Austria on November 19, 1944, is displayed at the National Museum of the U.S. Air Force's Tuskegee Airmen Exhibit in its WWII Gallery.

== See also ==
- Executive Order 9981
- List of Tuskegee Airmen
- List of Tuskegee Airmen Cadet Pilot Graduation Classes
- Military history of African Americans
