= Lawrence E. Campbell, Jr. =

African-American military pilot

Lawrence E. "Larry" Campbell, Jr. (1926–1992) was the first African American to fly a jet (F-80) in the U.S. Air Force in 1948, first African-American member of the Alaska Air National Guard and the first African-American group commander of the U.S. Air National Guard.

== Early Military Career ==
As a volunteer for the U.S. Armed Services in 1944, he tested for and joined the Tuskegee Airmen cadet pilot training program in the 332d Fighter Group but was released from service at the close of World War II. Having rejoined his flight training in 1947, he was graduated from the United States Air Force as a second lieutenant in 1948, and went on after honorable discharge to serve in the U.S. Air Force Reserves, and then 176th Tactical Airlift Group, now 176th Wing, of the Alaska Air National Guard. His experiences of growing up under segregation, and moving beyond same, including his own action in filing a racial discrimination complaint against his supervisor at the Alaska Field Office of the National Transportation and Safety Board, are described in his oral history and archival records which are held at the National Air and Space Museum.

== Later Service and Honors ==
In 1966 he was selected by Alaska's governor as the state's representative to the American Foundation for Negro Affairs conference in Philadelphia. In 1972, he received the Air Force Commendation Award for outstanding achievement, and retired in 1973 at the rank of colonel. In 1992 he received the Alaska Legion of Merit, the state's highest military honor, and the Certificate of Distinguished Public Service.
