= Carl C. Johnson =

American military personnel (1926–2023)

Colonel Carl Johnson
- Born: Carl Johnson; April 27, 1926; Bellaire, Ohio, U.S.
- Died: August 28, 2023 (aged 97)
- Military career
- Allegiance: United States
- Branch: United States Army Air Force
- Service years: 1945–1976
- Rank: Colonel
- Unit: 477th Fighter Group
- Awards: Distinguished Flying Cross; Air Medal (10)

Carl Croston Johnson (April 27, 1926 – August 28, 2023) was an American U.S. Army Air Force and U.S. Army officer. He was the final Tuskegee Airmen cadet pilot graduate.

== Early life ==
Carl Croston Johnson was born on April 27, 1926, in Bellaire, Ohio, on the border between Ohio and West Virginia near Wheeling, West Virginia. Though he grew up during Jim Crow racial segregation, Johnson attended a racially integrated high school. Johnson attended Ohio State University, where he studied in preparation to become a dentist. After being discharged from active duty in the US Army Air Force in 1947, Johnson met his future wife, Nancy, when he resumed his studies at Ohio State University.

== Military career ==
In 1945, Johnson was drafted into the US Army.

== Personal life and death ==
Carl had a daughter, Karen Warren, and son, Michael Johnson, in addition to three grandchildren and six great-grandchildren. He lived in the Potomac Green community of Ashburn, Virginia. He died on August 28, 2023, at the age of 97.

== Awards and commendations ==
- Distinguished Flying Cross, Vietnam
- Ten (10) Air Medals

== Honors ==
- In 2007, Johnson and the collective Tuskegee Airmen received the Congressional Gold Medal.
- On May 1, 2021, the town of Ashburn, Virginia, the Loudoun County, Virginia Sheriff’s Office and several veterans organizations honored Johnson with a parade in celebration of his 95th birthday.
- On August 14, 2021, Johnson was the only Documented Original Tuskegee Airman to attend the Tuskegee Airmen Association’s induction of US Air Force Chief of Staff General Charles Q. Brown as an honorary member.
- On May 29, 2021, the American Legion Post 2001 honored the ailing Johnson with a battery powered wheelchair.

== See also ==
- Executive Order 9981
- List of Tuskegee Airmen
- Military history of African Americans
- The Tuskegee Airmen (movie)
