= Herbert Heywood (pilot) =

American aviator

Herbert Hosea Heywood (November 10, 1923 – May 8, 1982) was an aviator. He is best known as a member of the historic Tuskegee Airmen, being one of the few Virgin Islanders to do so and the first Black pilots in the United States armed forces.

== Early life and background ==
Herbert Heywood was born in Christiansted, Saint Croix, which is one of the islands that make up the U.S. Virgin Islands. At the time of his birth, a major political transition happened, as the islands had only recently become a U.S. possession after being purchased from Denmark in 1917. This shifting political climate shaped the environment in which he was raised.

Heywood married Catalina Cena Cepeda on May 23, 1948, at Holy Cross Catholic Church on St. Croix.

He worked in public office after his time as a Tuskegee Airmen, being elected to the 8th and 9th St. Croix Municipal Councils between 1951 and 1954. Known for his creativity and passion for aviation, he incorporated flying into his political campaigns—dropping campaign leaflets over communities from the air.

Later in life, he worked as a supervisor of accounting at Harlem Hospital in New York City. Heywood died May 8, 1982, in New York City.

== Career and contributions ==
On March 22, 1943, Herbert Heywood left St. Croix to enlist in the U.S. military during World War II. At a time when racial discrimination limited opportunities for Black servicemen, he pursued his ambition to become a pilot.

He trained at the Tuskegee Institute in Alabama, established by Booker T. Washington, where African American men were able to be given the opportunity to receive formal flight training.

Heywood became one of approximately 996 men trained as pilots, navigators, and bombardiers. These men became known as the Tuskegee Airmen. He graduated as a 2nd Lieutenant from Class 44-C-SE on March 12, 1944.

He was one of only two Virgin Islanders to achieve this distinction, alongside Henry E. Rohlsen.

After completing his military service, Herbert Heywood pursued higher education and graduated from the Columbia Law School.

== Legacy ==
Herbert Heywood is remembered as a pioneering figure in Virgin Islands history and as part of the broader legacy of the Tuskegee Airmen, whose service helped challenge racial barriers in the U.S. military.

Efforts to preserve the history of Virgin Islands veterans—including Heywood—are reflected in initiatives such as the Virgin Islands Military Museum and Veterans Memorial, which honors thousands of veterans from the territory, including members of the famed 332nd Fighter Group.
