= Robert B. Tresville =

Tuskegee Airman fighter pilot (1921–1944)

Captain Robert B. Tresville Jr
- Born: Robert B. Tresville Jr; May 9, 1921; Galveston, Texas
- Died: June 24, 1944 (aged 23); Mediterranean Sea, off Fascist Italy
- Burial place: Tablets of the Missing at the Sicily–Rome American Cemetery and Memorial in Italy
- Alma mater: Lafayette College
- Spouse: Vivien Louise (nee Murphy)
- Relatives: One daughter
- Military career
- Allegiance: United States of America
- Branch: United States Army Air Force
- Service years: 1942–1944
- Rank: Captain
- Unit: 332nd Fighter Group
- Awards: Air Medal; Purple Heart; Congressional Gold Medal awarded to Tuskegee Airmen

Robert B. Tresville Jr. (May 9, 1921 – June 24, 1944) (MIA) was an African American pilot who served in the original 332nd Fighter Group of the United States Army Air Forces, also known as the Tuskegee Airmen, during World War II. He was only the seventh African American to graduate from West Point. He was Commanding Officer of the 100th Fighter Squadron and was widely considered to be one of the 332nd Fighter Group's most promising leaders. He went missing in action after his plane went down over the Mediterranean Sea in June 1944.

== Early years ==
Originally named Robert Leslie Tresville, Robert was born on May 9, 1921, to parents, Robert Bernard Tresville and Irma Eloise (née Jones) in Galveston, Texas. They later moved to Fort Huachuca in Arizona where his father, the band leader for the 9th Cavalry Regiment band, was posted. Robert's middle name was later changed from Leslie to Bernard making him Robert Bernard Tresville Jr. Shortly after his birth his father was transferred to Fort Benning in Georgia and became director of the 24th Infantry Regiment band. Robert had two younger siblings: a sister who died shortly after birth and a brother named Brittingham. Tresville graduated with honors from high school in 1938 and entered Pennsylvania State College. Shortly thereafter Congressman Arthur Mitchell appointed Tresville to West Point after his first year. Captain Robert Bernard Tresville Jr.married Vivien Louise (née Murphy) in 1943 and had a daughter who was born after his death.

== World War II ==
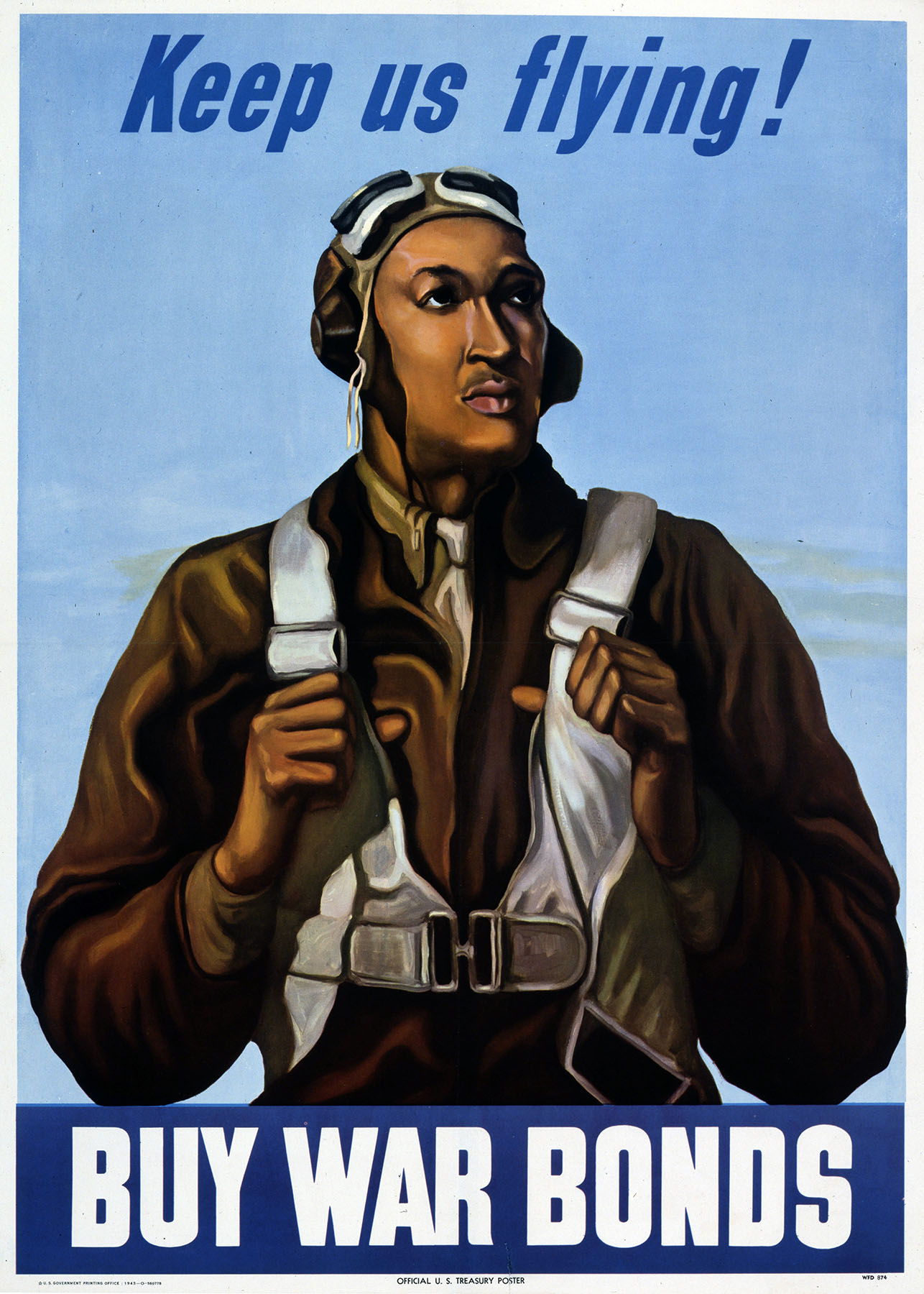
Color poster of a Tuskegee Airman

Tresville applied for pilot training while at West Point and was sent to Tuskegee Army Air Field where he was trained as a single engine pilot. He graduated as a member of Class 42-K on December 13, 1942, and then traveled back to West Point where he was commissioned a Second Lieutenant in the Regular Army of the United States. In December 1943, Tresville was appointed Commanding Officer of the 100th Fighter Squadron succeeding the command of Lieutenant Elwood Driver. As part of the 332nd Fighter Group, Tresville and the 100th Fighter Squadron were deployed to Europe and arrived in Italy on January 29, 1944.

On June 24, 1944, Tresville was assigned to lead a mission over the Mediterranean Sea to strafe an enemy supply line located west of Airasca, Italy. The group was instructed to fly low to avoid being picked up by enemy radar. Nearing the target Tresville was unable to correct his plane as it slid off course and plunged into the water. Lieutenant Woodrow Crockett took over command of the group after Tresville's plane crashed and led them safely back to Ramitelli Air Field in Italy. Tresville is among the names listed on the Tablets of the Missing at the Sicily–Rome American Cemetery and Memorial in Italy.

Prior to his death, Tresville had successfully completed 23 missions and had distinguished himself both in terms of the leadership and courage that he displayed. These traits earned him the respect and admiration of his fellow pilots.

== Awards ==
- Air Medal
- Purple Heart.
- Congressional Gold Medal awarded to the Tuskegee Airmen in 2006

== See also ==
- Dogfights (TV series)
- List of Tuskegee Airmen
- Military history of African Americans
- The Tuskegee Airmen (movie)
