= National Register of Historic Places listings in Spotsylvania County, Virginia =

Location of Spotsylvania County in Virginia

This is a list of the National Register of Historic Places listings in Spotsylvania County, Virginia.

This is intended to be a complete list of the properties and districts on the National Register of Historic Places in Spotsylvania County, Virginia, United States. The locations of National Register properties and districts for which the latitude and longitude coordinates are included below, may be seen in an online map.

There are 17 properties and districts listed on the National Register in the county.

This National Park Service list is complete through NPS recent listings posted February 6, 2026.

== Current listings ==
	Name on the Register	Image	Date listed	Location	City or town	Description
1	Andrews Tavern	Andrews Tavern	July 30, 1976 (#76002121)	2.6 miles (4.2 km) northeast of Glenora on Lawyers Rd. 38°07′19″N 77°46′09″W	Glenora	Federal provincial home constructed for Samuel Andrews in 1815. Around 1848, a frame wing was added to the brick structure for a tavern.
2	Fairview	Fairview	December 30, 1993 (#93001460)	2020 Whitelake Dr. 38°14′25″N 77°30′51″W	Fredericksburg	Federal-style home built in 1837 by Samuel Alsop, Jr., architect and builder who designed a number of buildings in Spotsylvania
3	Fredericksburg and Spotsylvania County Battlefields Memorial National Military Park	Fredericksburg and Spotsylvania County Battlefields Memorial National Military Park	October 15, 1966 (#66000046)	Fredericksburg and western and southwestern areas in Spotsylvania County; 38°17′34″N 77°28′09″W	Fredericksburg	Extends into Fredericksburg and other nearby counties.
4	Kenmore	Kenmore	June 24, 1993 (#93000569)	8300 State Route 208; 38°11′07″N 77°35′48″W	Spotsylvania Courthouse	Also known as Kenmore Woods - not to be confused with Kenmore (Fredericksburg, Virginia)
5	La Vista	La Vista	December 1, 1997 (#97001508)	4420 Guinea Station Rd. 38°10′07″N 77°29′27″W	Guinea	Federal / Greek revival house built in 1838.
6	La Vue	La Vue	January 11, 1994 (#93001459)	Southern side of U.S. Route 17 at its junction with the Richmond, Fredericksburg and Potomac Railroad tracks 38°13′09″N 77°26′35″W	Fredericksburg	Formerly known as Prospect Vue. The home was built in 1848 for John Alsop.
7	Lansdowne	Lansdowne	February 5, 2013 (#12001270)	4919 Lansdowne Rd. 38°15′17″N 77°28′22″W	Fredericksburg	
8	Massaponax Baptist Church	Massaponax Baptist Church	January 24, 1991 (#90002137)	Junction of U.S. Route 1 and Massaponax Church Rd. 38°11′37″N 77°30′36″W	Massaponax	Built in 1859 and site of council of war with Grant, Meade, and other Union generals
9	Oakley	Oakley	May 22, 2002 (#02000533)	10000 Corbin Ln. 38°14′08″N 77°42′25″W	Spotsylvania Courthouse	Built in 1828 by Samuel Alsop, Jr.
10	Prospect Hill	Prospect Hill	September 9, 1982 (#82004597)	1507 Monrovia Rd. 38°07′28″N 77°52′43″W	Mineral	Built in 1811/1812 for local politician Waller Holladay. Plantation was the site of the 1st Post Office in Spotsylvania County (1809)
11	Rapidan Dam Canal of the Rappahannock Navigation		July 26, 1973 (#73002063)	Extending from the mouth of the Rapidan River down the Rappahannock River for 1.5 miles (2.4 km); 38°21′07″N 77°36′17″W	Spotsylvania Courthouse	Best preserved section of the Rappahannock Navigation, a 19th-century effort to open 50 miles of the Rappahannock River to navigation
12	St. Julien	St. Julien	June 5, 1975 (#75002038)	South of Fredericksburg between State Route 2 and Thornton Rolling Rd. 38°13′08″N 77°24′50″W	Fredericksburg	Home of prominent Virginia republican Francis Taliaferro Brooke
13	Spotsylvania Court House Historic District	Spotsylvania Court House Historic District	September 8, 1983 (#83003317)	State Route 208; 38°12′00″N 77°35′16″W	Spotsylvania Courthouse	
14	Stirling	Stirling	May 5, 1989 (#89000366)	Guinea Station Rd. at Interstate 95; 38°10′54″N 77°30′10″W	Massaponax	
15	Sylvania Plant Historic District	Sylvania Plant Historic District	February 13, 2020 (#100004980)	11900, 11800, and 11700 blocks of Main St. 38°16′44″N 77°26′54″W	Fredericksburg	
16	Tubal Furnace Archeological Site	Tubal Furnace Archeological Site	October 19, 1982 (#82001825)	Address Restricted; 38°19′52″N 77°36′41″W	Chancellor	Oldest iron furnace in Virginia, one of the oldest in the United States
17	Walnut Grove	Walnut Grove	August 20, 2004 (#04000889)	Belmont Rd., west of Spotsylvania; 38°09′50″N 77°51′54″W	Spotsylvania Courthouse	Built in 1840 by William A. Jennings for Jonathan Johnson

== Former listing ==
	Name on the Register	Image	Date listed	Date removed	Location	City or town	Description
1	Bloomsbury Farm	Bloomsbury Farm	May 8, 2000 (#00000479)	February 7, 2017	9736 Courthouse Rd. 38°14′02″N 77°33′58″W	Spotsylvania Courthouse	Also known as Harris Farm; site of the Harris Farm Engagement during the American Civil War. Demolished in 2014.

== See also ==
- List of National Historic Landmarks in Virginia
- National Register of Historic Places listings in Virginia
- National Register of Historic Places listings in Fredericksburg, Virginia
