= Kenmore =

Kenmore may refer to:

== Places ==
=== Australia ===
- Kenmore, Queensland, a suburb of Brisbane
- Kenmore Hills, Queensland, a suburb of Brisbane
- Kenmore House, Rockhampton, Queensland, a mansion
- Kenmore Asylum, a decommissioned psychiatric hospital in Goulburn, New South Wales
  - Kenmore railway station

=== United States ===
- Fenway–Kenmore, a neighbourhood of Boston, Massachusetts
  - Kenmore station, on the MBTA Green Line
  - Kenmore Square, a square
- Kenmore (Richmond, Massachusetts), a historic house
- Kenmore, New York, a village in Erie County
- Kenmore, Akron, Ohio, a neighborhood
- Kenmore station (GCRTA), in Shaker Heights, Ohio
- Kenmore (Fredericksburg, Virginia), a plantation house
- Kenmore (Spotsylvania County, Virginia), a historic house
- Kenmore, Washington, a city near Seattle
  - Kenmore Air Harbor, Lake Washington
  - Kenmore Air Harbor Seaplane Base, Lake Union
- Kenmore Farm, a historic farm in Amherst, Virginia
- Kenmore Hotel, a historic building in Albany, New York

=== Other places ===
- Kenmore, Ontario, Canada
- Kenmore, Perth and Kinross, Scotland

== People ==
- Peter E. Kenmore (fl. 1994), American agricultural entomologist
- Kenmore Hughes (born 1970), sprinter from Antigua and Barbuda

== Other ==
- Kenmore (brand), an American brand name of household appliances
- Kenmore Air, an American airline
- Kenmore Australian Football Club, in Chelmer, Queensland, Australia
- Kenmore High School, a former public high school in Akron, Ohio, U.S.
- Kenmore State High School, in Brisbane, Australia
- USS Kenmore, the name of several ships

== See also ==
- Kenmore House (disambiguation)
- Kenmoor (disambiguation)
- Ken More (1907–1993), Canadian politician
- Clair Kenamore (c. 1875 – 1935), American newspaper journalist
- Hotel Kenmore Hall, in Manhattan, New York, U.S.
