= Oakley (Spotsylvania County, Virginia) =

Historic house in Virginia, United States

- U.S. National Register of Historic Places
- Virginia Landmarks Register
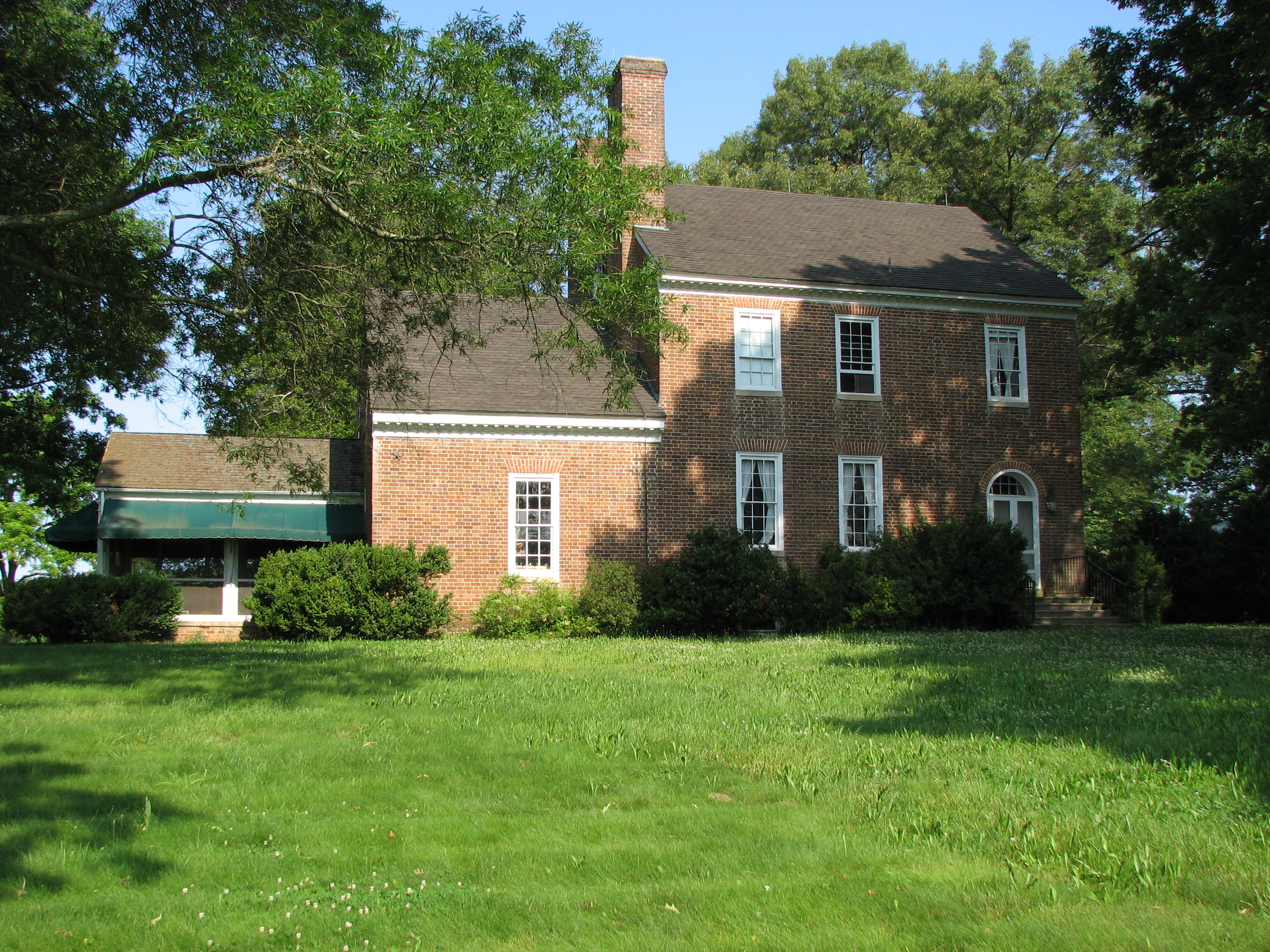
- The home at Oakley in Spotsylvania County, Virginia

- Location within Northern Virginia Location within Virginia Location within the United States
- Location: 10,000 Corbin Ln., Spotsylvania, Virginia
- Coordinates: 38°15′25″N 77°42′31″W
- Area: 12 acres (4.9 ha)
- Built: 1828
- Built by: Alsop, Jr., Samuel
- Architectural style: Federal / Georgian
- NRHP reference No.: 02000533
- VLR No.: 088-0052

Significant dates
- Added to NRHP: May 22, 2002
- Designated VLR: March 14, 2001

Oakley is a historic plantation and home located in Spotsylvania County, Virginia, Virginia. The Federal/Georgian style, 2 1/2-story home was built in 1828 by Samuel Alsop, Jr. as a wedding present for his daughter, Clementina. Alsop built several notable houses in Spotsylvania County including Kenmore, Spotswood Inn, and Fairview.

Oakley was part of a grant of 7,777 acres (3,147 ha) given to Gawain Corbin by the King of England. Alsop bought 849 acres (344 ha) in 1816. The Georgian home was built using bricks made in two kilns that Alsop built on the property.

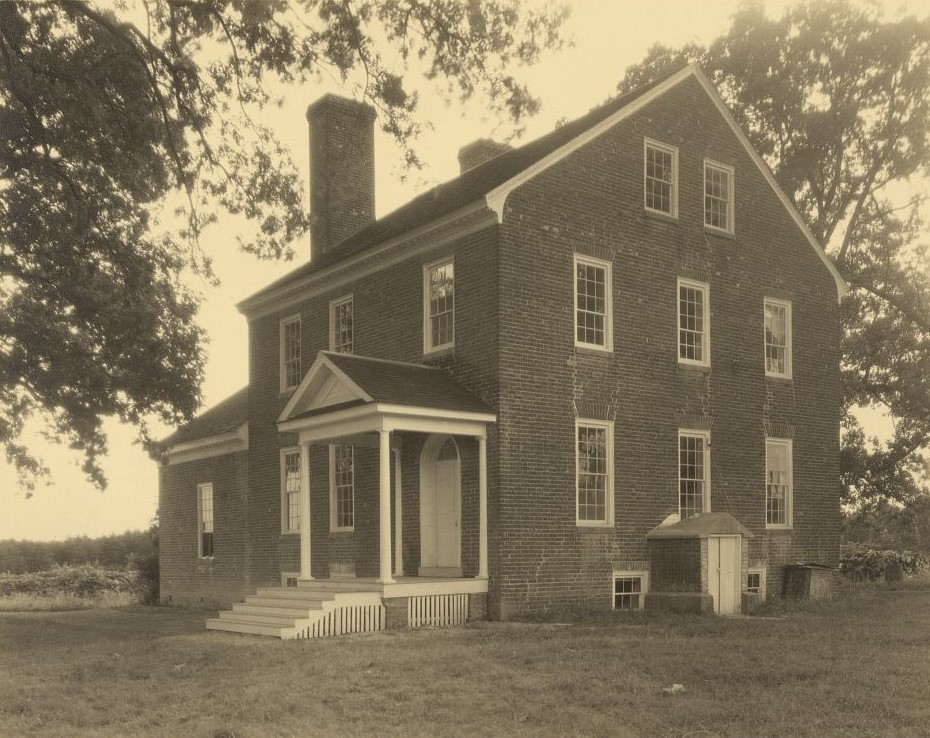
Oakley, by Frances Benjamin Johnston, 1935

Oakley is located near the site of many major battles of the American Civil War. A number of battles and skirmishes occurred on or near the property. According to a letter written by a resident of the house at the time, during one two-day period, the house was ransacked by "...at least 2000 soldiers tramping through the house." A Yankee soldier disobeyed his Major's orders to burn the house down.

During the latter half of the 19th century, the house was neglected and used more as a barn than a home. In 1919, the property was purchased by a Mr. McHenry who wanted to mine for silver and gold. The mining project failed and, in 1926, the plantation was sold to George C. Beals. The property has been owned by the Beals since then. Running water and electricity were added in the 1940s and central heating in the 1960s.

As of 2005, the Oakley farm consisted of nearly 2,000 acres (810 ha). Oakley was added to the National Register of Historic Places in May 2002.
