= Kenmore House =

Kenmore House may refer to:

== Australia ==
- Kenmore House, Rockhampton, a heritage-listed house in Queensland

== United States ==
- Kenmore (Richmond, Massachusetts), a historic house
- Kenmore (Fredericksburg, Virginia), a heritage-listed plantation house
- Kenmore (Spotsylvania County, Virginia), a heritage-listed house
