= Walter Lawson =

Walter Lawson may refer to:

- Walter I. Lawson, U.S. Army Air Force/U.S. Air Force officer
- Walter C. Lawson, lawyer and political figure in New Brunswick, Canada
- Walter Lawson (RAF officer), British flying ace of the Second World War
- Walter Lawson, the Earth alias of Marvel Comics character Mar-Vell
