= La Vista =

La Vista may refer to:

- La Vista, Nebraska, a city in Nebraska
- La Vista (Spotsylvania County, Virginia), an historic house in Spotsylvania County, Virginia
- La Vista Correctional Facility, prison in Pueblo County, Colorado
- La Vista High School, a high school in Fullerton, California
