= Tubal Furnace Archeological Site =

Archaeological site in Virginia, United States

- U.S. National Register of Historic Places
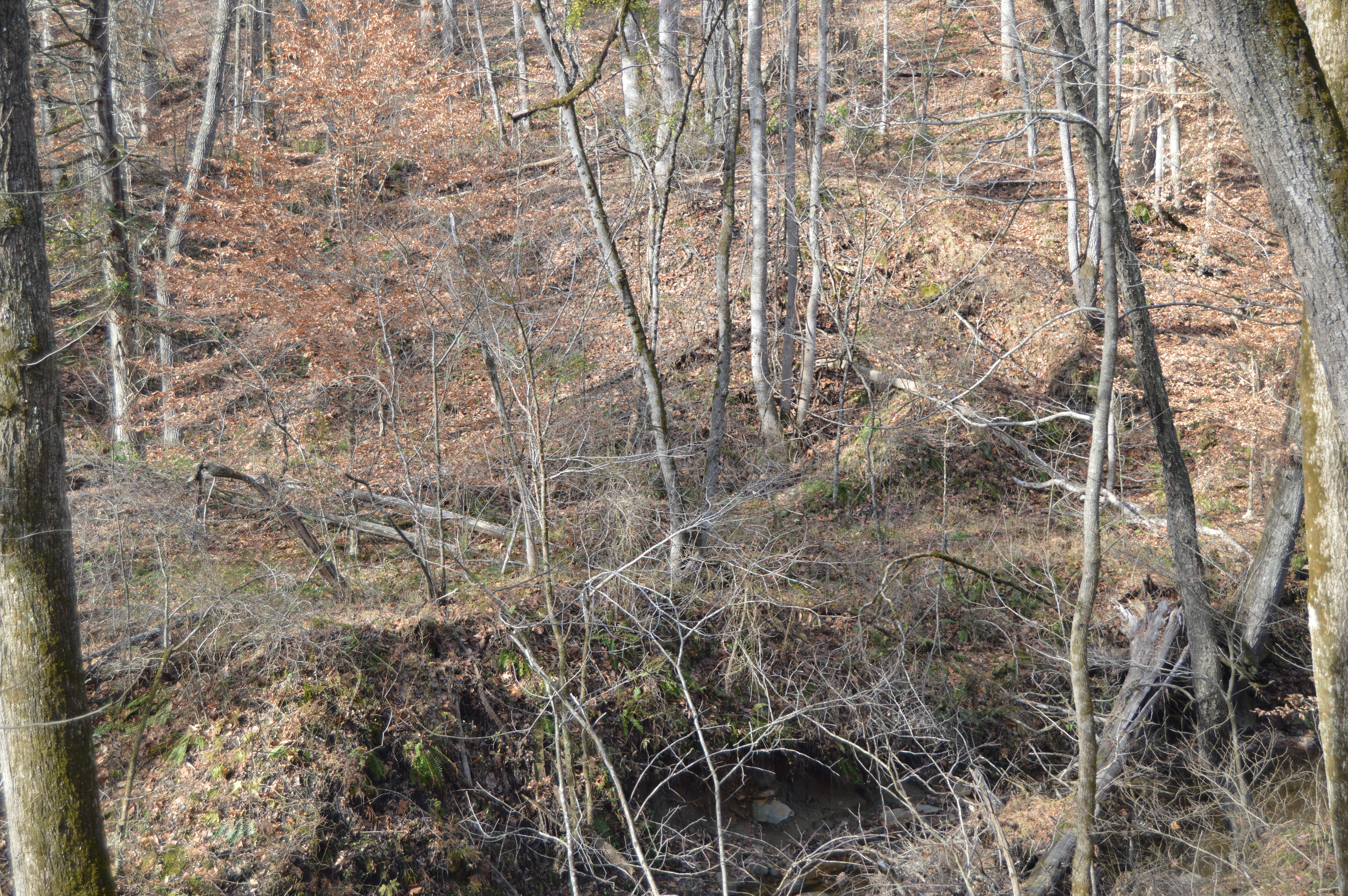
- Site overview
- Nearest city: Chancellor, Virginia
- Area: 12 acres (4.9 ha)
- Built: 1717
- Built by: Spotswood, Alexander
- NRHP reference No.: 82001825
- Added to NRHP: October 19, 1982

The Tubal Furnace Archeological Site is the site of an early 18th century industrial iron works in Spotsylvania County, Virginia, near Chancellor. Established by colonial Lieutenant Governor Alexander Spotswood in c. 1717, the site included a furnace and waterworks. It was operated, primarily by skilled slave labor, into the early 19th century.

The site was listed on the National Register of Historic Places in 1982.

== See also ==
- National Register of Historic Places listings in Spotsylvania County, Virginia
