= 16th Massachusetts Infantry Regiment =

16th Massachusetts Volunteer Infantry
- Active: June 29, 1861 to July 27, 1864
- Country: United States
- Allegiance: Union
- Branch: Infantry
- Engagements: Seven Days Battles; Battle of Glendale; Second Battle of Bull Run; Battle of Fredericksburg; Battle of Chancellorsville; Battle of Gettysburg; Bristoe Campaign; Mine Run Campaign; Battle of the Wilderness; Battle of Spotsylvania Court House; Battle of Harris Farm; Battle of Totopotomoy Creek; Battle of Cold Harbor; Siege of Petersburg; Battle of Jerusalem Plank Road

Commanders
- Colonel: Powell T. Wyman
- Colonel: Thomas R. Tannatt
- Lieutenant Colonel: Waldo Merriam

Insignia
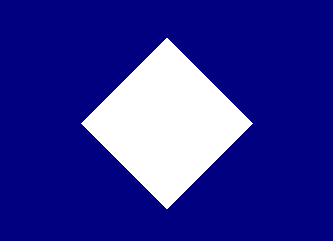
- III Corps (2nd Division) badge

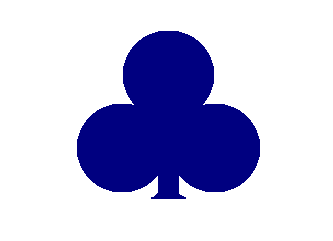
- II Corps (3rd Division) badge

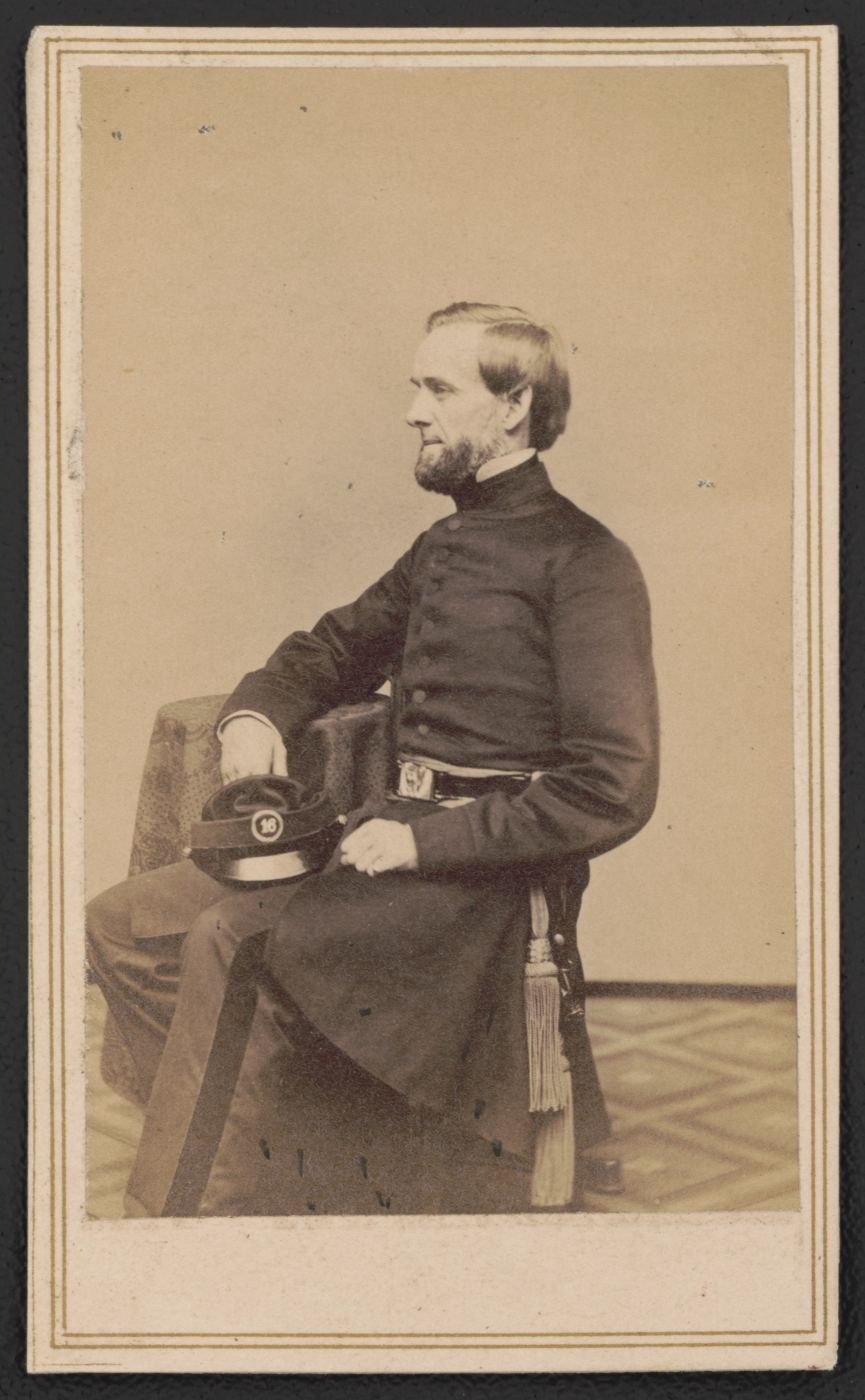
Chaplain Arthur B. Fuller of 16th Massachusetts Infantry Regiment. He was killed at Fredericksburg, Virginia, on December 11, 1862. From the Liljenquist Family Collection of Civil War Photographs, Prints and Photographs Division, Library of Congress

The 16th Massachusetts was an infantry regiment that served in the Union Army during the American Civil War formed of volunteers from the Commonwealth of Massachusetts.

== Service ==
The 16th Massachusetts was organized at Camp Cameron (Note: Camp Cameron was an American Civil War training camp that existed in 1861-1862 in North Cambridge, Massachusetts. It was probably named for Simon Cameron, Lincoln's first secretary of war. Other units that trained here included the 1st, 11th, 26th, and 28th regiments of Massachusetts infantry, and the 1st and 8th batteries of light artillery. It was located near Massachusetts Avenue, and was also known at one point as Camp Day after the family that owned the land. Cameron Avenue and Camp Street are named for the camp, and several nearby streets were named after battles.) in North Cambridge, Massachusetts, June 25, 1861. It mustered into federal service for a three-year enlistment on June 29, 1861 under the command of Colonel Powell Tremlett Wyman.

The 16th Massachusetts mustered out of service on July 27, 1864. Veterans and recruits were transferred to the 11th Massachusetts Infantry.

== Affiliations, battle honors, detailed service, and casualties ==
=== Organizational affiliation ===
Attached to:

- Fort Monroe, Department of Virginia, to May 1862.
- 1st Brigade, 1st Division, Department of Virginia, to June 1862.
- 1st Brigade, 2nd Division, III Corps, Army of the Potomac, to March 1864.
- 1st Brigade, 4th Division, II Corps, to May 1864.
- 3rd Brigade, 3rd Division, II Corps, to July 1864.

=== List of battles ===
The official list of battles in which the regiment bore a part:

- Seven Days Battles
- Battle of Glendale
- Second Battle of Bull Run
- Battle of Fredericksburg
- Battle of Chancellorsville
- Battle of Gettysburg
- Bristoe Campaign
- Mine Run Campaign
- Battle of the Wilderness
- Battle of Spotsylvania Court House
- Battle of Harris Farm
- Battle of Totopotomoy Creek
- Battle of Cold Harbor
- Siege of Petersburg
- Battle of Jerusalem Plank Road

=== Detailed service ===
==== 1861 ====
- Left Massachusetts for Old Point Comfort, Virginia, August 17.

==== 1862 ====
- Garrison duty at Fortress Monroe, Va., September 1, 1862 to May 8, 1862.
- Occupation of Norfolk May 10.
- Moved to Suffolk May 17,
- Joined the Army of the Potomac at Fair Oaks June 13.
- Nine-Mile Road, near Richmond, June 18.
- Seven Days before Richmond June 25-July 1.
  - Oak Grove, near Fair Oaks, June 25.
  - White Oak Swamp and Glendale June 30.
  - Malvern Hill July 1 and August 5.
- Duty at Harrison's Landing until August 15.
- Movement to Fortress Monroe, then to Centreville August 15–26.
- Bristoe Station, Kettle Run, August 27.
- Battles of Groveton August 29,
- Second Bull Run August 30,
- Chantilly September 1.
- Duty at Fort Lyon and at Fairfax Station, defenses of Washington, until October 30,
- Munson's Hill until November 2.
- At Fairfax Station until November 25.
- Operations on Orange & Alexandria Railroad November 10–12.
- Battle of Fredericksburg, December 12–15.
- Rappahannock Campaign December 1862 to June 1863.

==== 1863 ====
- "Mud March" January 20–24, 1863.
- At Falmouth until April 27.
- Chancellorsville Campaign April 27-May 6.
  - Battle of Chancellorsville May 1–5.
- Gettysburg Campaign June 11-July 24.
  - Battle of Gettysburg, July 1–3.
- Wapping Heights, Va, July 23.
- Bristoe Campaign October 9–22.
- Advance to the Rappahannock November 7–8.
- Kelly's Ford November 7.
- Mine Run Campaign November 26-December 2.
  - Payne's Farm November 27.

==== 1864 ====
- Demonstration on the Rapidan February 6–7, 1864.
- Duty near Brandy Station until May 1864.
- Overland Campaign May–June.
  - Battle of the Wilderness May 5–7,
  - Spotsylvania May 8–12,
  - Spotsylvania Court House May 12–21.
  - Assault on the Salient, Spotsylvania Court House, May 12.
  - Harris' Farm, Fredericksburg Road, May 19.
  - North Anna River May 23–26.
  - Ox Ford May 23–24.
  - On line of the Pamunkey May 26–28.
  - Totopotomoy May 28–31.
  - Cold Harbor June 1–12.
- Siege of Petersburg
  - Before Petersburg June 16–18.
  - First Battle of Petersburg June 16-July 11.
  - Jerusalem Plank Road June 22–23.
- Left front for muster out July 11.

== Casualties ==
The regiment lost a total of 245 men during service; 16 officers and 134 enlisted men killed or mortally wounded, 2 officers and 93 enlisted men died of disease.

== Commanders ==
- Colonel Powell Tremlett Wyman - killed in action at the Battle of Glendale
- Colonel Thomas R. Tannatt
- Lieutenant Colonel Waldo Merriam - commanded at the Battle of Gettysburg until wounded in action on July 2, 1863
- Major Gardner Banks - commanded at the Second Battle of Bull Run
- Captain Matthew Donovan - commanded the Battle of Gettysburg after Ltc Merriam was wounded

== See also ==
- List of Massachusetts Civil War units
- Massachusetts in the Civil War
- Dedham, Massachusetts in the American Civil War
- List of Massachusetts Civil War Units
- Massachusetts in the American Civil War
