= Kenmoor =

Kenmoor may refer to:

- Kenmoor, Missouri, U.S., unincorporated community
- Kenmoor Middle School, Landover, Maryland, U.S.

== See also ==
- Kenmore (disambiguation)
