= Bloomsbury Farm (Spotsylvania County, Virginia) =

Historic house in Virginia, United States

- Formerly listed on the U.S. National Register of Historic Places
- Virginia Landmarks Register
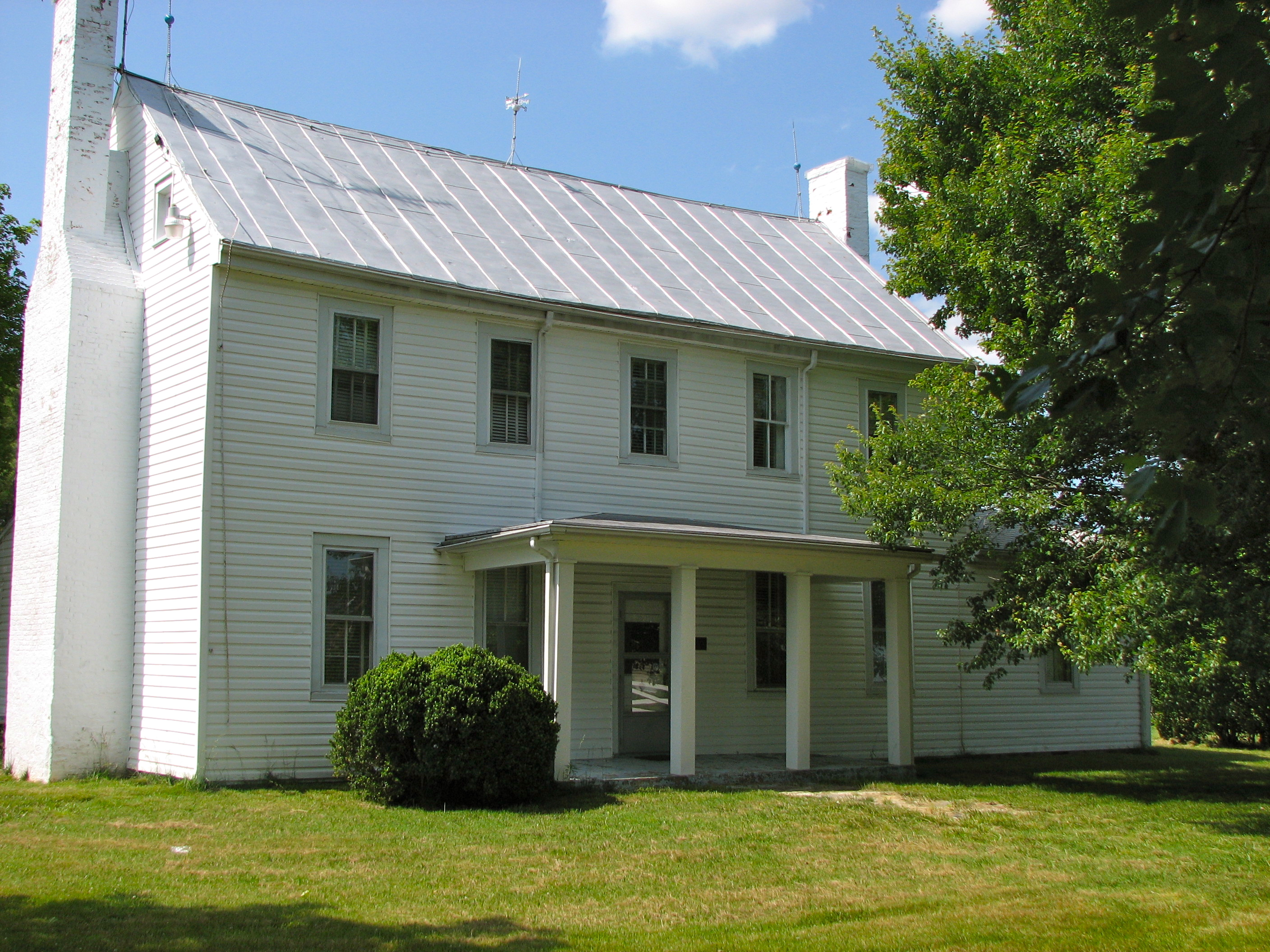
- Bloomsbury Farm (Spotsylvania County, Virginia)

- Location within Northern Virginia Location within Virginia Location within the United States
- Location: 9736 Courthouse Rd., Spotsylvania Courthouse, Virginia
- Coordinates: 38°14′7″N 77°33′58″W
- Area: 1.9 acres (0.77 ha)
- Built: 1785–1790
- Architectural style: Postmedieval English
- NRHP reference No.: 00000479
- VLR No.: 088-0001

Significant dates
- Added to NRHP: May 8, 2000
- Designated VLR: September 15, 1999
- Removed from NRHP: February 7, 2017
- Delisted VLR: September 15, 2016

Bloomsbury Farm (also known as Harris Farm) was an 18th-century timbered framed house, one of the oldest privately owned residences in Spotsylvania County, Virginia. The house was originally built by the Robinson family sometime between 1785 and 1790. It was architecturally significant for its eighteenth-century construction methods and decorative elements. The surrounding location is also significant as the site of the last engagement between Confederate and Union forces in the Battle of Spotsylvania Courthouse on May 19, 1864. Bloomsbury Farm was added to the National Register of Historic Places in May 2000. The house was demolished in December 2014 by Leonard Atkins, a nearby resident who purchased the property in November 2014 ostensibly to restore it. Atkins cited the building's supposedly poor condition and public safety as the reasons for the abrupt demolition, and he planned to replace the historic house with a new one commensurate in style and value with the modern houses in the surrounding development in which he lives. The farm was removed from the National Register in 2017.

== Design and construction ==
The house at Bloomsbury Farm began as a late 18th century, single-pile (only one room between the front façade and the rear walls), two-story house. In the early 1800s, the layout of the house was changed when a central hallway was created. Bloomsbury is of braced frame construction. The framing used for the house was hewn and pit-sawn beams and rafters. Wrought nails, hand-hammered from iron, were used as fasteners in the original building. The interior of the walls were filled with brick nogging. The house has two exterior-end chimneys of brick laid in Flemish bond. The foundation is fieldstone and uses dragon beams to support the east end of the first floor summer beam.

== History ==
Benjamin Robinson inherited the land on which Bloomsbury Farm is located and built the house sometime between the time he obtained the land and his death in 1790. The farm remained with his widow and then their descendants until 1854, when it was sold to Clement Harris. During the time that Harris owned the farm, it produced 4,500 pounds (2,000 kg) of tobacco along with wheat, Indian corn, and oats. The farm remained in the possession of the Harris family until 1883 when it was sold by Thomas Harris to Charles and Charlotte Phillips. Harris repurchased the land again in 1888. In 1913 the property was sold to a holding company and, in 1917, the farm was acquired by Robert Purvis. James McGee bought the land in 1927 and Bloomsbury became a dairy farm.

McGee and his family sold milk as the Bloomsbury Sanitary Dairy, selling raw Grade A milk in Fredericksburg, Virginia, until 1937 when they switched to selling bulk cans of milk. The family continued in the dairy business until 1966 when the Jersey cattle were sold.

== Battle of Harris Farm ==
On May 19, 1864, Bloomsbury Farm was the site of the Harris Farm Engagement (also called the Battle of Harris Farm), during which General Ewell's Confederate soldiers attacked Brig. Gen. Tyler's Union artillery division near the farm. This engagement, the last major action of the Battle of Spotsylvania Court House, ended when General Ewell's forces withdrew in the evening. During the fighting, the house was used as a field hospital. In the course of the battle, over 2000 soldiers were killed or wounded. In 1901, a monument dedicated to the memory of the fallen soldiers of the 1st Massachusetts Heavy Artillery was erected on the site.

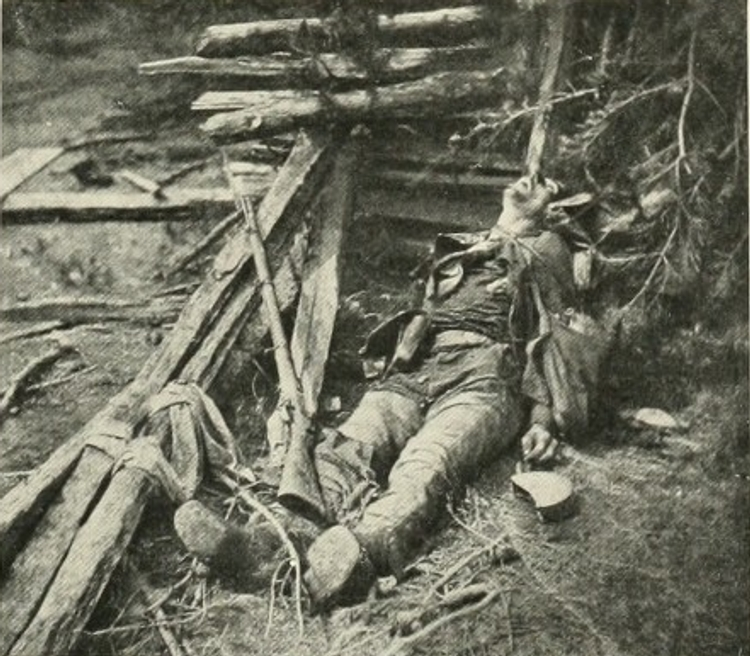
This unidentified, dead Confederate soldier of Ewell's Corps was killed during their attack at Alsop's farm. He was wounded in both the right knee and left shoulder, and probably died from loss of blood.

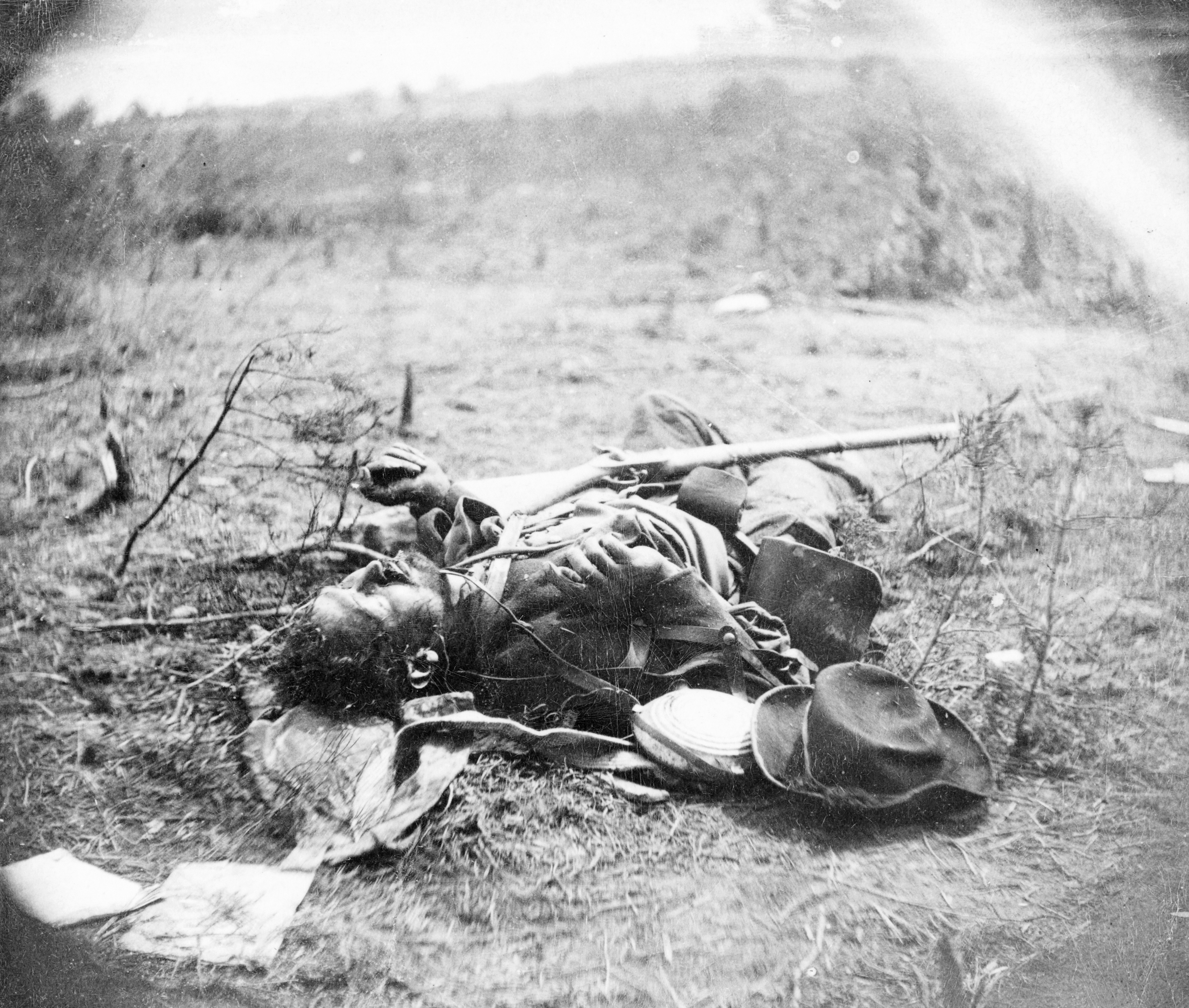
Confederate killed in Ewell's attack May 19, 1864, on the Alsop farm. This photograph was taken just to the right and in front of the preceding photograph.

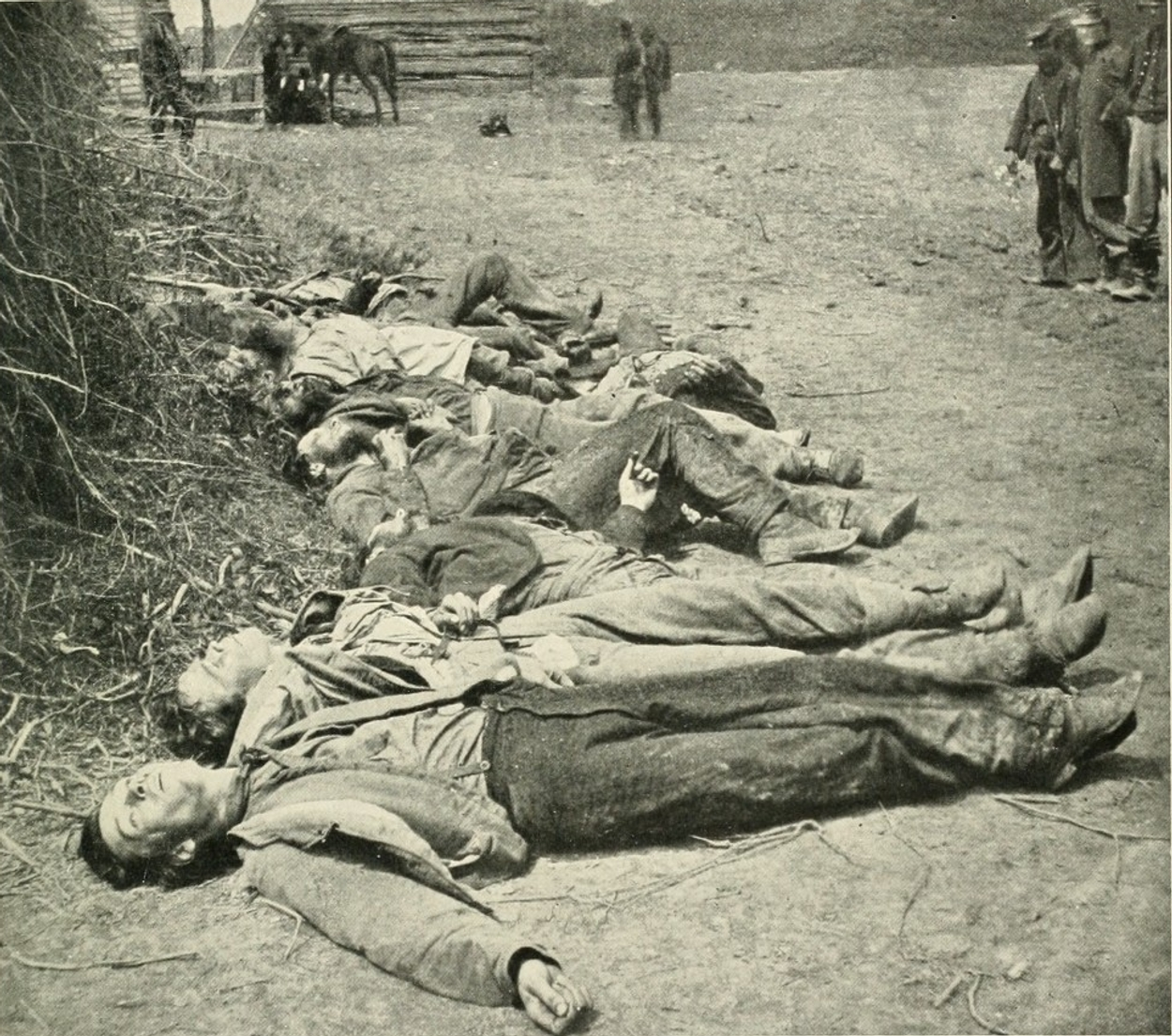
Confederate dead of General Ewell's Corps who attacked the Union lines on May 19 lined up for burial at the Alsop Farm.
