= Walter I. Lawson =

Tuskegee Airman pilot (1919–1952)

Captain Walter I. Lawson
- Walter I. Lawson
- Born: Walter Irving Lawson; November 7, 1919; Chancellor, Virginia, US
- Died: February 26, 1952 (aged 32); Omaha, Nebraska, US
- Burial place: Arlington National Cemetery
- Alma mater: Hampton Institute, now Hampton University
- Spouse: Cleo Hightower Lawson
- Relatives: Parents Robert and Lillian Lawson
- Military career
- Allegiance: United States of America
- Branch: United States Army Air Force
- Service years: 1942–1952
- Rank: Captain
- Nickname: Ghost
- Unit: 332nd Fighter Group
- Awards: Congressional Gold Medal

Walter Irving "Ghost" Lawson (November 7, 1919 – February 26, 1952) was a U.S. Army Air Force/U.S. Air Force officer and combat fighter pilot with the 332nd Fighter Group's 99th Pursuit Squadron, best known as the Tuskegee Airmen or "Red Tails". He was one of 1,007 documented Tuskegee Airmen Pilots.

Lawson was one of America's first thirty-four African American combat fighter pilots.

== Early life ==
Lawson was born on November 7, 1919, in Chancellor, Virginia, Spotsylvania County. He was the son of Robert Nelson Lawson (July 2, 1886 - December 12, 1950), pastor of Spotsylvania County's First Mt. Olive Baptist Church, and Lillian M. Redmond Lawson (14 February 14, 1886 - April 3, 1977), a teacher and alumni of Hampton Institute (now Hampton University) and Virginia State College ((now Virginia State University. He had two siblings: brother Robert D. Lawson and Prentiss A. Lawson. He was raised in Chancellor, Virginia.

Prior to his training at the Tuskegee Institute, Lawson attended Hampton Institute, where he studied as an automobile mechanic.

He was married to Cleo Hightower Lawson until his death.

== Military career ==
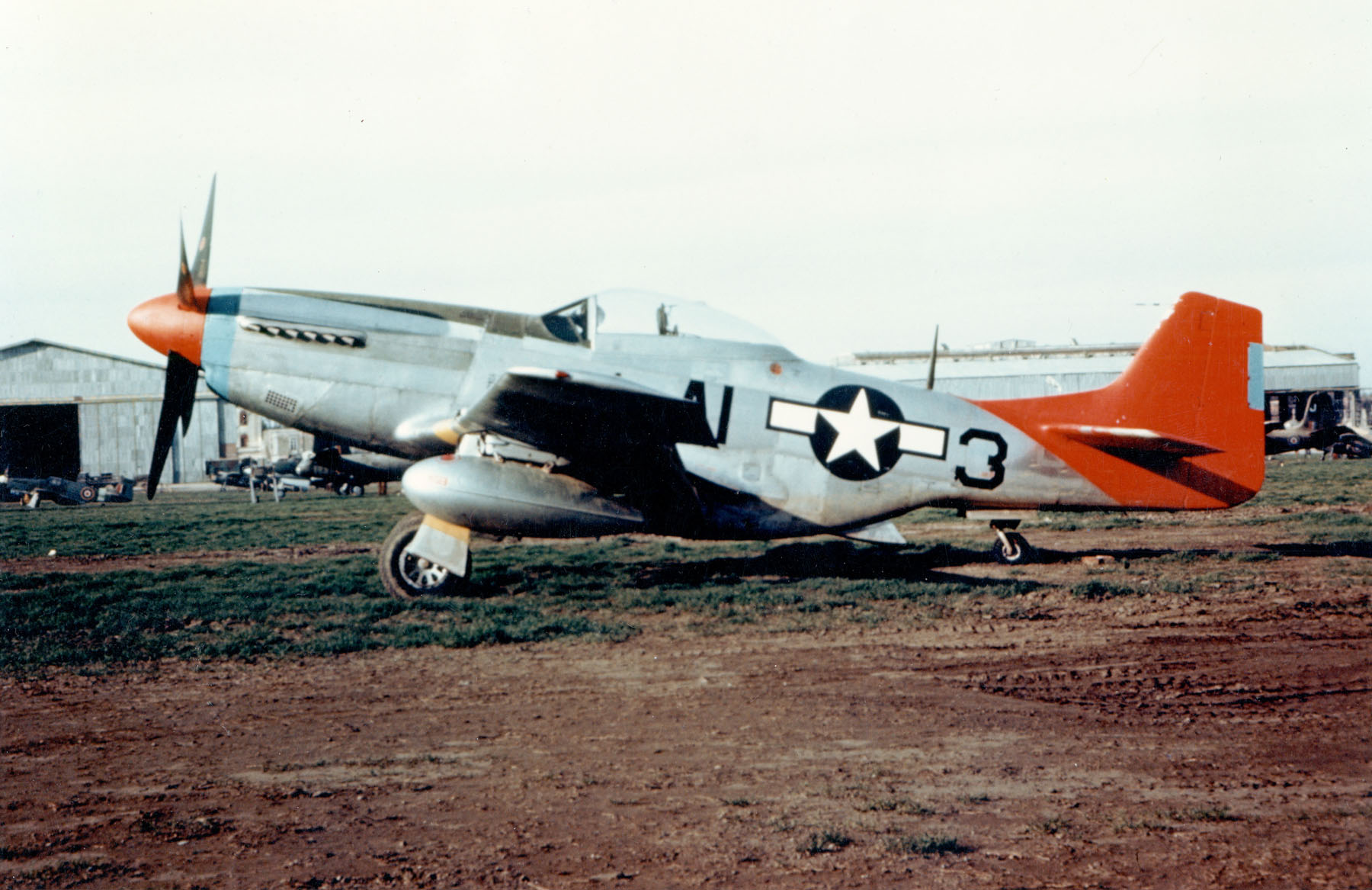
The Tuskegee Airmen's aircraft had distinctive markings that led to the name, "Red Tails." (Note: The red markings that distinguished the Tuskegee Airmen included red bands on the noses of P-51s as well as a red rudder; their P-51B and D Mustangs flew with similar color schemes, with red propeller spinners, yellow wing bands and all-red tail surfaces.)

In 1942, he enrolled in the fourth class of cadets in the 99 Pursuit Squadron, at Tuskegee Institute; In June, when set to graduate in one month, he was in a plane that crashed during a training exercise; the pilot, Robert Dawson, died after striking a transmission line, but Lawson survived. It was the first fatal accident at the flying school. On August 5, he graduated from the Tuskegee Advanced Pilot Cadet program, as a member of the fifth-ever Cadet Class Single Engine Section SE-42-G, receiving his wings and commission as a 2nd Lieutenant. His service number was 0–791783. Lawson was one of America's first thirty-four African American combat fighter pilots. The U.S. Army Air Corps assigned him to the 332nd Fighter Group's 99th Fighter Squadron. Lawson was part of the first group of 99th Fighter Squadron pilots to be deployed overseas. Lawson flew missions over Sicily and Italy in 1943.

After World War II, Lawson served in Korea and Tokyo, Japan. In 1949, he was in the 3380th Technical Training Group in Kessler Field, Mississippi. At the time of his death in 1952, Lawson held the rank of Captain.

== Awards ==
- Congressional Gold Medal awarded to the Tuskegee Airmen in 2006.

== Death ==
On February 25, 1952, Lawson and a crew of fellow 343rd Strategic Reconnaissance Squadron members in a Boeing RB-50G Superfortress departed Hickam Field in Honolulu, Hawaii, after two months stationed in Tokyo, Japan. The plane was stationed at Ramey Air Force Base, in Puerto Rico.

On the morning of February 26, 1952, at 02:00, their aircraft, piloted by Zane G. Hall, hit a mound of dirt on the runaway of Offutt Field in Omaha, Nebraska, causing the plane to skid and explode. Twelve crew members were injured, five crew members, including Lawson, were killed instantly.

On March 3, 1952, Lawson was interred at Arlington National Cemetery, Section 3, Site 1383, survived by his wife Cleo, son Walter, and daughters Sandra and Carmelita. In 1994, his wife was buried with him.

Years later, Lawson's family spoke with crash survivor Stamps to hear the details of the 1952 crash, allowing the family to grief and get closure on Lawson's death.

== See also ==
- List of Tuskegee Airmen Cadet Pilot Graduation Classes
- List of Tuskegee Airmen
- Military history of African Americans
- Dogfights (TV series)
- Executive Order 9981 – 1948 order by President Truman
- The Tuskegee Airmen (movie) – 1995 American television film
