= La Vue (Spotsylvania County, Virginia) =

Historic house in Virginia, United States

- U.S. National Register of Historic Places
- Virginia Landmarks Register
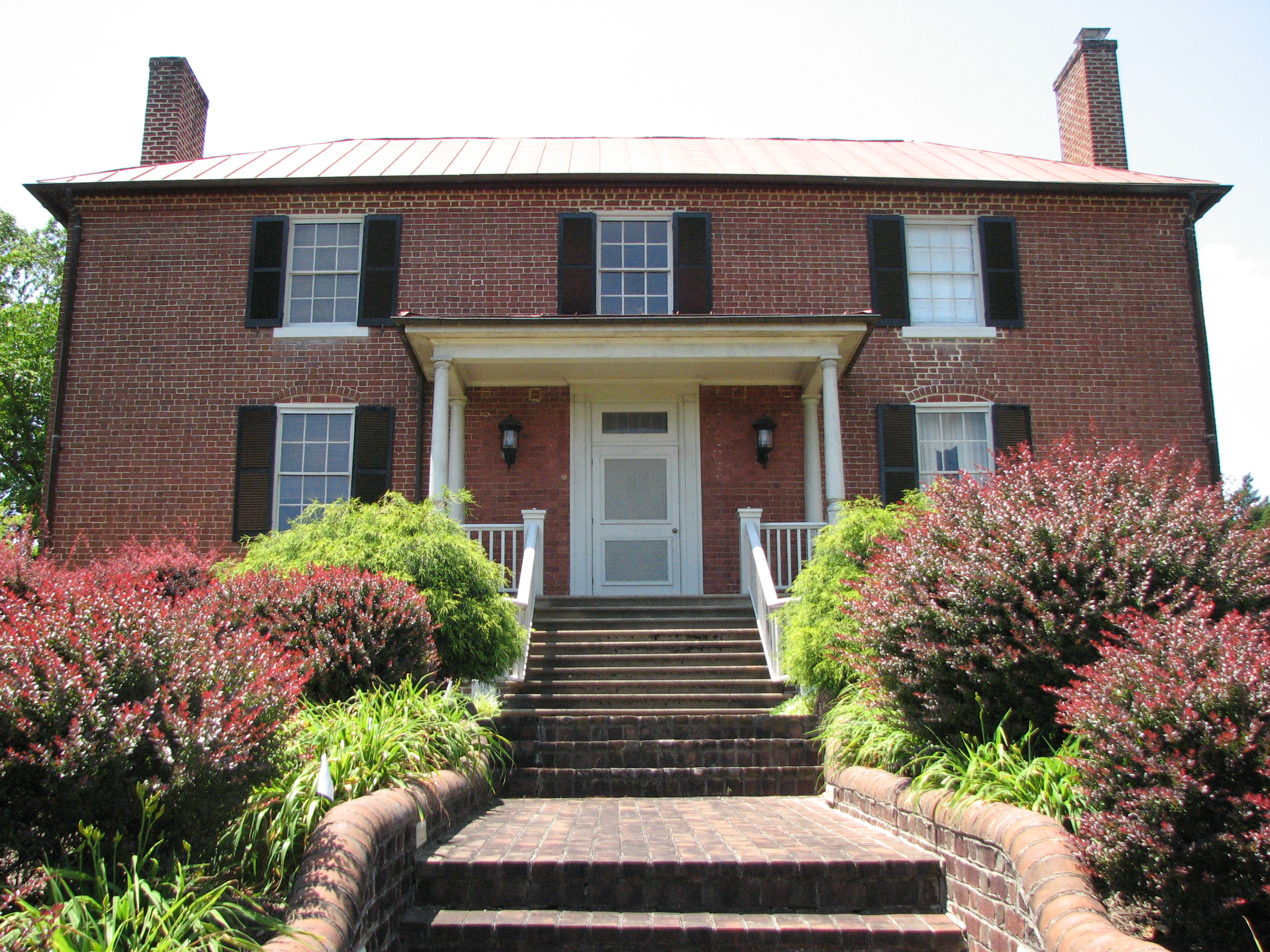
- La Vue (Spotsylvania County, Virginia)

- Location within Northern Virginia Location within Virginia Location within the United States
- Location: US 17 Bypass, south side at the junction with the Richmond, Fredericksburg and Potomac Railroad tracks, near Fredericksburg, Virginia
- Coordinates: 38°13′11″N 77°26′34″W
- Area: 60 acres (24 ha)
- Built: 1848
- Architectural style: Greek Revival
- NRHP reference No.: 93001459
- VLR No.: 088-0039

Significant dates
- Added to NRHP: January 11, 1994
- Designated VLR: October 20, 1993

La Vue (formerly known as Prospect Vue) is an historic home located in Spotsylvania County, Virginia. The home was built in 1848 by George Alsop for his son, John. La View was added to the National Register of Historic Places in January 1994.

The two-story, ell-shaped house sits on top of a steep hill so as to provide a view of the surrounding fields.
