= Andrews Tavern (Spotsylvania County, Virginia) =

Historic building in Virginia, US

- U.S. National Register of Historic Places
- Virginia Landmarks Register
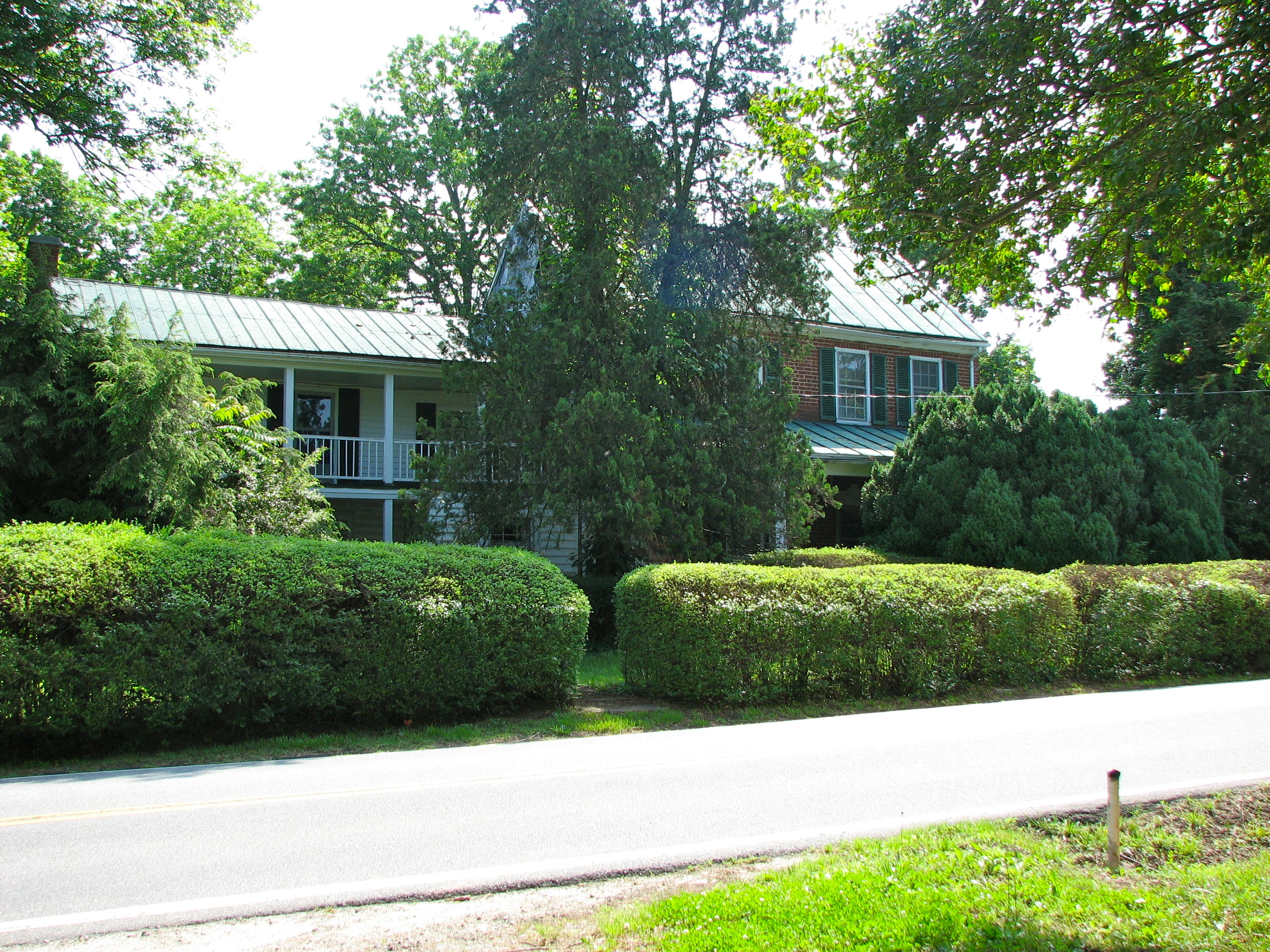
- Andrews Tavern (Spotsylvania County, Virginia)

- Location within Northern Virginia Location within Virginia Location within the United States
- Location: 2.6 miles (4.2 km) northeast of Glenora on VA 601, near Glenora, Virginia
- Coordinates: 38°7′17″N 77°46′13″W
- Area: 95 acres (38 ha)
- Built: 1815
- Architectural style: Federal
- NRHP reference No.: 76002121
- VLR No.: 088-0136

Significant dates
- Added to NRHP: July 30, 1976
- Designated VLR: April 20, 1976

Andrews Tavern is an historic building located in Spotsylvania County, Virginia. The original building was constructed for Samuel Andrews in 1815. Around 1848, a frame wing was added to the brick structure for a tavern. Though the wing was added to the original residence, there is no interior connection between the two. The tavern is an example of Federal provincial architecture.

In 1778, the county seat of Spotsylvania County was moved to Andrews Tavern area which was a central location in the county. The county seat remained at Andrews Tavern until it was moved to its present location at Spotsylvania Court House in 1839.

Since the construction of the building, it has served a number of purposes including United States Post Office (1842–1862) and, during the American Civil War, Confederate post office (1862–1865). During his ownership of the building, Samuel Andrews was postmaster for the governments of both the Confederate States of America and the United States. The building has also served as a school and a polling place. The location of the tavern, near the intersection of two major roads, made it a central social and political gathering place. Both the Whigs and the Democrats promoted their parties on election days in the 1840s with parades, banners, and free whiskey for voters.

In 1885, the building once again housed a post office. As of 1999, Andrews Tavern was a private residence.

The property has been designated as a Virginia Historic Landmark and was added to the National Register of Historic Places in July 1976.
