= Prospect Hill (Spotsylvania County, Virginia) =

Historic house in Virginia, United States

- U.S. National Register of Historic Places
- Virginia Landmarks Register
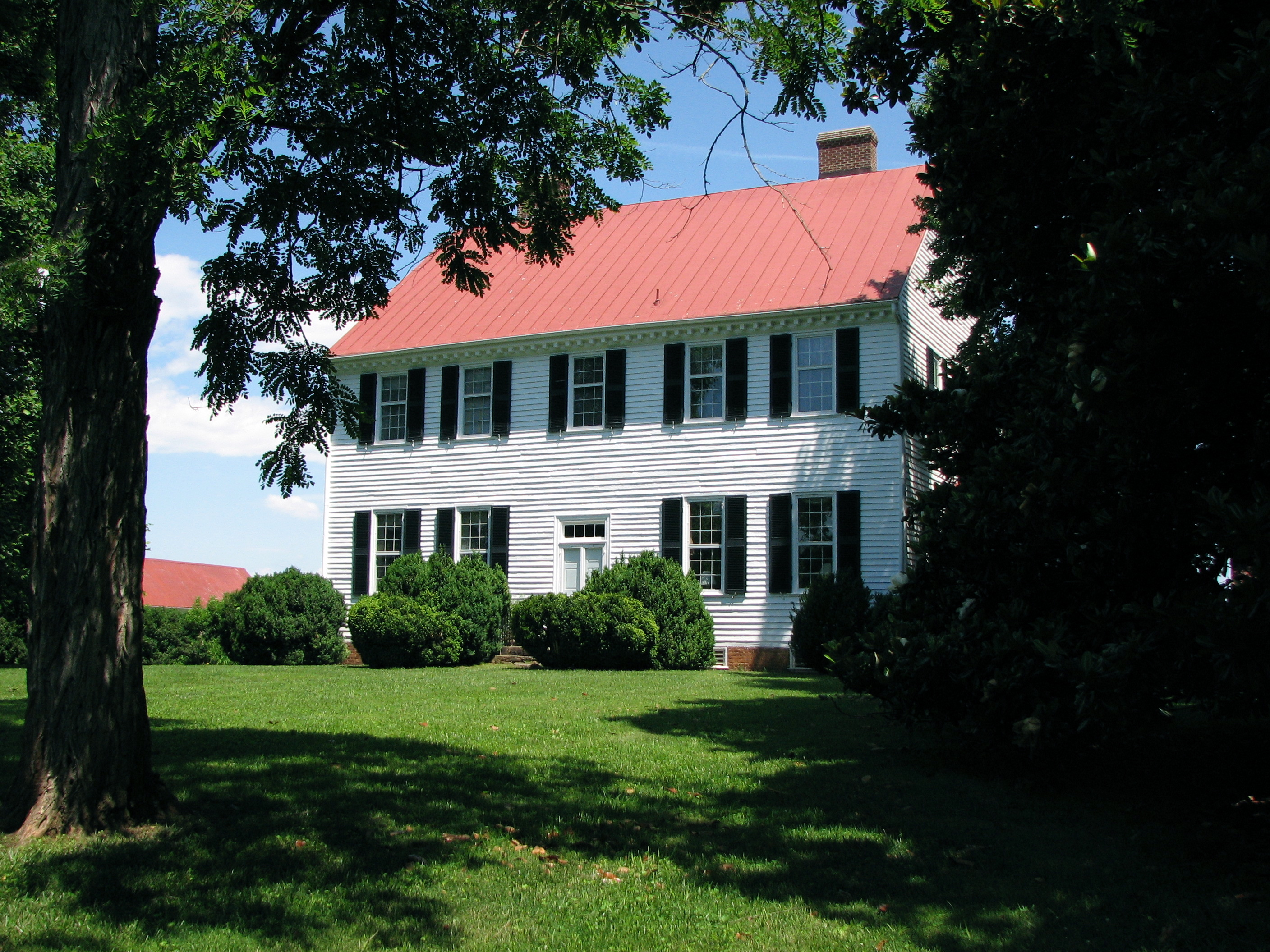
- The house at Prospect Hill - Now the Littlepage Inn - Spotsylvania County, Virginia

- Location within Northern Virginia Location within Virginia Location within the United States
- Location: 1507 Monrovia Rd. (VA 612), near Mineral, Virginia
- Coordinates: 38°7′34″N 77°52′41″W
- Area: 15 acres (6.1 ha)
- Built: 1811
- Architectural style: Georgian
- NRHP reference No.: 82004597
- VLR No.: 088-0056

Significant dates
- Added to NRHP: September 9, 1982
- Designated VLR: June 15, 1982; December 11, 1991

Prospect Hill (also known as the Littlepage Inn) is a plantation house in Spotsylvania County, Virginia. The house was built between 1811 and 1812 by Spotswood Dabney Crenshaw for Waller Holladay. Holladay was elected to several local political positions and also served in the Virginia General Assembly. Waller purchased land around Prospect Hill beginning in 1803 using an inheritance from his half-brother, General Lewis Littlepage. One of the original outbuildings housed the first post office in Spotsylvania in 1809.

Holladay and his wife, Huldah, raised 13 children at Prospect hill. One of their sons, James Holladay, was captured at the Battle of Five Forks during the American Civil War - just days before the Confederate surrender at Appomattox Court House. When he was released, James returned to the plantation and restored it to operation. In the 1880s he added a porch surrounding the first floor. This was the only addition to Prospect Hill until 1991.

Prospect Hill underwent restoration between 1991 and 1996. The restoration was done by Holladay family members - descendants of Waller and Huldah Holladay.

A number of buildings are part of the plantation. In addition to the manor house, seven dependencies which have been restored, the granary and the plantation office.
