= USS Kenmore =

USS Kenmore may refer to the following ships of the United States Navy:

- USS Kenmore (AP-62), was converted to a hospital ship and renamed Refuge on 2 September 1943 then sold for scrap, on 2 February 1948
- USS Kenmore (AK-221), and earlier AP-162, was acquired by the US Navy and commissioned on 14 November 1943 and returned to her owner on 1 February 1946
