= Spotsylvania Court House Historic District =

Historic district in Virginia, United States

- U.S. National Register of Historic Places
- U.S. Historic district
- Virginia Landmarks Register
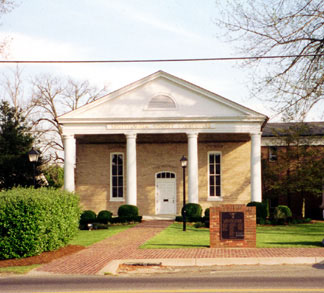
- Spotsylvania County Courthouse (Built 1839-1840), September 1998

- Location within Northern Virginia Location within Virginia Location within the United States
- Location: VA 208, Spotsylvania, Virginia
- Coordinates: 38°12′12″N 77°35′06″W
- Area: 101 acres (41 ha)
- Architect: Multiple
- Architectural style: Greek Revival, Federal, Victorian
- NRHP reference No.: 83003317
- VLR No.: 088-0142

Significant dates
- Added to NRHP: September 8, 1983
- Designated VLR: January 18, 1983

Spotsylvania Court House Historic District is a national historic district located at Spotsylvania, Spotsylvania County, Virginia. The district includes 24 contributing buildings in the historic core of Spotsylvania. The principal building is the Spotsylvania Court House, a two-story Roman Revival style brick building built in 1839-1840 and extensively remodeled in 1901. The front facade features a tetrastyle portico in the Tuscan order. Associated with the courthouse is a late 18th-century jail and office and storage buildings erected in the 1930s. Other notable buildings include the Spottswood Inn (c. 1800), Berea Church (1856), Christ Church (1841), Dabney Farm, J.P.H. Crismond House (c. 1904), Harris House, and Cary Crismond House.

It was listed on the National Register of Historic Places in 1983.
