= Peter E. Kenmore =

American entomologist

Peter E. Kenmore is an American agricultural entomologist at the Food and Agriculture Organization (FAO) of the United Nations.

== Awards ==
- 1994 MacArthur Fellows Program

== Works ==
- "Impact of IPM Programs on Asian Agriculture", Integrated Pest Management: Dissemination and Impact, Editors Rajinder Peshin, Ashok K. Dhawan, Springer, 2009, ISBN 978-1-4020-8989-3
