= Harris Farm Engagement =

Coordinates: 38°13.774′N 77°33.758′W

- Part of the American Civil War
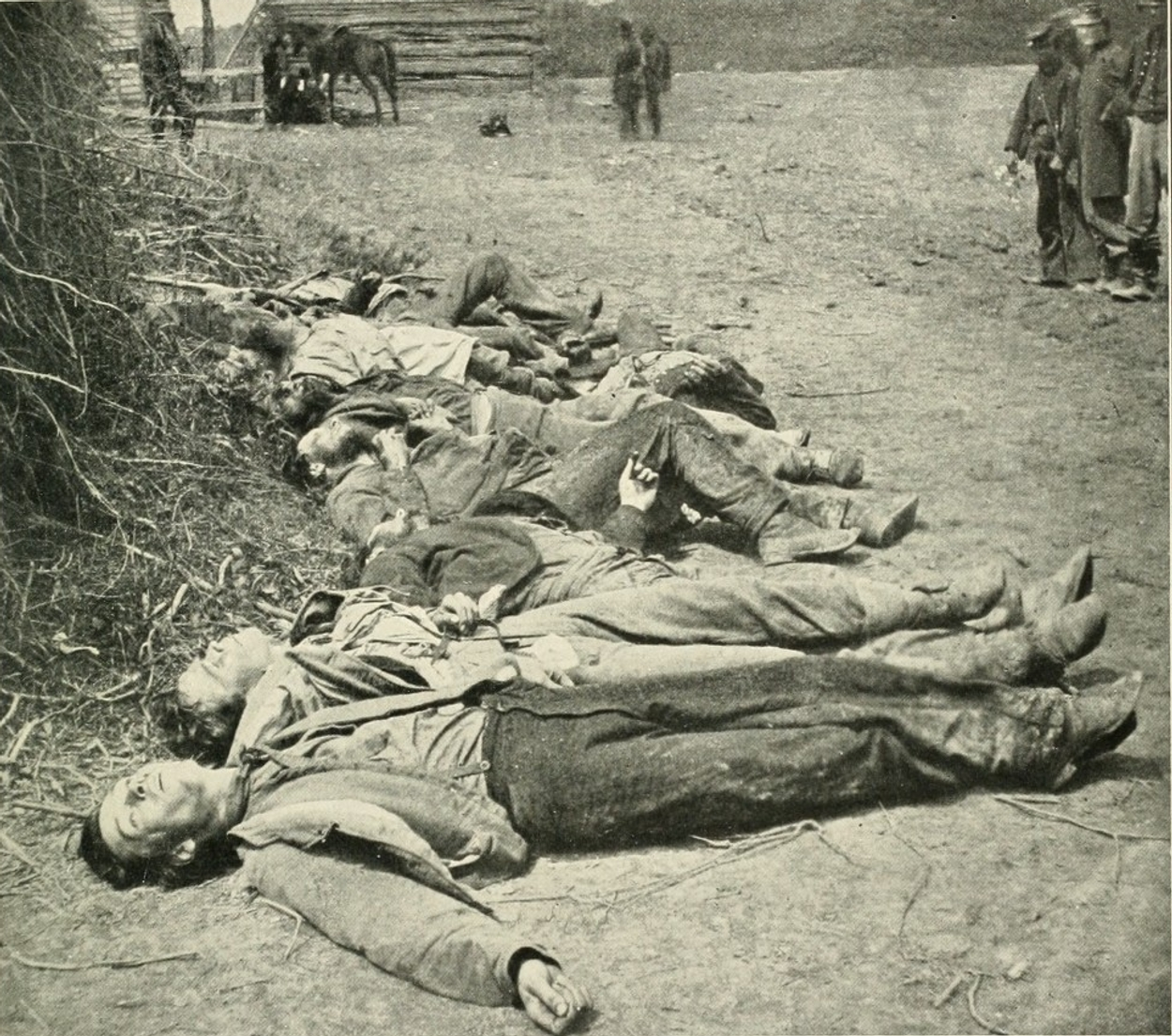
- Confederate dead lined up for burial at the Alsop farm May 19, 1864
| Date | May 19, 1864 |
| Location | Spotsylvania County, Virginia |
| Result | Union victory |

Belligerents
| United States (Union) | (Confederate States of America) CSA (Confederacy) |

Commanders and leaders
| Winfield S. Hancock | Richard S. Ewell |

Units involved
| II Corps | Second Corps |

Strength
| 6,642 | 2,718 |

Casualties and losses
| 694; 204 killed 448 wounded 42 captured/missing | 904; 136 killed 724 wounded 44 captured/missing |

The Harris Farm Engagement was a military engagement between the Union Army and the Confederate States Army. The Harris Farm Engagement was a part of the Battle of Spotsylvania Courthouse. The battle was led by Union Major General Winfield S. Hancock and Confederate general Richard S. Ewell. The battle was caused when the Union commander, Lt. Gen. Ulysses S. Grant ordered Hancock's Union II Corps to trap Confederate soldiers between Richmond and Fredericksburg. Before General Hancock could trap the Confederate soldiers, Confederate General Robert E. Lee ordered Lieutenant General Richard S. Ewell, in command of the Confederate Second Corps to ambush General Hancock's troops at the Harris Farm (also known as Bloomsbury Farm).

== Background ==
The Harris Farm Engagement was a part of the Battle of Spotsylvania Courthouse. At the battle of Spotsylvania Courthouse, Gen. Ulysses S. Grant ordered Gen. Winfield S. Hancock's Federal II Corps to trap receding Confederate troops who were heading to Fredericksburg. Unbeknownst to General Grant, Confederate Gen. Robert E. Lee heard of this and ordered Richard S. Ewell and the rest of the surviving Confederate Second Corps of the Army of Northern Virginia to ambush Hancock's troops at the Harris Farm. Ewell made camp near the Harris Farm and waited for the Hancock's troops to come near.

== Battle ==
When Hancock's troops came into view Ewell had his men fire at them. Ewell then ordered a charge on Hancock's troops. Early in the battle Ewell had the upper hand until Hancock's superior numbers soon gained the control. Both sides quickly began taking heavy casualties, and Ewell began falling back. Grant, who was observing the battle, ordered Hancock to pursue the remaining troops. The battle continued until General Lee, who was also observing the battle, thought this engagement was about to turn into a battle of itself. Lee ordered his troops to disengage and head to Richmond. Grant and Hancock claimed victory, as they had forced a retreat of the enemy and officially ended the Battle of Spotsylvania Courthouse.

== Aftermath ==
The Harris Farm Engagement claimed 1,598 casualties on both sides. The engagement was the end of the long Battle of the Spotsylvania Courthouse.

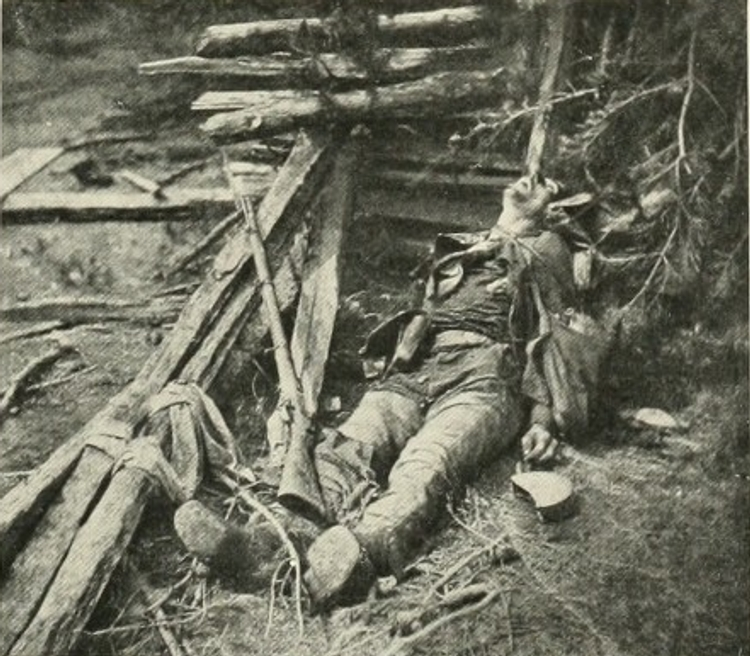
This unidentified, dead Confederate soldier of Ewell's Corps was killed during their attack at Alsop's farm. He was wounded in both the right knee and left shoulder, and probably died from loss of blood.

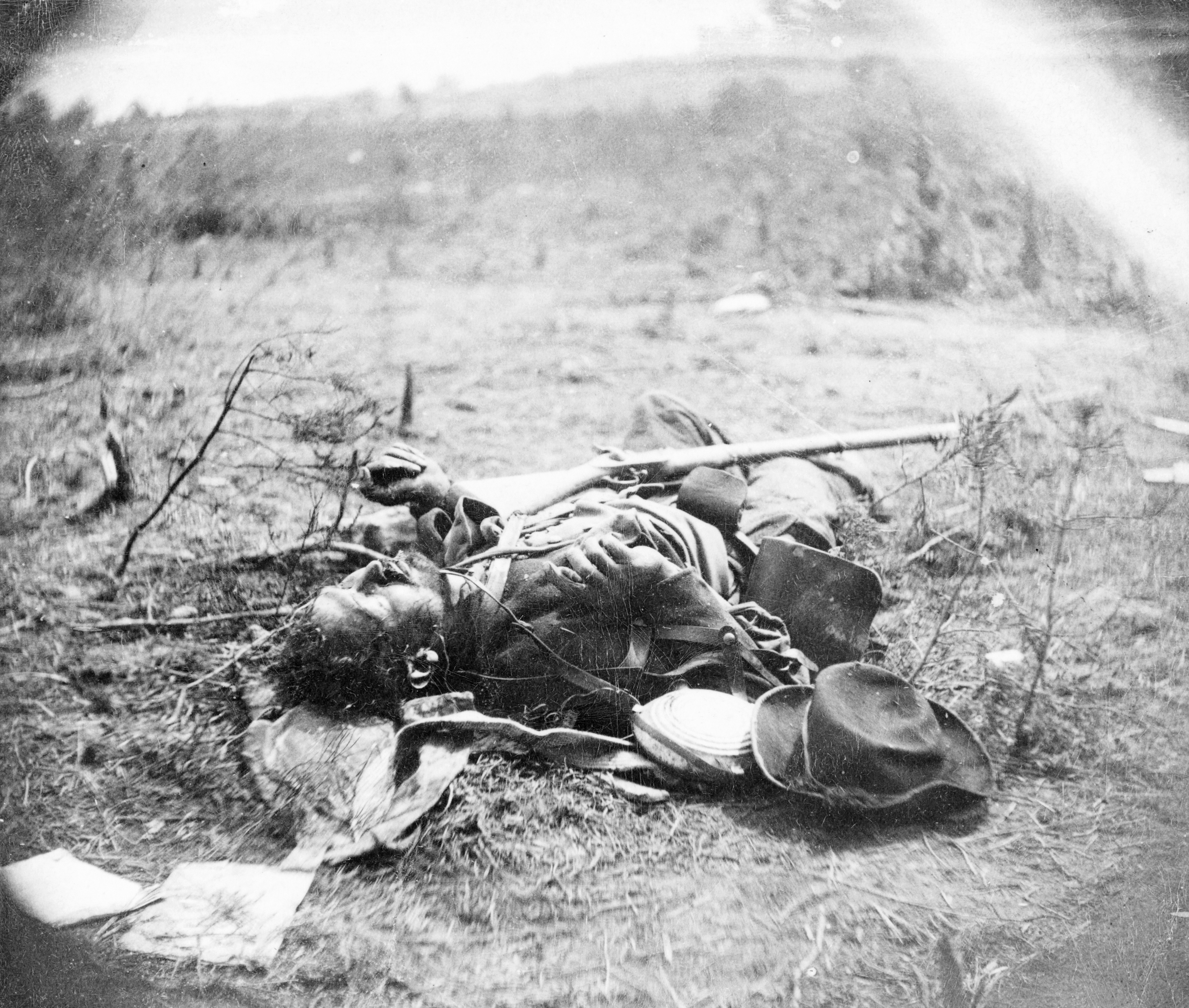
Confederate killed in Ewell's attack May 19, 1864, on the Alsop farm.

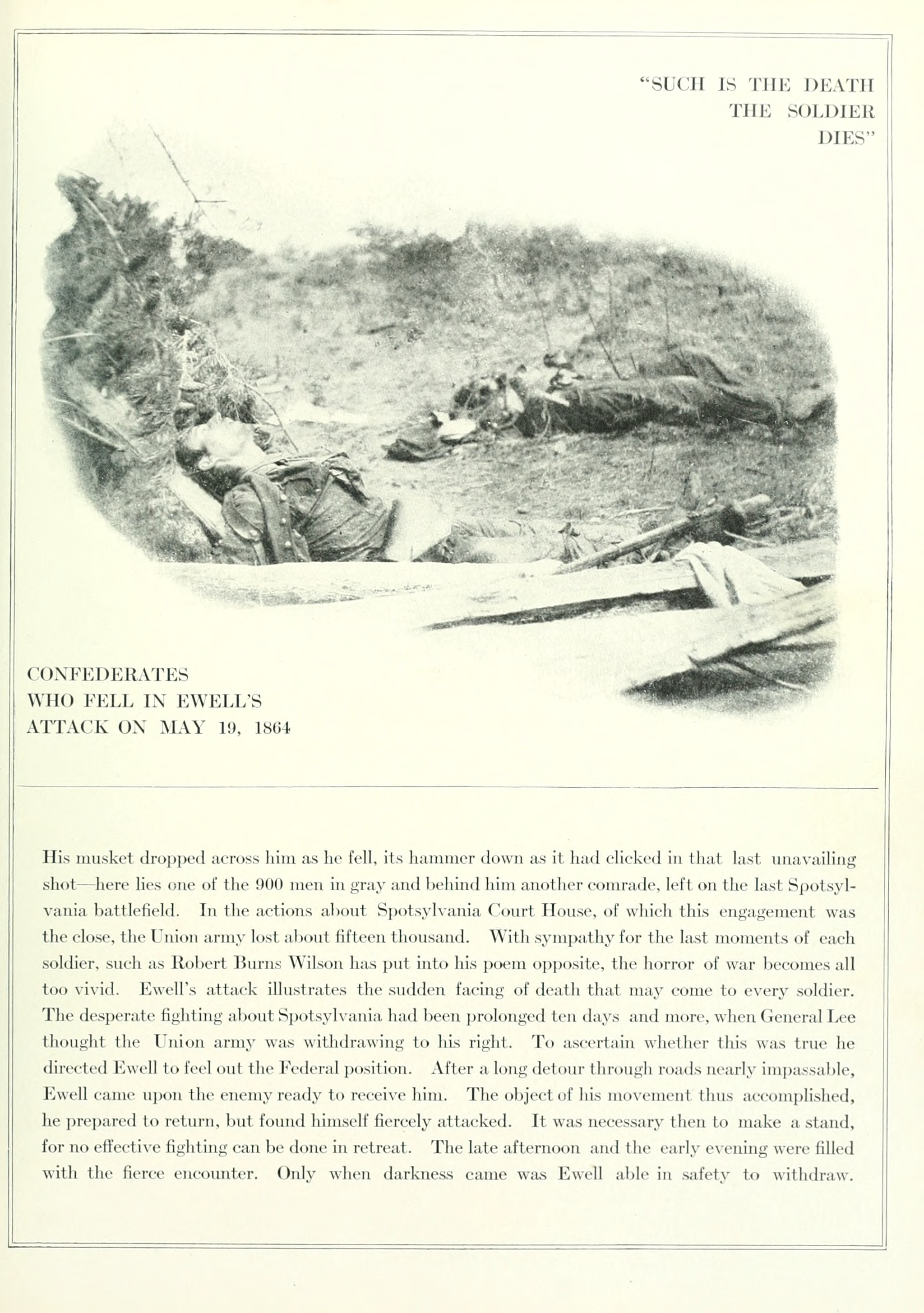
Photograph taken on the Alsop farm showing the positions of the casualties in the two preceding photographs

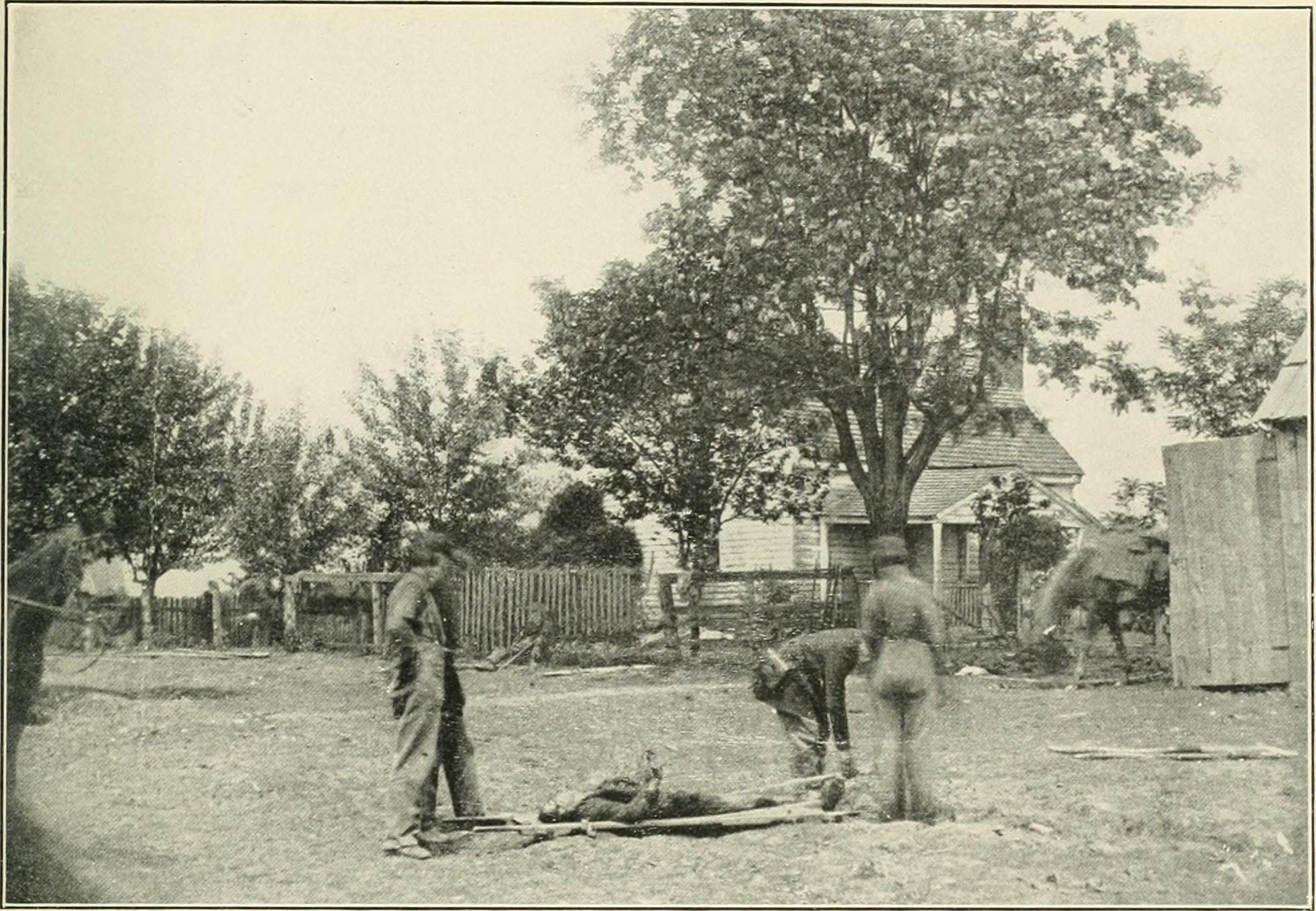
A dead Confederate soldier of General Ewell's Corps on a stretcher in front of the Alsop Farm House

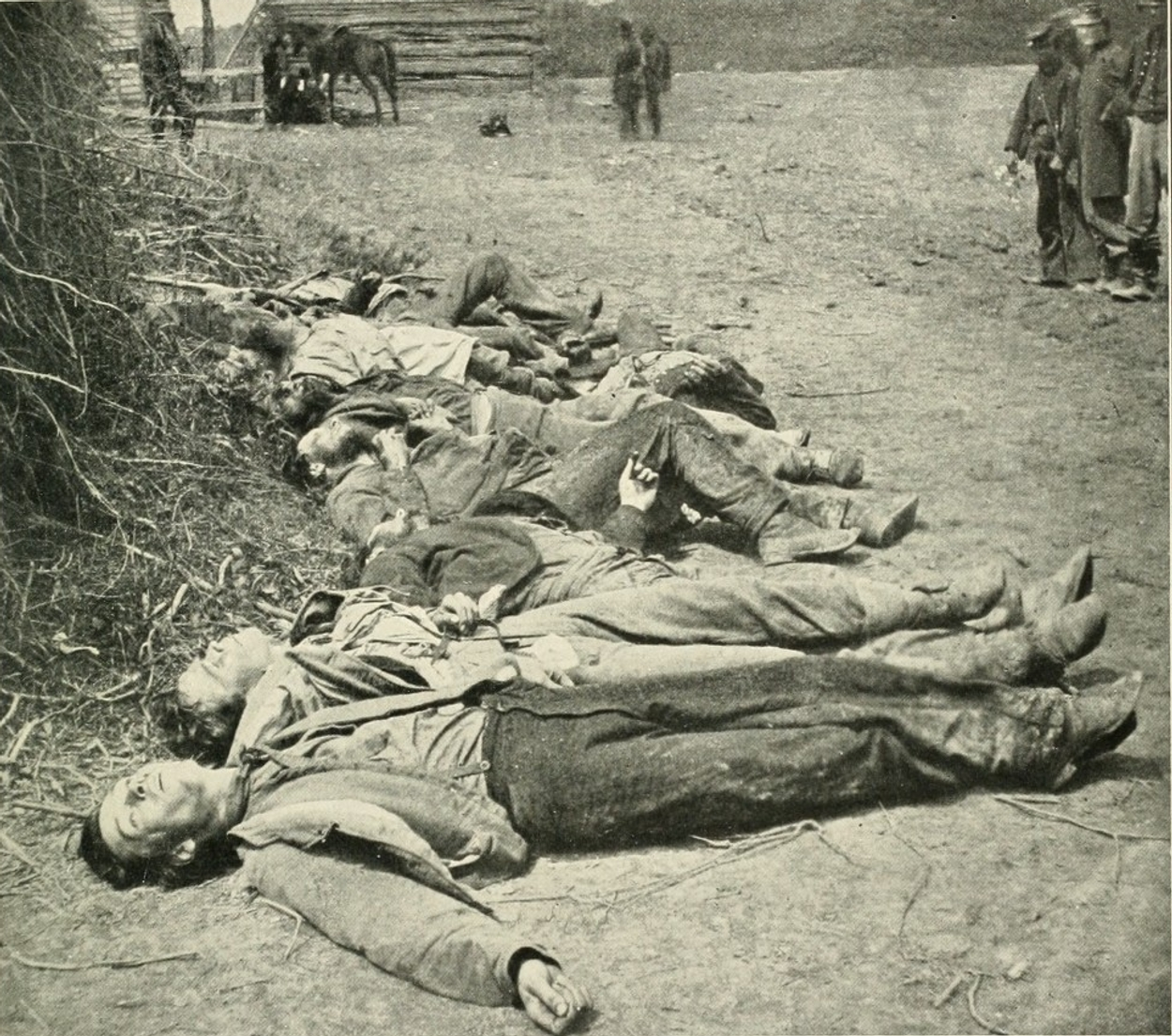
Confederate dead of General Ewell's Corps who attacked the Union lines on May 19 lined up for burial at the Alsop Farm.

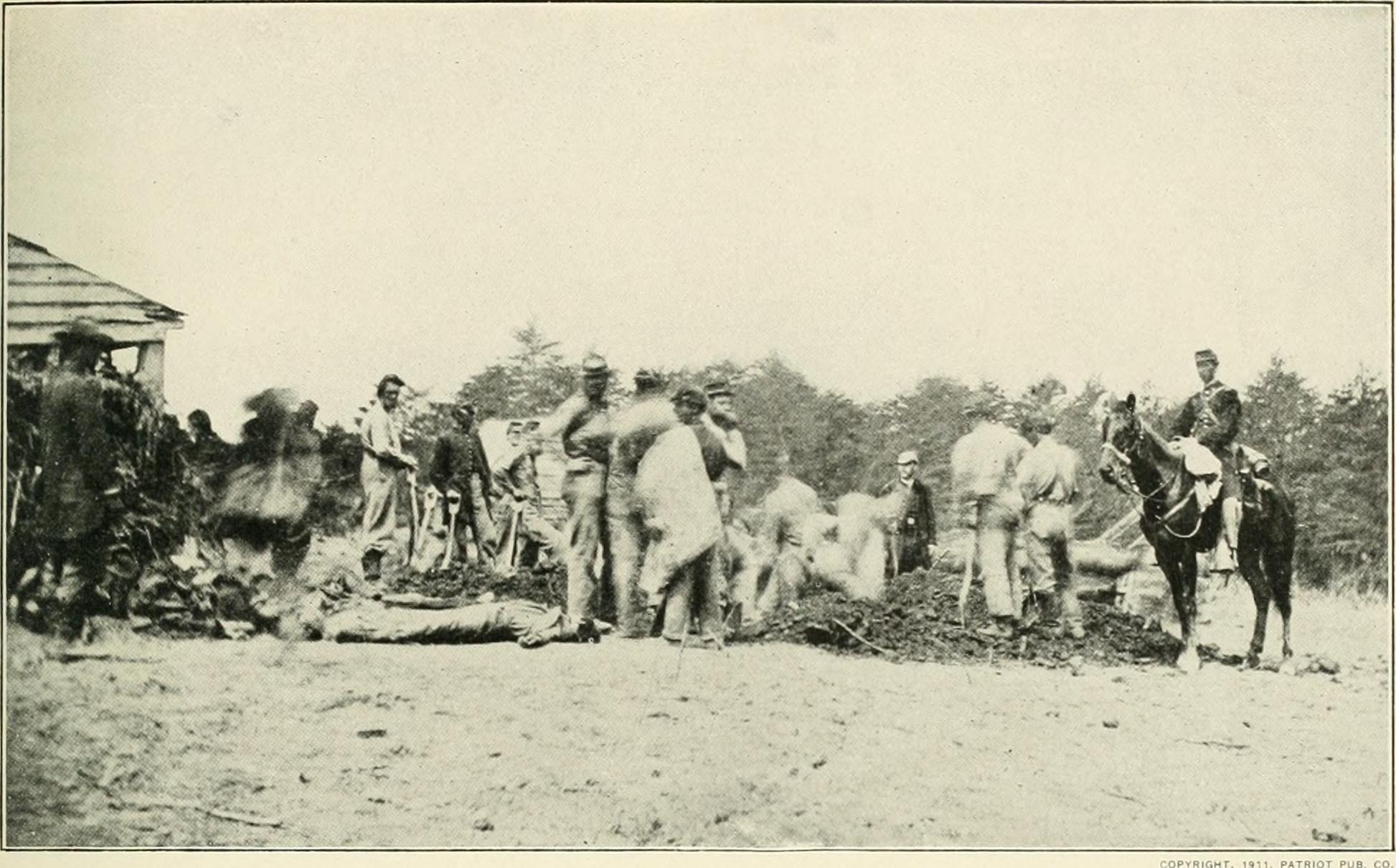
The 1st Massachusetts Heavy Artillery Regiment bury dead Confederates at the Alsop Farm May 19, 1864
