= La Vista (Spotsylvania County, Virginia) =

Historic house in Virginia, United States

- U.S. National Register of Historic Places
- Virginia Landmarks Register
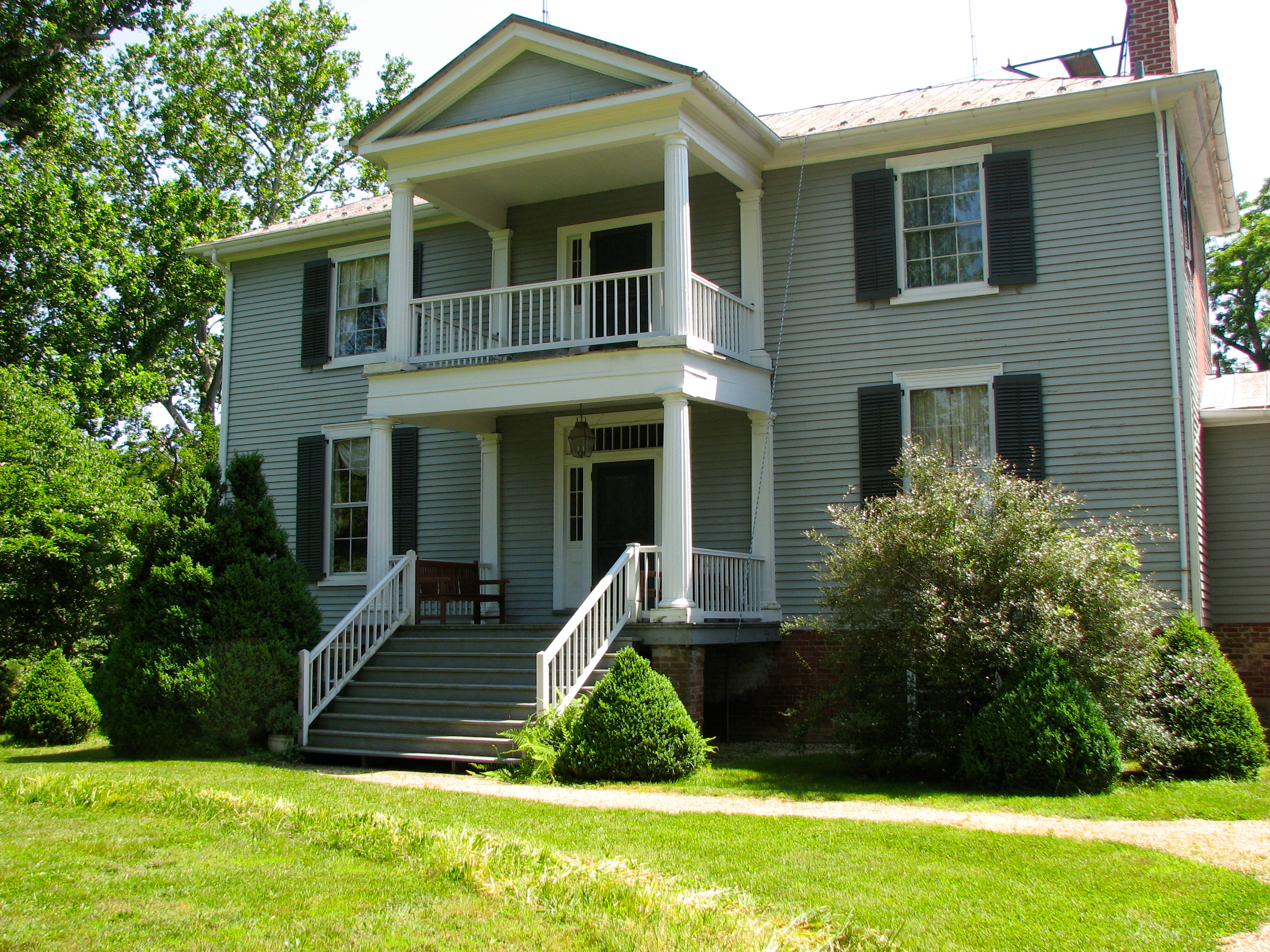
- La Vista (Spotsylvania County, Virginia)

- Location within Northern Virginia Location within Virginia Location within the United States
- Location: 4420 Guinea Station Rd., Guinea, Virginia
- Coordinates: 38°10′4″N 77°29′28″W
- Area: 10 acres (4.0 ha)
- Built: 1838
- Architectural style: Federal, Greek Revival
- NRHP reference No.: 97001508
- VLR No.: 088-0143

Significant dates
- Added to NRHP: December 1, 1997
- Designated VLR: September 17, 1997

La Vista, also known as The Grove, is a historic plantation house in Spotsylvania County, Virginia, United States. It was built about 1855, and is a two-story, three-bay, Federal / Greek Revival style frame dwelling. It has a hipped roof, interior end chimneys, and a pedimented portico with fluted Doric order columns. Also on the property are the contributing smokehouse and the Boulware family burial grounds.

La Vista was added to the National Register of Historic Places in December 1997.
