= Kenmore (Richmond, Massachusetts) =

Historic house in Massachusetts, United States

- U.S. National Register of Historic Places
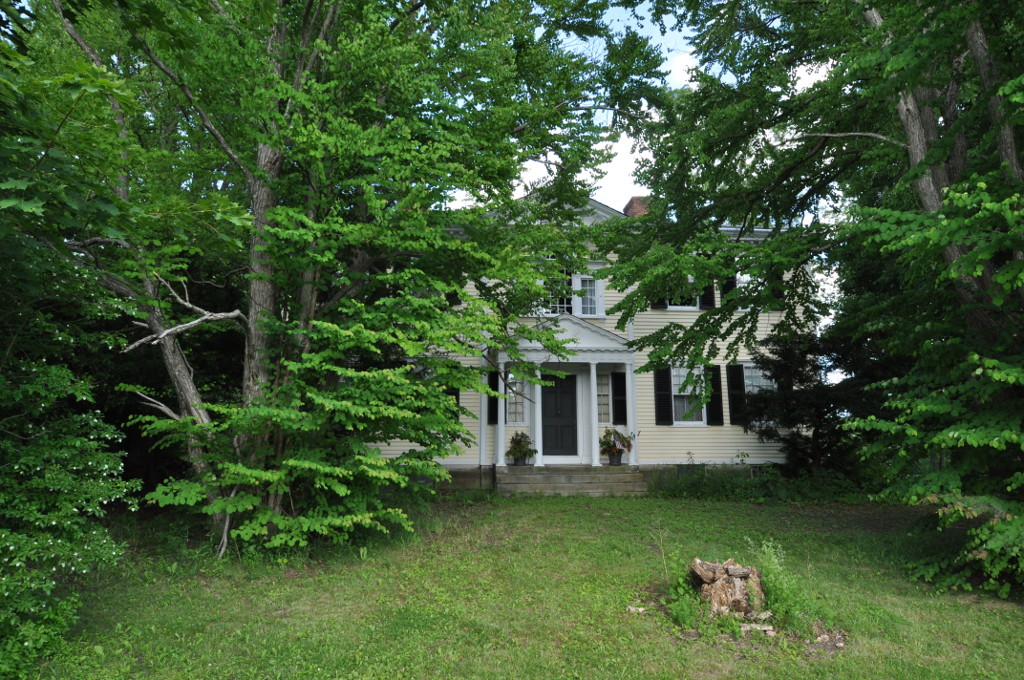

- Location within Massachusetts Location within the United States
- Location: Richmond, Massachusetts
- Coordinates: 42°23′37″N 73°21′54″W
- Built: 1792
- Architect: Peirson, Jerimiah Holsey
- Architectural style: Georgian, Federal, Colonial Revival
- NRHP reference No.: 96000326
- Added to NRHP: March 28, 1996

Kenmore is a historic house (built in 1792) at 1385 State Road (the junction of MA 295 and MA 41) in Richmond, Massachusetts. It was built by Henry Sherrill, one of Richmond's early settlers, and is a fine example of transitional Georgian-Federalist architecture. The house has retained much of its historic integrity despite significant renovation and modernization in the 20th century.

== History ==
Kenmore, a two-story five bay wood-frame house, was built c. 1792 for Henry Sherrill, an American Revolutionary War soldier who was first exposed to the area as a refugee from Long Island, which was under British occupation during the war. Sherrill became a merchant, operating a store in town. Sherrill's success in business is shown by the size of the house and the quality of its workmanship, which are locally rivalled only by Goodwood, built by Sherrill's builder Jerimiah Peirson around the same time. Sherrill's daughter married eventual Goodwood owner, the Rev. Edwin Welles Dwight.

Owners or occupants of the house during the 19th century include Selden Jennings, the local physician, and Jared Reid Jr., principal of a Stockbridge school; Reid was married to Henry Sherrill's granddaughter. The Reids operated a successful boarding school on the property, and were responsible for naming the property "Kenmore". The Reids expanded their offerings in the 1880s to include summer art school at the urging of their son Robert. Sessions were coordinated by Frederic Crowninshield, and students included Daniel Chester French, Newton Mackintosh, and their son Robert, who later gained notice as a painter.

In 1931 the property was acquired by Richard Harrison, a successful New York businessman, as a summer house. He had the house plumbing and electrical systems upgraded, and had a guest house and chicken coop built on the property. He also hired New York landscape designer Noel Chamberlain to oversee the landscaping of the property. Harrison's modifications to the house are notable for their sensitivity in preserving the integrity of the early Federal and Georgian details in the house, resulting in a blending of original details and later Colonial Revival designs.

The property was sold by the Harrison estate in 1938 to Reverend E. Pomeroy Cutler. Cutler operated the property as a boarding house, at which time it came to be used by a number of high-profile musical tenants associated with nearby Tanglewood, which began operations in 1937. This use continues to this day under its current owners. Notable residents and visitors to the house have included Leonard Bernstein, Aaron Copland, Lukas Foss, Gunther Schuller, and Olga Naumova Koussevitsky, widow of conductor Serge Koussevitsky.

The house was listed on the National Register of Historic Places in 1996.

Kenmore was purchased in January 2018 By fashion designer Frank Muytjens and Artist and entrepreneur Scott Edward Cole. After an extensive restoration to the historic property, Kenmore has been transformed into a bespoke luxury inn, The Inn at Kenmore Hall.

== See also ==
- National Register of Historic Places listings in Berkshire County, Massachusetts
