= Fairview (Spotsylvania County, Virginia) =

Historic house in Virginia, United States

- U.S. National Register of Historic Places
- Virginia Landmarks Register
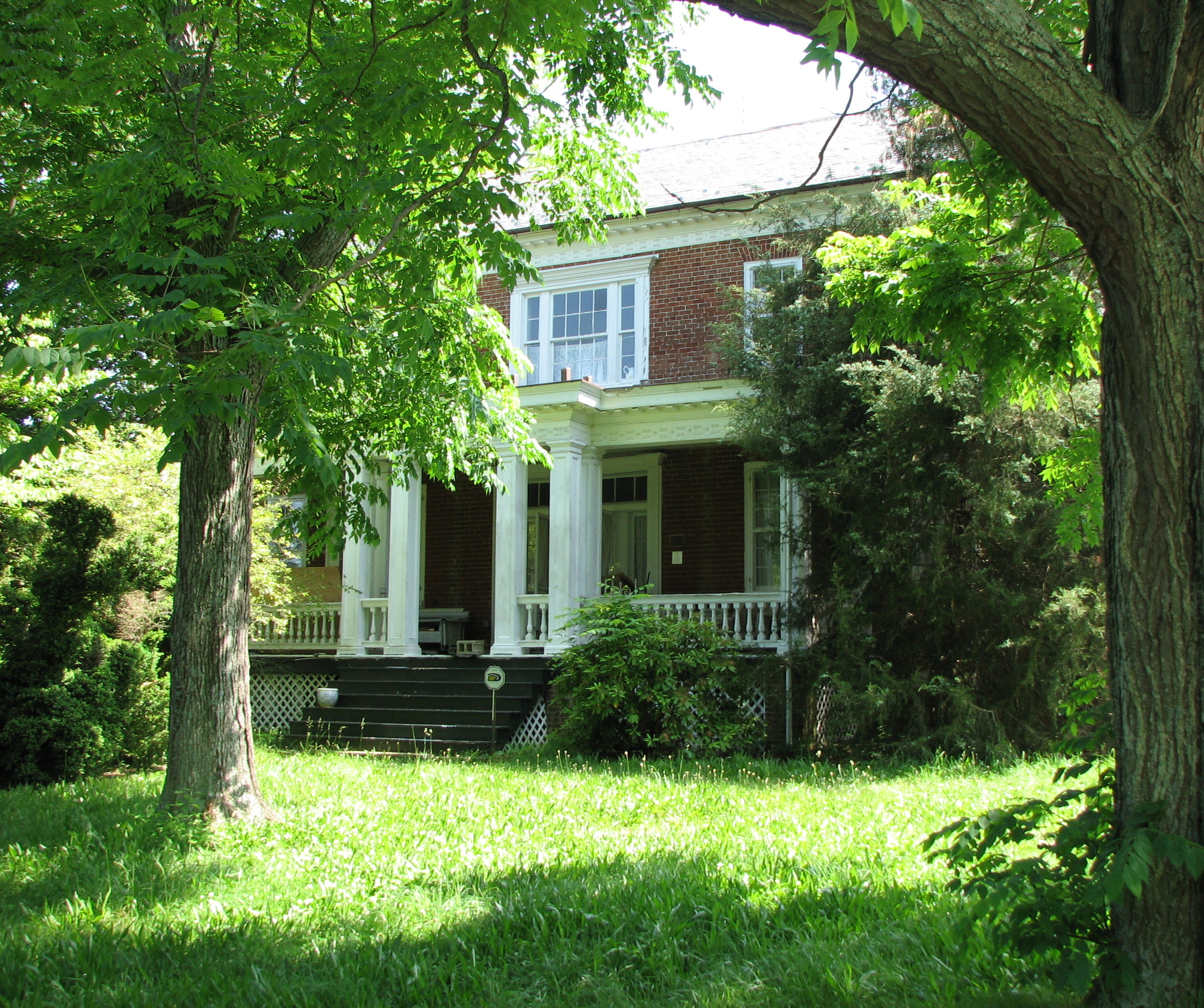
- Fairview (Spotsylvania County, Virginia)

- Location within Northern Virginia Location within Virginia Location within the United States
- Location: 2020 Whitelake Dr., Spotsylvania County, Virginia
- Nearest city: Fredericksburg, Virginia
- Coordinates: 38°14′25″N 77°30′53″W
- Area: 5 acres (2.0 ha)
- Built: 1837
- Built by: Samuel Alsop Jr.
- Architect: Samuel Alsop Jr.
- Architectural style: Federal
- NRHP reference No.: 93001460
- VLR No.: 088-0012

Significant dates
- Added to NRHP: December 30, 1993
- Designated VLR: October 20, 1993

Fairview is an historic home located near Fredericksburg, Virginia at 2020 Whitelake Drive. It is the largest of the historic homes in Spotsylvania County. The house was built in 1837 by Samuel Alsop, Jr. (1776-1859). Alsop was an architect and builder who designed a number of buildings in Spotsylvania including the Old Berea Church and Kenmore Woods (1829), which he built for his daughter.

After building homes for his daughters, Fairview was designed and constructed for Alsop himself. The Federal-style home is double-pile construction (meaning that there are two rooms between the front façade and the rear wall of the house). The site on which the home was built was originally 1,200 acres (490 ha). In the 1970s the land was subdivided for residences.

Fairview was added to the National Register of Historic Places in December 1993.
