= Chancellor, Virginia =

Chancellor
- Unincorporated community
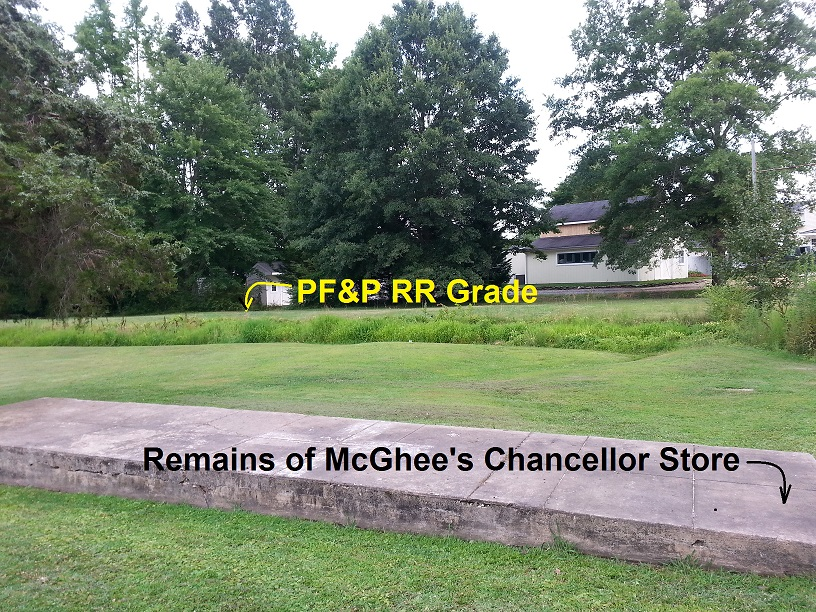
- Site of Chancellor P.O., Store & PF&P Railroad, Chancellor, Virginia
- Nickname: Screamersville
- Location within Northern Virginia Location within Virginia Location within the United States
- Coordinates: 38°17′02″N 77°36′04″W
- Country: United States
- State: Virginia
- County: Spotsylvania
- Elevation: 331 ft (101 m)
- Time zone: UTC-5 (Eastern (EST))
  - Summer (DST): UTC-4 (EDT)
- ZIP code: 22407
- Area code: 540
- GNIS: 1499237

Chancellor is an unincorporated community in Spotsylvania County, in the U.S. state of Virginia. Originally named Screamersville, the community was established as a railroad whistle stop west of Fredericksburg. The name was changed to Chancellor around 1927 by agreement of the railroad and the local community.

== History ==
Chancellor, Virginia is situated about 0.17 miles south of the intersection of Old Plank Road and Chancellor Road. Chancellor was established as a whistle stop on the Potomac, Fredericksburg and Piedmont Railroad, which began service in about 1878. The original name of the stop was Screamersville and the stop was nine miles west of the Fredericksburg Station. A local historian, Catherine Hilldrup Stanley attributed the name to the screaming of children when the train came to the station. The name was changed by the railroad sometime about 1927. The photo of a 1927 ticket still carries the Screamersville stop. The name change was the result of a September 1926 petition to the State Corporation Commission. The railroad was closed in January 1938.

In October 1889, word went out over the national wires that an Adventist sect near Screamersville, had predicted that the world would come to an end on October 23, 1889. Elder R.C. Brown lead a group of about 50 adventists in this vigil. In 1896 Captain Albert Reynolds, Company F, Fifty-fifth Virginia Regiment, on his way to Chancellorsville, was "passing by Screamersville, where the Second Adventists were holding a camp-meeting. The tents looked quite pretty, reminding me of the time when the Army of Northern Virginia dwelt in tents". The Screamersville Adventist camp was used at least through 1907.

The U.S. Post office probably dated from the establishment of the train station. The post office changed its name from "Screamersville" in 1919, well before the PF&P station. Regarding the name change, a December 8, 1919 article in The Daily Star noted "The change is to be made at the request of the people of that section, who, when canvassed, showed, that their sentiments favored the more euphnious name of Chancellor." The Daily Star article notes: "Mr. Chales A. McHenry .. took the matter up with the Postoffice Department with the result that the change will be made." After the end of train service in 1938, the US post office remained at the Chancellor Station location until 1966. In 2014, the remains to the post office and store consist of a concrete porch (see photo). Pat Sullivan remembers purchasing fireballs and wax lips and bubble gum and other needed supplies at this store. Lucille Roy McGhee was the postmaster for the 17 years prior to the office's closing. Her father-in-law, Acie McGhee was postmaster prior to her tenure. After the Chancellor post office was closed, the post office was moved to Five-Mile Fork to Hudsons's Store. The Chancellor store building was subsequently razed. 38° 16" 1' North, 77° 36" 3' West puts you at the location of the Chancellor store.

Chancellor is in the Chancellor Magisterial district of Spotsylvania County. Chancellor was served by an all grades school that is currently the Chancellor Community center on Old Plank Road at the intersection of Andora Drive. This school was replaced by the existing Chancellor Elementary School which was erected by the WPA in the 1930s. This "new" Chancellor school is on the north side of Route 3 (New Plank Road) near the northern end of Andora Drive.
