= Kenmore (Spotsylvania County, Virginia) =

Historic house in Virginia, United States

- U.S. National Register of Historic Places
- Virginia Landmarks Register
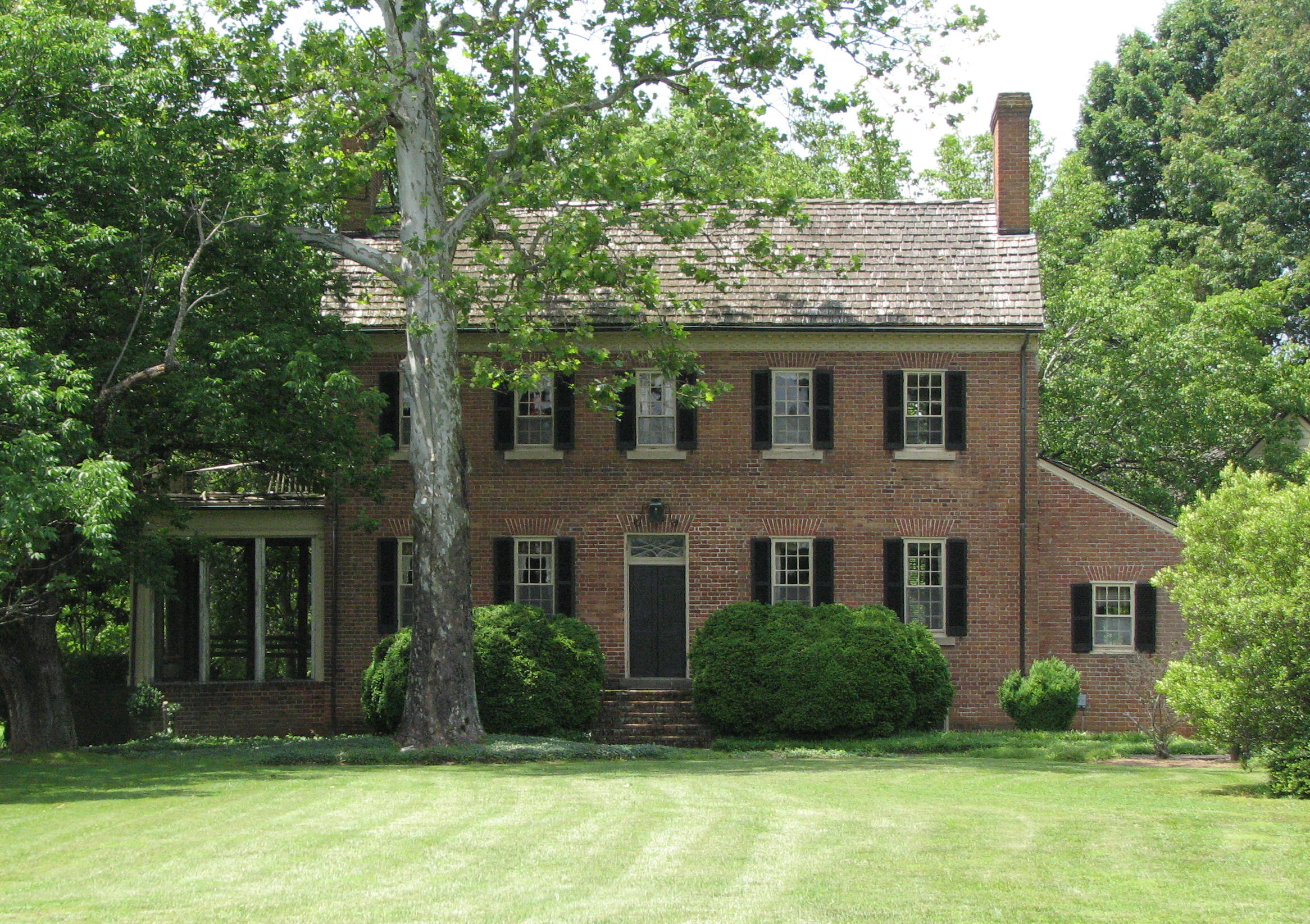
- Kenmore (also known as Kenmore Woods), Spotsylvania County, Virginia

- Location within Northern Virginia Location within Virginia Location within the United States
- Location: 8300 Courthouse Road, Spotsylvania County, Virginia
- Nearest city: Spotsylvania Courthouse, Virginia
- Coordinates: 38°11′6″N 77°35′47″W
- Area: 91.5 acres (37.0 ha)
- Built: 1829
- Architectural style: Federal
- NRHP reference No.: 93000569
- VLR No.: 088-0038

Significant dates
- Added to NRHP: June 24, 1993
- Designated VLR: April 21, 1993

Kenmore, (also known as Kenmore Woods), is a historic house in Spotsylvania County, Virginia, United States. It was built in 1829 by Samuel Alsop, Jr. (1776–1859) for his daughter Ann Eliza and her husband, John M. Anderson. The home bears the same name as the home of Fielding and Betty Lewis (Betty was the sister of George Washington) in nearby Fredericksburg, Virginia. To distinguish the houses, Kenmore in Spotsylvania County was renamed Kenmore Woods. Samuel Alsop, Jr. designed a number of homes in Spotsylvania County. In addition to Kenmore, he also designed and built "Oakley" for another daughter as well as his own home, "Fairview". In all, Alsop designed and built 10 homes.

== Design ==
Begun in 1828 and finished in 1829, the design of the home is Federal-style. The house was built on 430 acres (170 ha) that Alsop purchased in 1821. The relatively modest-sized Kenmore is unusual for Alsop in that it was designed with a narrow central hallway and a spiral staircase.

Another unusual aspect of the house is the brickwork. On the front and south sides, bricks are laid in Flemish bond pattern while the other sides are common bond. The present owners of the house suggest that the reason for this might be that the house sits on an intersection of two roads and thus visible from two sides.

The kitchen was originally an outbuilding – a structure built apart from the main house. It was common in Colonial times to separate the kitchen from the rest of the house because the kitchen was the working area of the household's slaves.

== History ==
The house was sold in 1832 to Dr. Hubbard Minor who, in 1836, added an ell to the rear of the home and a gable end shed roof. The ell is now a sitting room. The character of the additions was Greek Revival.

The house was located at the intersection of major roads near Spotsylvania Courthouse. During the American Civil War, the house was used by Colonel Walker of the Army of Northern Virginia as a headquarters during the Battle of Spotsylvania Courthouse in 1864.

Dr. Maxwell Harbin and his wife purchased the house in 1935 and changed the name of the home to Kenmore Woods because of the confusion with the home of George Washington's sister, Betty, in nearby Fredericksburg, Virginia. Sometime during the 1930s, a screened porch was added to the south side of the home. To create a passage from the house onto the porch, it was necessary to cut through four courses of brick. It was around this time that electricity and plumbing were added to the house.

Kenmore was added to the National Register of Historic Places in June 1993.
