= Spotsylvania Courthouse, Virginia =

Community in Virginia, US

- Unincorporated census-designated place
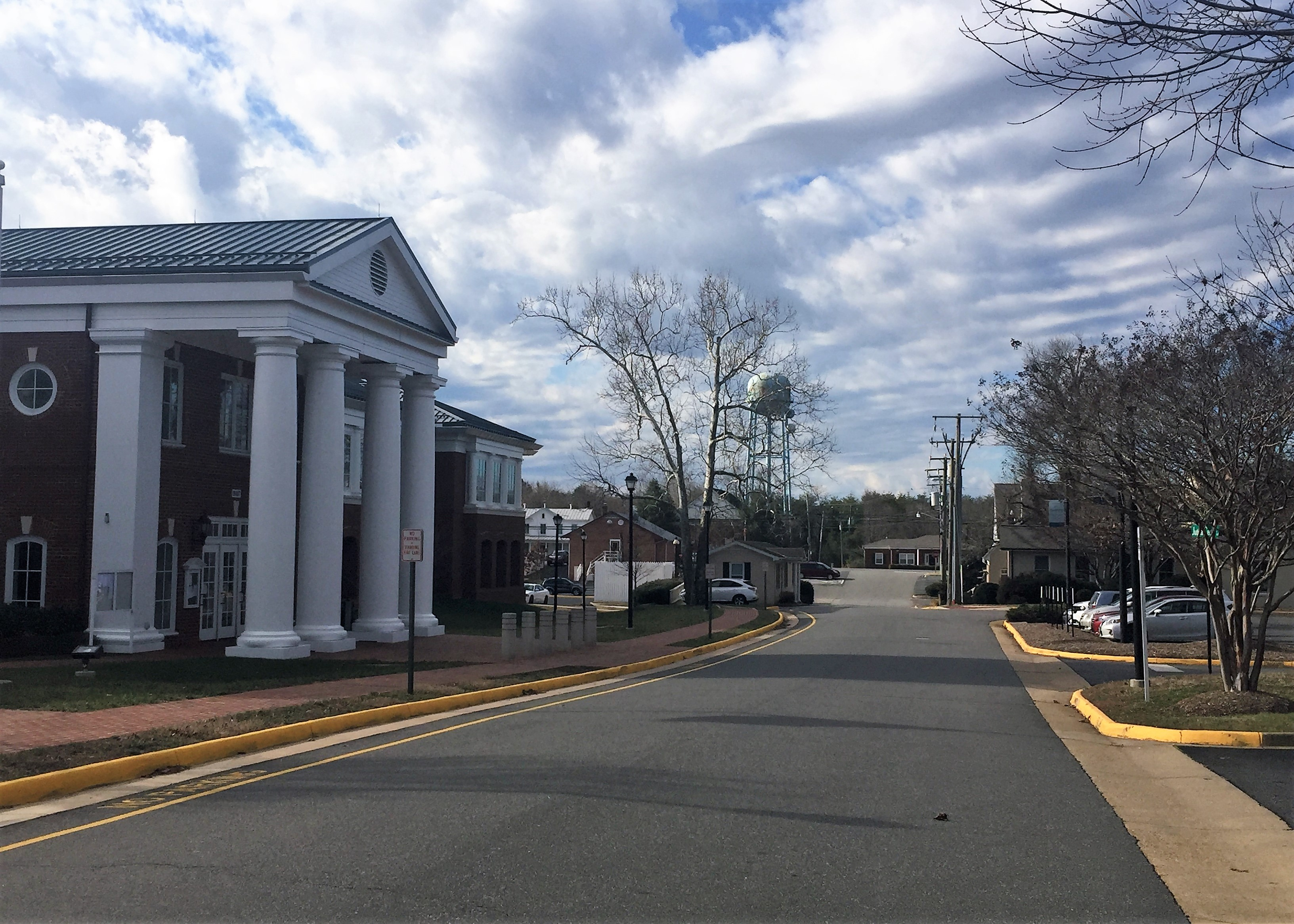
- A view along Judicial Center Lane in Spotsylvania Courthouse

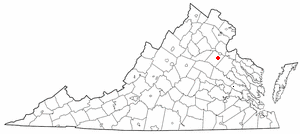
- Location of Spotsylvania Courthouse, Virginia
- Interactive map of Spotsylvania Courthouse, Virginia
- Coordinates: 38°12′7″N 77°35′15″W
- Country: United States
- State: Virginia
- County: Spotsylvania

Area
  - Total: 10.8 sq mi (28.0 km^{2})
  - Land: 10.7 sq mi (27.8 km^{2})
  - Water: 0.077 sq mi (0.2 km^{2})
- Elevation: 299 ft (91 m)

Population (2020)
  - Total: 5,610
  - Density: 523/sq mi (202/km^{2})
- Time zone: UTC−5 (Eastern (EST))
  - Summer (DST): UTC−4 (EDT)
- ZIP Codes: 22551, 22553
- FIPS code: 51-74470
- GNIS feature ID: 1867599

Spotsylvania Courthouse is a census-designated place (CDP) and the county seat of Spotsylvania County, Virginia, United States, located 10 miles (16 km) southwest of Fredericksburg. Recognized by the U.S. Census Bureau as a census-designated place (CDP), the population was 5,610 at the 2020 census.

During the American Civil War, the crossroads community became a Union objective during the Battle of Spotsylvania Courthouse, fought May 8–21, 1864. The battle, which ended in stalemate, included a brutal 20-hour struggle over a section of the Confederate defenses that became known as the "Bloody Angle". The site of the Bloody Angle and other portions of the battlefield are preserved as part of Fredericksburg and Spotsylvania County Battlefields Memorial National Military Park and administered by the National Park Service. The Fredericksburg and Spotsylvania National Military Park includes three cemeteries. Over 15,000 Union soldiers, many unidentified, are buried in the Fredericksburg National Cemetery. The other two cemeteries are dedicated to fallen Confederate soldiers.

== Geography ==
Spotsylvania Courthouse is located at 38°12′7″N 77°35′15″W (38.202080, −77.587499).

According to the United States Census Bureau, the census designated place (CDP) has a total area of 10.8 square miles (28.0 km^{2}), of which 10.7 square miles (27.8 km^{2}) is land and 0.07 square mile (0.2 km^{2}) (0.63%) is water.

== Demographics ==
As of the census of 2000, there were 3,833 people, 1,233 households, and 1,009 families residing in the CDP. The population density was 443.1 people per square mile (171.1/km^{2}). There were 1,268 housing units at an average density of 146.6/sq mi (56.6/km^{2}). The racial makeup of the CDP was 80.93% White, 15.05% African American, 0.21% Native American, 1.02% Asian, 0.63% from other races, and 2.17% from two or more races. Hispanic or Latino of any race were 2.79% of the population.

There were 1,233 households, out of which 50.3% had children under the age of 18 living with them, 65.0% were married couples living together, 12.2% had a female householder with no husband present, and 18.1% were non-families. 13.5% of all households were made up of individuals, and 4.1% had someone living alone who was 65 years of age or older. The average household size was 3.11 and the average family size was 3.42.

In the CDP, the population was spread out, with 34.2% under the age of 18, 7.9% from 18 to 24, 33.4% from 25 to 44, 19.4% from 45 to 64, and 5.1% who were 65 years of age or older. The median age was 32 years. For every 100 females, there were 99.0 males. For every 100 females age 18 and over, there were 92.7 males.

The median income for a household in the CDP was $55,872, and the median income for a family was $60,893. Males had a median income of $42,004 versus $30,494 for females. The per capita income for the CDP was $19,052. About 8.1% of families and 7.3% of the population were below the poverty line, including 10.0% of those under age 18 and 4.3% of those age 65 or over.
