= Harry Stewart Jr. =

American fighter pilot (1924–2025)

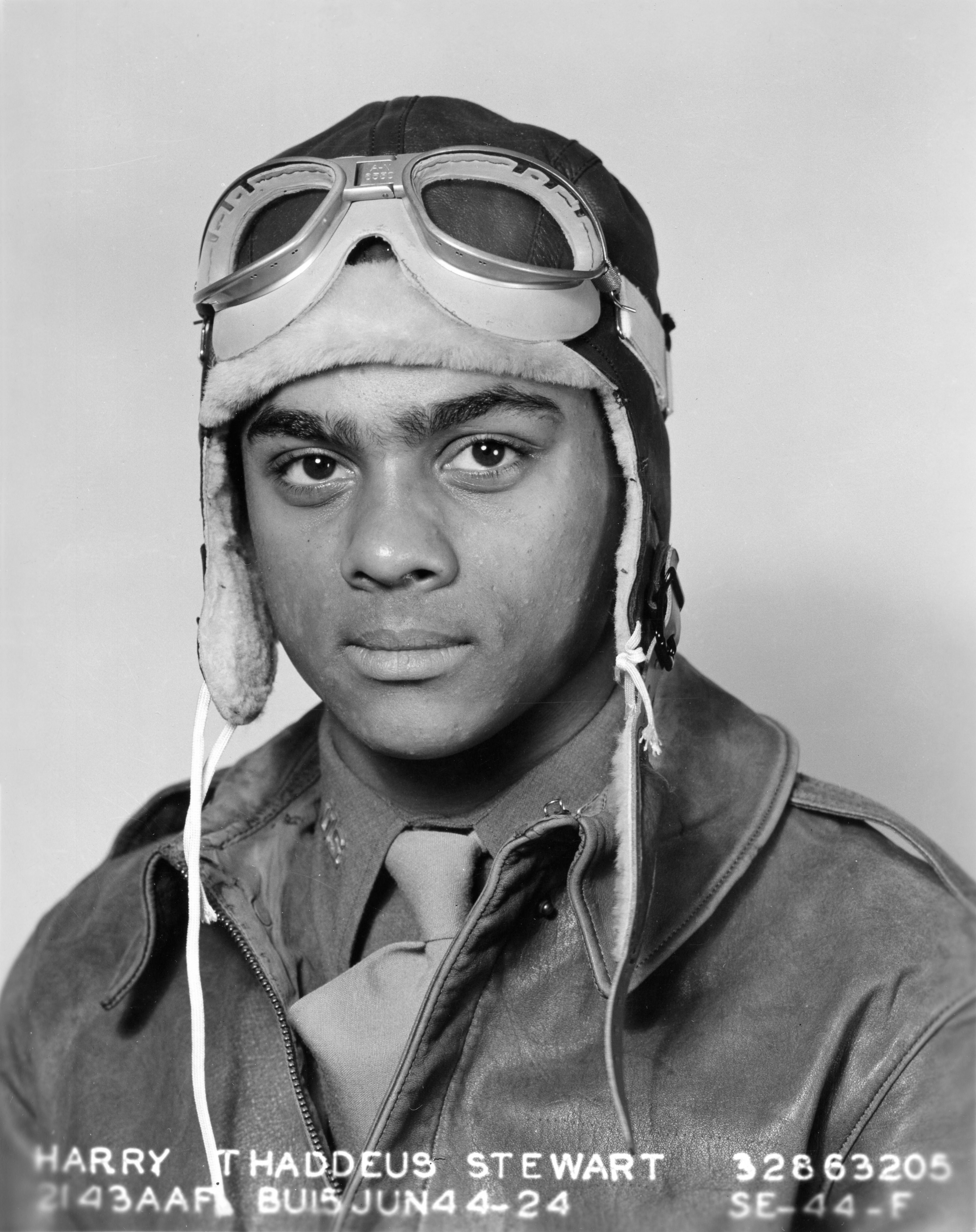
- Official U.S. Army Air Forces portrait (1944)
- Born: July 4, 1924; Newport News, Virginia, U.S.
- Died: February 2, 2025 (aged 100); Bloomfield Hills, Michigan, U.S.
- Spouse: Delphine Stewart (died 2015)
- Children: 1
- Military career
- Allegiance: United States
- Branch: United States Army Air Forces; United States Air Force
- Rank: Lieutenant Colonel
- Conflicts: World War II
- Awards: Distinguished Flying Cross; Congressional Gold Medal

Harry Thaddeus Stewart Jr. (July 4, 1924 – February 2, 2025) was an American fighter pilot. He was an officer in the United States Army Air Forces, and a Distinguished Flying Cross recipient who served in the 332nd Fighter Group, best known as the all–African American Tuskegee Airmen.

Stewart shot down three German aircraft in one day during World War II. He is one of only four Tuskegee Airmen, along with Joseph Elsberry, Clarence D. Lester and Lee Archer, to have earned three victories in a single day of aerial combat.

Stewart was also a member of the all-African American 332nd Fighter Group Weapons pilot team that won the United States Air Force's inaugural "Top Gun" team competition in 1949. Stewart, along with George Hardy and fellow 1949 Top Gun winner James H. Harvey, was among the last surviving members of the Tuskegee Airmen. The Tuskegee Airmen were awarded the Congressional Gold Medal in 2006. In 2019, Stewart co-wrote Soaring to Glory: A Tuskegee Airman's Firsthand Account of World War II, co-written by Philip Handleman.

== Early life and family ==
Stewart was born in Newport News, Virginia, on July 4, 1924. After living near Langley Field, a United States Air Force base located between Hampton, Virginia, and Newport News, Virginia, Stewart and his family moved to Queens near LaGuardia Airport and the North Beach Airport when he was two years old.

Stewart was married to Delphine Alice Friend Stewart (October 14, 1926 – November 5, 2015) – the sister of fellow Tuskegee Airman Robert Friend – until her death at the age of 89. They had one daughter, Lori Collette Stewart.

== Military career ==
At 18 years old, Stewart volunteered for the United States Army Air Forces, taking and passing the Pilot Cadet exam. On June 27, 1944, Stewart completed cadet pilot training, receiving his wings and graduating in the Tuskegee Airmen Class 44-F-SE. Stewart learned to fly before he learned how to drive an automobile.

After completing combat and fighter training at Walterboro Army Air Field in Walterboro, South Carolina, Stewart was assigned to the 15th Air Force in Italy at Ramatelli AB with the 332nd Fighter Group's 302nd Fighter Squadron. Upon the disbandment of the 302nd Fighter Squadron on March 6, 1945, Stewart was transferred to the 301st Fighter Squadron for the remainder of the war. During training, while Stewart was flying a training mock dogfight sequence, a strange P-47 came into his airspace. Representing a challenge, Stewart lost the mock dogfight against a pilot who revealed herself as a flaming redheaded member of the Women Airforce Service Pilots, or WASPs.

After being shipped off to France, Stewart and his fellow pilots sailed from Marseille to a port in Taranto onboard the luxurious cruise liner, Citie Doran. Stewart flew 43 bomber escort missions for the 15th Air Force to targets throughout Eastern Europe.

On Easter Sunday, April 1, 1945, he shot down three enemy German Focke-Wulf 190s during a B-24 bomber escort mission near Linz. For this feat, he was awarded the Distinguished Flying Cross. During this mission his friend and squadron mate, Walter Manning, was shot down. Captured by German civilians, Manning was lynched by the "Werewolves", a paramilitary group of partisan German and Austrian soldiers who broke into the jailhouse housing Manning after the SS incited the group to kill Manning. On Easter Sunday in 2018, after an exhaustive investigation, the Austrian government hosted Stewart to attend a national parade honoring Manning's memory.

Stewart is one of only four Tuskegee Airmen to have achieved three aerial victories in a single day of combat. The other three are: Joseph Elsberry, Clarence D. Lester and Lee Archer. Moreover, Stewart is one of only nine 332nd Fighter Group pilots with at least three confirmed kills during World War II. The others include:

- Joseph Elsberry – 332nd Fighter Group's 301st Fighter Squadron – 4 Confirmed Kills, 1 Possible
- Edward L. Toppins – 332nd Fighter Group's 99th Fighter Squadron – 4 Confirmed Kills, 1 Possible
- Lee Archer – 332nd Fighter Group's 302nd Fighter Squadron – 4 Confirmed Kills
- Charles B. Hall – 332nd Fighter Group's 99th Fighter Squadron – 3 confirmed kills
- Leonard M. Jackson – 332nd Fighter Group's 99th Fighter Squadron – 3 Confirmed Kills
- Clarence D. Lester – 332nd Fighter Group's 100th Fighter Squadron – 3 Confirmed Kills
- Wendell O. Pruitt – 332nd Fighter Group's 302nd Fighter Squadron – 3 Confirmed Kills
- Roger Romine – 332nd Fighter Group's 302nd Fighter Squadron – 3 Confirmed Kill, 1 Unconfirmed
- Harry Stewart Jr. – 332nd Fighter Group's 301st Fighter Squadron – 3 Confirmed Kills

=== 1948 Butcher Hollow P-47 Thunderbolt crash ===
On March 25, 1948, Stewart took part in a simulated armed reconnaissance with a formation of Tuskegee Airmen combat fighter pilots flying from Sumter, South Carolina's Shaw Air Force Base to their home base in Columbus, Ohio. Suddenly, Stewart's P-47 Thunderbolt began to experience severe engine failure, sputtering at 20,000 feet above the mountainous terrain of Eastern Kentucky during a bad thunderstorm. Fearful of fatally crashing his aircraft into the side of a mountain, Stewart descended to 10,000 feet before bailing out of the plane. Since the P-47 lacked an ejection seat, Stewart slid its canopy back, removed his seat belt, and directed the P-47's nose forward so that it would dip and safely eject Stewart forward when he released the control stick. However, the slipstream struck Stewart, forcefully propelling him to the aircraft's tail, fracturing his left leg between the calf and ankle.

After opening his parachute in the clouds, Stewart drifted down, landing on top of a dead pine tree. With Stewart's parachute firmly hooked over the tree top, Stewart's body dangled two feet above the ground through the tree's dead branches. Possibly going into shock, Stewart noticed that he had lost a shoe on his broken, bleeding left leg. His otherwise white sock was now completely blood-soaked. Stewart cut himself down in the pouring rain, crawled under a rock overhang, and removed his white silk flying scarf, making a tourniquet to stop the bleeding.

Unbeknownst to him, Stewart had parachuted into the forested hills of Butcher Hollow, Kentucky, a coal-mining community in Johnson County, Kentucky and childhood home of married fifteen-year-old Loretta Webb (April 14, 1932 – October 4, 2022), best known as 18-time Grammy Award–nominated country music legend Loretta Lynn. Though Loretta's location at the time of the crash is undocumented, Loretta's younger brother, Herman Webb (September 3, 1934 – July 28, 2018), was riding in the pickup truck bed belonging to Loretta and Herman's father, Melvin Theodore "Ted" Webb (1906–1959). Herman heard a massive explosion unlike anything his family had ever experienced, despite living in a coal camp accustomed to loud blasts. After Stewart bailed out, the P-47 flew across the Webb family cemetery, crashed into a hilltop overlooking the Webb family home, and created a 10–15 foot deep crater. Over the course of several days, local boys and men began to ransack the crash site. One eyewitness saw Loretta's 22-year-old moonshiner husband, Oliver Lynn ("Doolittle" Lynn), driving his Jeep with Stewart's plane propeller attached to its side. One of Loretta and Herman's uncles converted the P-47's stainless steel nuts into finger rings.

Loretta and Herman's nine-year-old neighbor, Callie Daniels (now octogenarian and retired elementary school cook, Callie Daniels Johnson of Hager Hill, Kentucky), saw Stewart's white parachute converging to earth, mistaking it for a large white eagle. Callie notified her father, Lafe Daniels (1910–1969), who mounted and rode one of his horses into the hills, finding an injured Stewart lying underneath a rock cliff. After a mutually befuddled though benign stare-down, Lafe put the injured Stewart on a second horse Lafe had brought along, taking Stewart to the Daniels family home where Lafe's wife, Mary Daniels, was washing clothes in a large backyard cauldron.

Mary tore up some bedsheets, and disinfected and bandaged Stewart's legs. After giving Stewart "all-purpose" moonshine for pain relief, much to Stewart's chagrin as he had sworn off liquor for Lent, Lafe reloaded Stewart on the horse and took him onto a muddy gravel road to a local store on the main road. From there, Stewart was loaded into a pickup truck and transported to the local Paintsville Clinic in Paintsville, Kentucky, birth home of then-unborn Brenda Gail Webb (born January 9, 1951), best known as Crystal Gayle, Grammy Award-winning country music singer and Herman Webb and Loretta Lynn's younger sister.

The clinic's physician and his team washed Stewart, placed him in a bed, and administered morphine for pain relief. Stewart recalled being in a hallucinated state as a result of the morphine and moonshine. As news of the P-47 crash circulated, local people lined up to the clinic to view the injured African American combat fighter pilot. The town's mayor, Escom Chandler (1946–1949), visited Stewart, followed by the town's police chief, county sheriff and a Paintsville Herald news reporter who ran a story on March 25, 1948. The article omitted Stewart's race. Around 1:00 a.m. on March 26, 1948, a USAF representative from Columbus, Ohio, arrived at the Paintsville Clinic to pick up Stewart. They departed the small rural community without any fanfare or formal sendoff. Stewart's wife, Delphine, did not find out about her husband's mountainous aircraft crash until Stewart arrived home.

For many years afterwards, local legend, though patently false, held that USAF Republic F-84 Thunderjets shot down a B-52 bomber stolen by an African American man conducting a bombing run on the town. In 2005, Danny Keith Blevins, a Johnson County, Kentucky teacher and president of the Van Lear Historical Society, tracked down Stewart at his home in southern Michigan. Stewart was bemused when Blevins shared the "stolen B-52" rural legend, as B-52s did not yet exist in 1948.

In 2006, the Van Lear, Kentucky township encompassing Butcher Hollow, Kentucky named Stewart its parade marshal for the annual Homecoming Day parade. During his Kentucky visit, Stewart met the family of Crystal Gayle, Loretta Lynn and Herman Webb, enjoying a tour of Loretta's birth home.

=== Winner of the 1949 "Top Gun Competition" ===
In January 1949, the Chief of Staff of the U.S. Air Force sent out a directive to each Air Force group requesting their participation in an aerial weapons competition. Four months later in May 1949, Stewart joined the 332nd Fighter Group three-member propeller division pilot team to compete at the USAF's inaugural "Top Gun" team competition held at the Las Vegas Air Force Base (now Nellis Air Force Base).

A grueling 10-day event, the competition comprised six events: aerial gunnery at 20,000 feet, aerial gunnery at 12,000 feet, dive bombing, skip bombing, rocket firing, and panel strafing. His team lead from start to finish.

Stewart's team included the 99th Squadron's James H. Harvey (born 1923), the 300th Squadron's Captain Alva Temple (September 5, 1917 – August 28, 2004), the 99th Squadron's First Lieutenant Halbert Alexander (June 12, 1922 – March 25, 1953), who served as an alternate pilot, and Staff Sergeant Buford A. Johnson (August 30, 1927 – April 15, 2017) who served as the team's aircraft crew chief.

The results (including the three-foot-high winning silver trophy stashed in a Wright Patterson Air Force Base Museum storage area for 55 years), were absent from the Air Force archives until 1995. Flying in obsolete F-47Ns, a variant of the P-47 Thunderbolt, Stewart and his team won against U.S. Air Force fighter group teams in far more advanced aircraft. Stewart's team member, James H. Harvey remarked: "They knew who won, but did not want to recognize us."

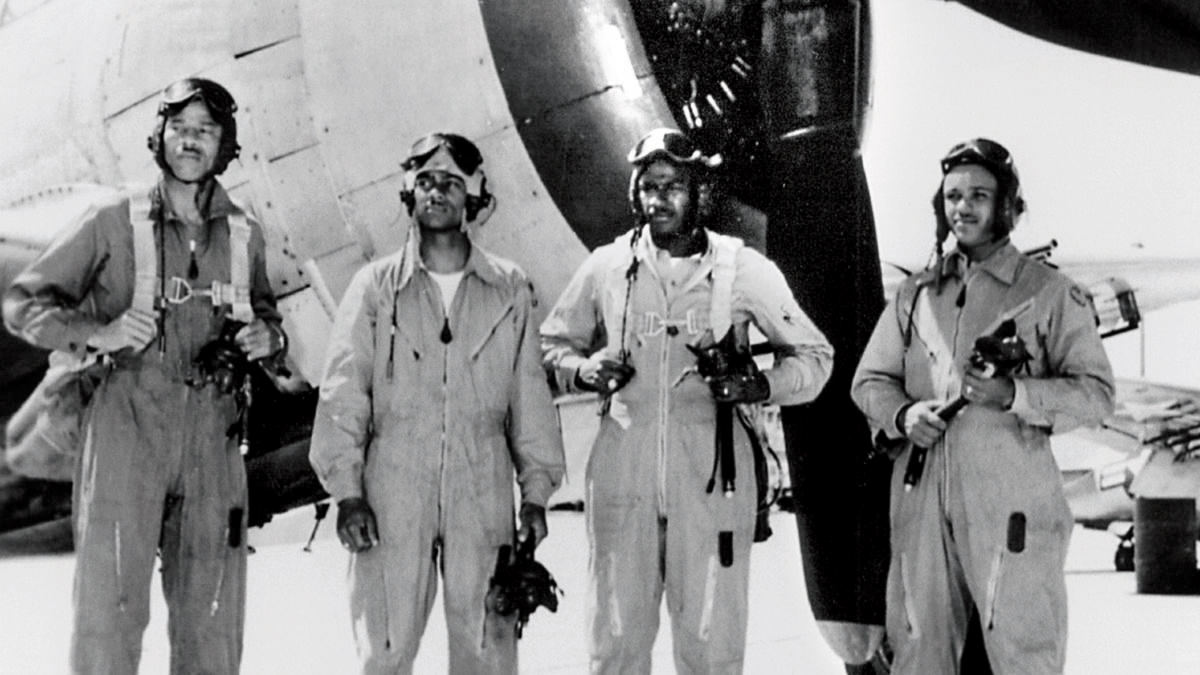
Temple, Stewart, Harvey and Alexander after winning the 1949 Fighter Gunnery Competition

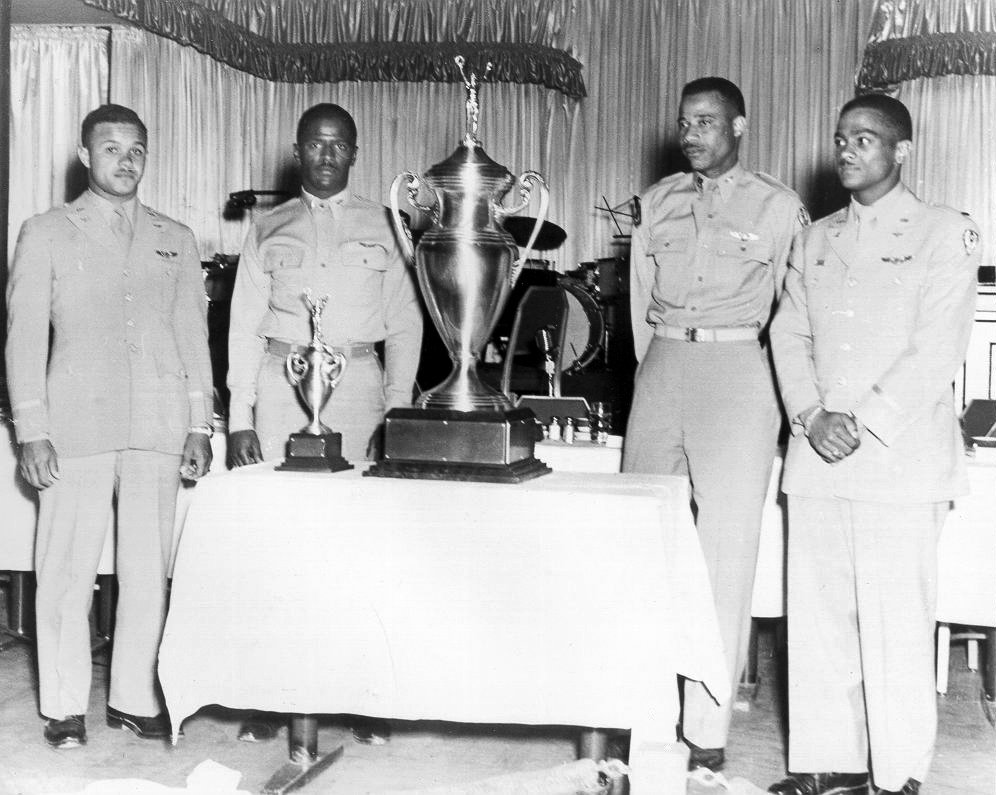
Alexander, Harvey, Temple and Stewart at the awards ceremony

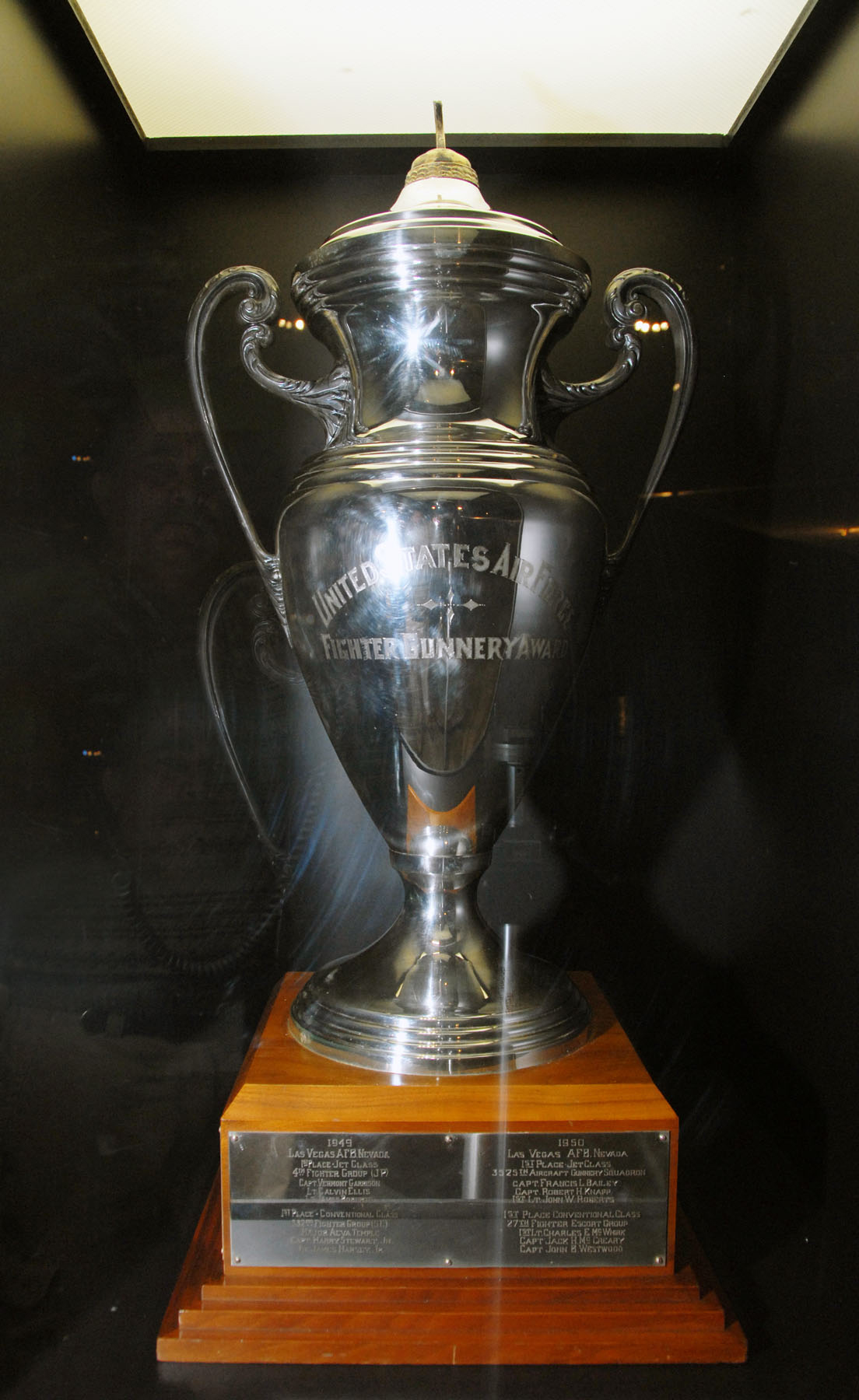
Trophy on display in 2011

=== Reserve service ===
In 1950, Stewart received an honorable discharge from active duty. He continued his service as a member of the U.S. Air Force Reserves, later retiring with the rank of lieutenant colonel.

Stewart remarked that he hid from his military doctors a heart murmur and a childhood bout with polio.

== Post-military career ==
After returning from World War II, Stewart worked as a baggage man for a train depot. He also applied to become a pilot in the commercial airline industry; however, two separate airlines, including the defunct Trans World Airlines, denied Stewart because of his race. As recompense, Delta Air Lines and American Airlines granted Stewart honorary Captain status in 2015 and 2018, respectively.

As a backup plan, Stewart completed his high school diploma and enrolled at New York University (NYU), graduating with a degree in mechanical engineering in 1963. While at NYU, Stewart served as President of NYU’s student council and chair of the American Society of Mechanical Engineers.

Stewart retired as Vice President of the ANR Pipeline Company (formerly the Michigan-Wisconsin Pipe Line Company) in Detroit, Michigan, a large-scale interstate natural gas pipeline system operations.

In 2019, Stewart co-wrote Soaring to Glory: A Tuskegee Airman's Firsthand Account of World War II, co-written by Philip Handleman.

A widower, Stewart lived in Bloomfield Hills, Michigan, with his daughter, Lori Collette Stewart. Stewart turned 100 on July 4, 2024, and died in Bloomfield Hills on February 2, 2025.

== See also ==
- Dogfights (TV series)
- Executive Order 9981
- List of Tuskegee Airmen Cadet Pilot Graduation Classes
- List of Tuskegee Airmen
- Military history of African Americans
- The Tuskegee Airmen (movie)
