= Alva Temple =

Tuskegee Airman fighter pilot (1917–2004)

Lieutenant Colonel Alva Temple
- Alva Temple
- Born: Alva Newte Temple; August 5, 1917; Carrollton, Alabama, US
- Died: August 28, 2004 (aged 87); Columbus, Mississippi, US
- Burial place: Cook-Temple Memorial Cemetery, Pickensville, Alabama
- Education: Alabama A & M University
- Spouse: Lucille née Grimes
- Military career
- Allegiance: United States of America
- Branch: United States Army Air Force
- Service years: 1943–1962
- Rank: Lieutenant Colonel
- Unit: 332nd Fighter Group
- Awards: Congressional Gold Medal (2007)

LTC Alva Newte Temple (September 5, 1917 – August 28, 2004) was an officer in the U.S. Army Air Forces and combat fighter pilot with the 332nd Fighter Group's 99th Fighter Squadron and 300th Squadron, best known as the all-African American Tuskegee Airmen, "Red Tails," or among enemy German pilots, “Schwartze Vogelmenschen” ("Black Birdmen"). He was one of the 1007 documented Tuskegee Airmen Pilots.

In 1949, Temple and his all-African American 332nd Fighter Group Weapons pilot team won 1st Place in the U.S. Air Force's inaugural "Top Gun" team competition.

== Early life and family ==
Temple was born on September 5, 1917, in rural Carrollton, Alabama in Pickens County.

As a child, Temple picked cotton to help support his family during the depression. He attended (what is now known as) Alabama A&M University, graduating with a degree in Agricultural Education.

Temple was married to Lucille Grimes Temple for nearly 60 years.

== Military career, Tuskegee Airmen ==
At the age of 24, Temple ended his studies at Alabama A&M University and applied for pilot training. Because of entrenched racial discrimination and racial segregation in the U.S. military, there were no separate facilities for black pilots prior to 1942. When Temple initially applied to the U.S. Army Air Forces (USAAF), he was immediately rejected based on race. Once the USAAF created the Tuskegee Pilot Cadet program in Tuskegee, Alabama, Temple applied and was admitted. On July 28, 1943, Temple graduated from Tuskegee's Class 43-G-SE, receiving his pilot wings and commission as a 2nd Lieutenant. He was immediately assigned to the 332nd Fighter Group's 99th Pursuit Squadron.

Temple was described as a “reliable, dependable and unexcitable” pilot “who loved to fly and was always willing to make a mission though he realized the risk involved.” Temple once remarked: “I felt I could fly if given a chance. A lot of people thought I was crazy. They thought I’d be killed, but I didn’t pay them any attention. As long as I could abide by the requirements, I could take care of it.”

During World War II, Temple completed 120 missions, including over Italy, Germany, Yugoslavia, Hungary, Romania, southern France and the Balkans. He flew a Red-Tailed P-40 and a P-51 Mustang, earning the Distinguished Flying Cross (United States).

Temple served 20 years in the military, in the United States Army Air Forces and the United States Air Force (USAF), retiring in 1962 as a lieutenant colonel.

== Winner of the 1949 "Top Gun Competition" ==
In January 1949, the Chief of Staff of the U.S. Air Force sent out a directive to each Air Force group requesting their participation in an aerial weapons competition. Four months later, in May 1949, Temple joined the 332nd Fighter Group Weapons three-member pilot team to compete at the USAF's inaugural "Top Gun" team competition held at the Las Vegas Air Force Base (now Nellis Air Force Base).

A grueling 10-day event, the competition comprised six events: aerial gunnery at 20,000 feet, aerial gunnery at 12,000 feet, dive bombing, skip bombing, rocket firing and panel strafing. Temple's team led from start to finish.

Temple's 332nd Fighter Group team included the 100th Squadron's First Lieutenant Harry Stewart, Jr., the 99th Squadron's James H. Harvey, 99th Squadron's First Lieutenant Halbert Alexander (June 12, 1922 – March 25, 1953), who served as an alternate pilot, and Staff Sergeant Buford A. Johnson (August 30, 1927 – April 15, 2017) as aircraft crew chief Harvey and his team competed in P-47N Thunderbolts.

The results (including the 3-foot high silver winning trophy stashed in a Wright Patterson Air Force Base Museum storage area for 55 years), were absent from the USAF archives until 1995. Flying F-47Ns, a variant of the Republic P-47 Thunderbolt, Temple and his team won against USAF fighter group teams in far more advanced aircraft. His teammate, James H. Harvey remarked: "They knew who won, but did not want to recognize us."

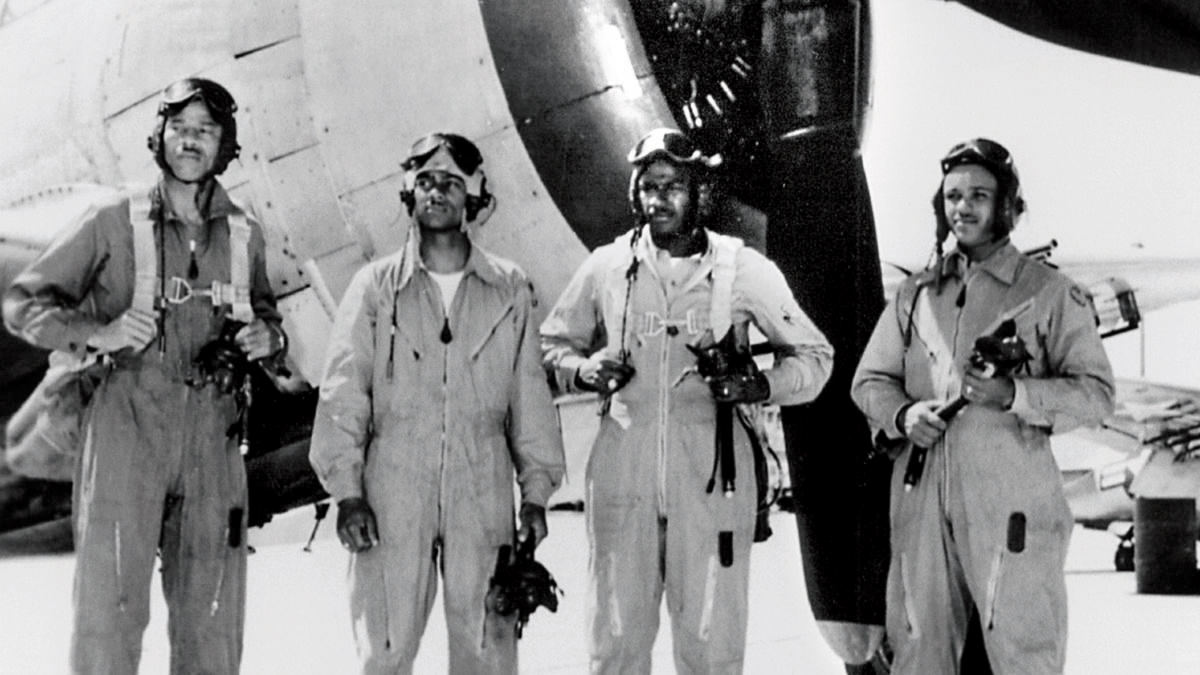
Temple, Stewart, Harvey and Alexander after winning the 1949 Fighter Gunnery Competition

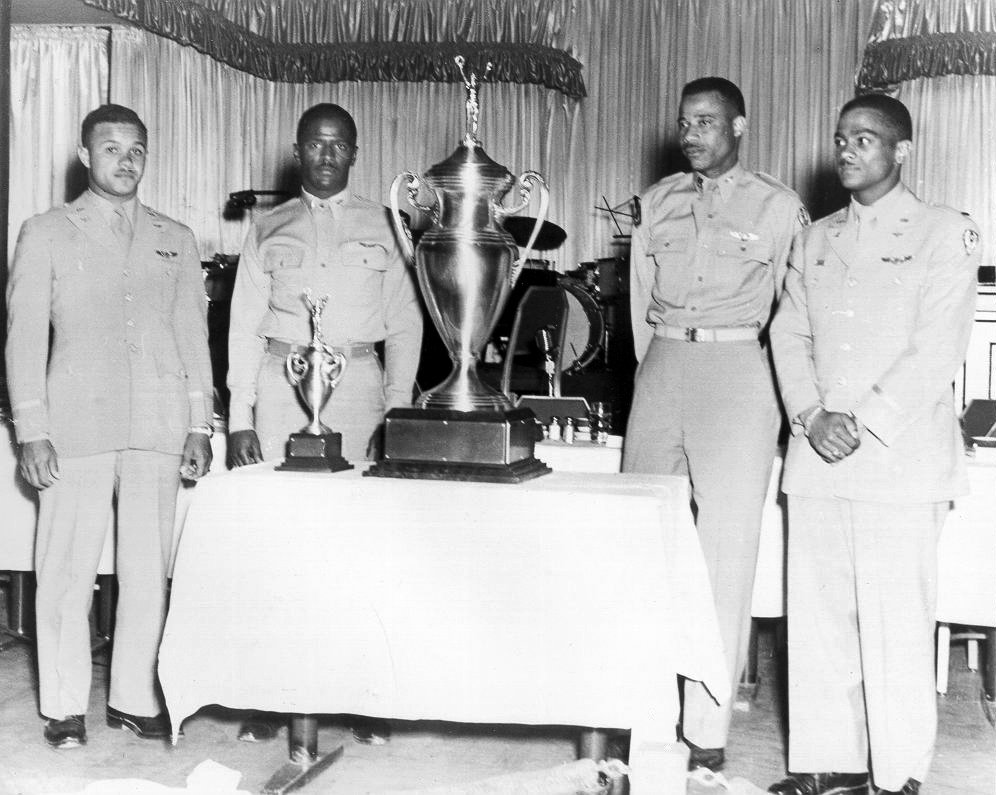
Alexander, Harvey, Temple and Stewart at the awards ceremony

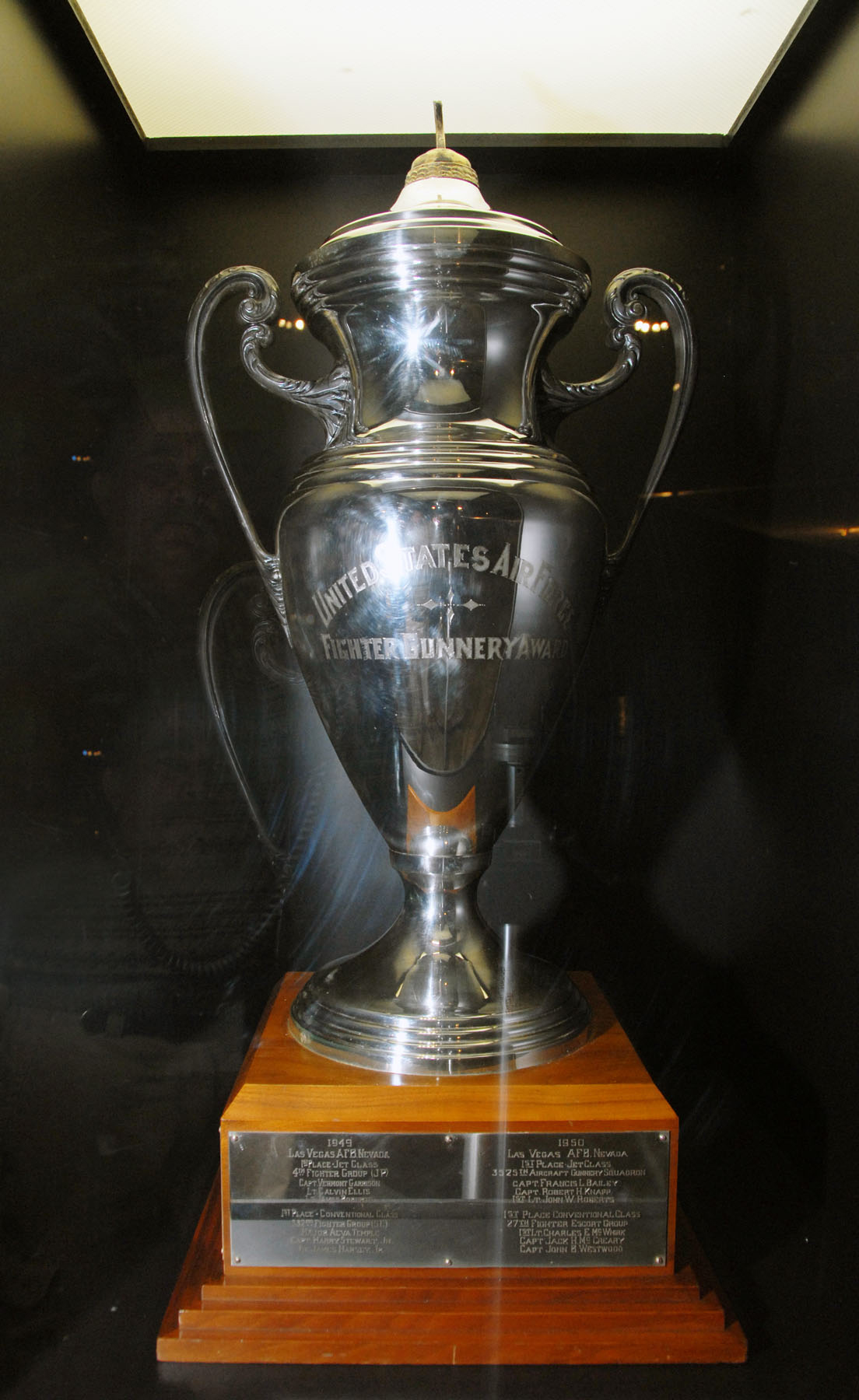
Trophy on display in 2011

== Awards ==
- Congressional Gold Medal (2007, posthumous)

== Post-military career ==
After his retirement from the USAF in 1962, Temple moved to Mississippi and owned/operated a Gulf Service station and Temple's BP Stations and Radiator Sales on Highway 69 in Columbus, Mississippi. He also became a prominent local and statewide leader. He served seven years as the commissioner for the Mississippi State Department of Natural Resources Committee.

Before his passing in 2004, Temple incorporated the Columbus, Mississippi Alva N. Temple Chapter of Tuskegee Airmen.

== Death ==
On August 28, 2004, Temple died at his home in Columbus, Mississippi. He is interred at the Cook-Temple Memorial Cemetery in Pickensville, Alabama.

== Legacy ==
In 2008, Col. Dave Gerber, then-14th Flying Training Wing Commander at Columbus AFB, renamed the base's A Street to "Alva Temple Road" in recognition of Temple.

In 2012, Temple's family donated memorabilia from Temple's personal collection towards the inaugural R.E. Hunt Museum and Cultural Center located at the former site of R.E. Hunt High School, Columbus, Mississippi’s only African American high school until integration in 1971.

== See also ==
- List of Tuskegee Airmen Cadet Pilot Graduation Classes
- List of Tuskegee Airmen
- Military history of African Americans
- Dogfights (TV series)
- Executive Order 9981
- The Tuskegee Airmen (movie)
