= Buford A. Johnson =

Tuskegee Airman, aircraft mechanic (1927–2017)

- Born: August 30, 1927; Longview, Texas, US
- Died: April 15, 2017 (aged 89)
- Occupation: Military airplane mechanic
- Known for: Tuskegee Airmen

Master Sergeant Buford A. Johnson (August 30, 1927 – April 15, 2017) was a member of the famed group of African-American World War II pilots and support personnel known as the Tuskegee Airmen. During World War II, he served as the chief mechanic servicing the fighter planes of the 99th Fighter Squadron of the 477th Composite Group.

In May 1949, Johnson served as the aircraft crew chief of the 332nd Fighter Group Weapons three-member pilot team that won the U.S. Air Force's inaugural "Top Gun" team competition held at the Las Vegas Air Force Base (now Nellis Air Force Base).

== Biography ==
=== Early life ===
Buford A. Johnson was born in Longview, Texas on August 30, 1927. He was raised in Shiloh, Texas, graduating from the Shiloh High School in 1945.

=== Military career ===
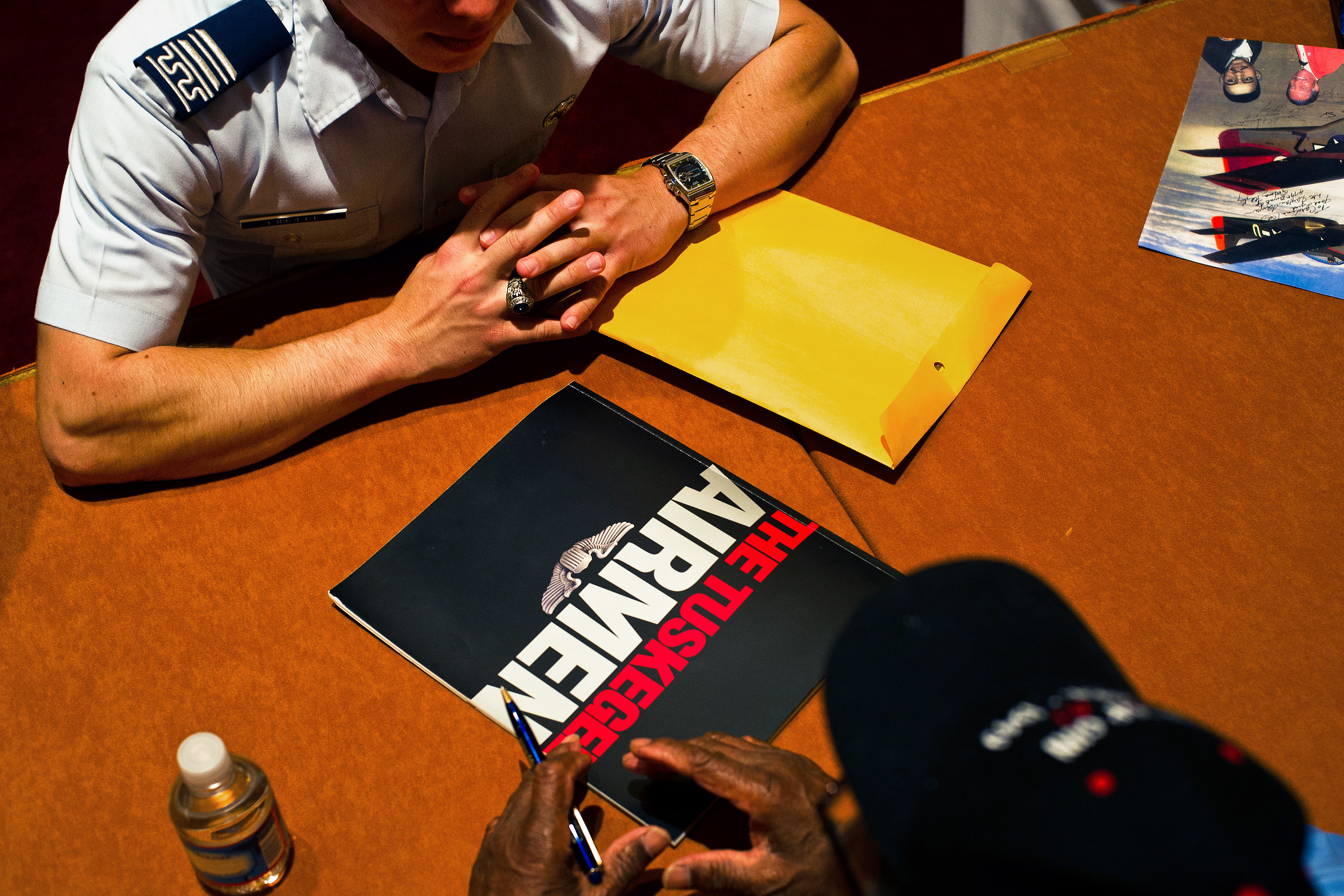
An Air Force cadet speaks with Tuskegee Airman Buford Johnson during the 40th Tuskegee Airmen national convention at Gaylord National Hotel in National Harbor, Md., Aug. 6, 2011. Defense.gov photo essay 110806-F-RH756-151

When Johnson was 18 years old, the U.S. Military drafted him into the U.S. Navy. At the time, the only tasks that African-American men were allowed to do in the Navy were menial jobs, which he was not interested in doing. He learned that volunteering for a three-year tour of duty in the U.S. Army would supersede the draft orders, so Johnson instead enlisted in the U.S. Army Air Forces in 1945. He became one of the first African-Americans allowed to work on U.S. fighter aircraft.

Johnson did his Basic Training at Sheppard Field Texas. Upon graduating, he was assigned to the 99th Fighter Squadron of the 477th Composite Group which was stationed at Godman Field, Kentucky.

After World War II, Johnson was stationed at Lockbourne AFB in Ohio and from there was transferred to Itazuke Air Base in Japan. At Itaszuke, his orders were to support a P-51 (later designated F-51) Mustang fighter Squadron; his abilities earned him the honor of being a mechanic on the 80th Fighter-Bomber Squadron's first F-80C Shooting Star aircraft. He became the first African-American to be a jet mechanic in the United States Air Force, a Crew Chief to work on jet aircraft, and a Crew Chief working on jet aircraft in a combat zone.

Johnson was transferred out of the Korean War zone on 19 December 1951 and was assigned a month later to the 6520th Test Support Wing, Air Force Cambridge Research Center, on the Hanscom AFB in Bedford, Massachusetts as an Aircraft Maintenance Supervisor in January 1952. He was promoted from Technical Sergeant to Master Sergeant on 1 April 1953.

On 25 July 1956, Johnson received orders to transfer to the 50th Fighter-Bomber Wing in Toul-Rosières Air Base in France, where he reported three weeks later on 15 August 1956. He was assigned to the 417th Fighter Group. On 29 July 1960, Johnson was transferred to the Air Force Test Center at Edwards Air Force Base, California. During his time working with the 417th Tactical Fighter Squadron at Edwards Air Force Base, Buford received the Air Force Commendation Medal for Meritorious Service on 21 December 1962.

He remained at Edwards Air Force Base until July 1965, at which point he received orders to transfer to Oxnard Air Force Base, California to take up the duties of Non-Commissioned Officer in Charge of Maintenance Control.

Johnson retired in 1966.

== Aircraft Crew Chief of the Winning 1949 "Top Gun Competition" Team ==
In January 1949, the Chief of Staff of the U.S. Air Force sent out a directive to each Air Force group requesting their participation in an aerial weapons competition. Four later in May 1949, Johnson served as the aircraft crew chief for the 332nd Fighter Group Weapons three-member pilot team that won the U.S. Air Force's inaugural "Top Gun" team competition held at the Las Vegas Air Force Base (now Nellis Air Force Base).

A grueling 10-day event, the competition comprised six events: aerial gunnery at 20,000 feet, aerial gunnery at 12,000 feet, dive bombing, skip bombing, rocket firing and panel strafing. The all-African American team led from start to finish.

The pilot team included the 300th Squadron's Captain Alva Temple (September 5, 1917 – August 28, 2004), 100th Squadron's First Lieutenant Harry Stewart, Jr., the 99th Squadron's James H. Harvey, and the 99th Squadron's First Lieutenant Halbert Alexander (June 12, 1922 – March 25, 1953), who served as an alternate pilot. Harvey and his team competed in P-47N (later designated F-47N) Thunderbolts.

The results and the 3-foot high silver winning trophy, stashed in a Wright Patterson Air Force Base Museum storage area for 55 years, were absent from the U.S. Air Force archives until 1995. Flying F-47Ns, an improved variant of the Republic P-47 Thunderbolt of World War II fame, the team won against U.S. Air Force fighter group teams in far more advanced aircraft such as the F-51 and F-82 Twin Mustang. Johnson's teammate, James H. Harvey remarked: "They knew who won, but did not want to recognize us."

=== Death ===
Master Sergeant Buford A. Johnson died on April 15, 2017. He was interred in Riverside National Cemetery in Riverside, California, Section 53B, Site 2808.

== Awards ==
=== Individual awards ===
- U.S. Air Force Medal for Meritorious Service
- Letter of appreciation from the Department of Homeland Security California Service Center's Director Christina Poulos

=== Group award ===
The Tuskegee Airmen were collectively awarded the Congressional Gold Medal for their service to their country on April 11, 2006. The original medal was given to the Smithsonian Institution and the individual members received replicas.
