= Halbert Alexander =

American Tuskegee Airman fighter pilot (1922–1953)

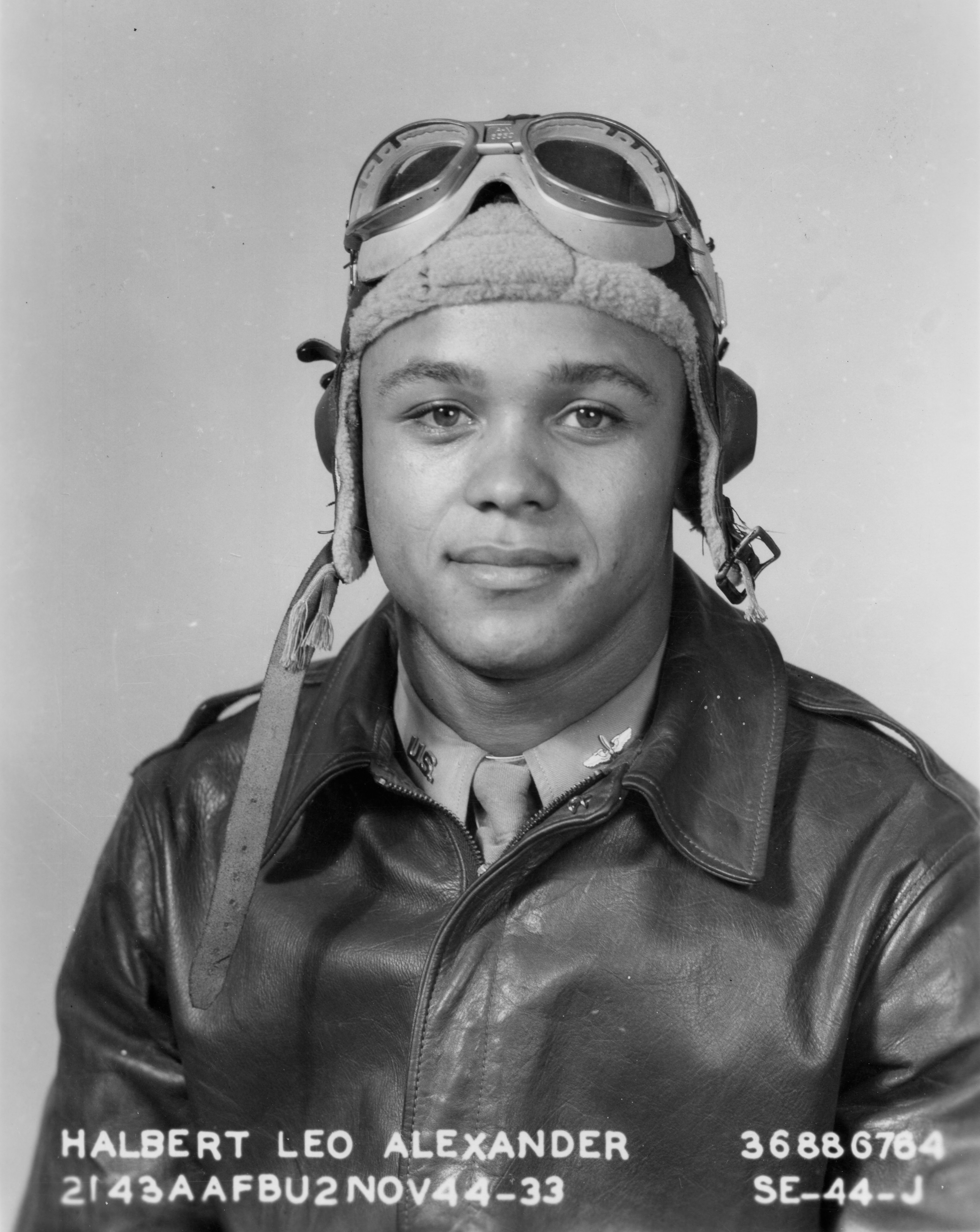
- Official U.S. Army Air Forces portrait (1944)
- Born: Halbert Leo Alexander; June 12, 1922; North Carolina, US
- Died: March 25, 1953 (aged 30); Chelmsford, Massachusetts, US
- Resting place: Georgetown Cemetery, Georgetown, Illinois
- Occupations: Military officer; fighter pilot
- Years active: 1944–1953

Halbert Leo Alexander (June 12, 1922 – March 25, 1953) was an officer in the U.S. Army Air Forces and U.S. Air Force and a fighter pilot with the all-African American 332nd Fighter Group's 99th Fighter Squadron and 300st Fighter Squadron, colloquially known as the Tuskegee Airmen. He was one of the 1007 documented Tuskegee Airmen Pilots.

Halbert Leo Alexander was temporarily posted to England in 1945 before serving in Italy.

Alexander is noteworthy for winning the U.S. Air Force's 1949 inaugural "Top Gun" team competition with his all-African American 332nd Fighter Group Weapons pilot team.

== Early life and education ==
Halbert Alexander was born on June 12, 1922, in North Carolina.

On November 20, 1944, Alexander graduated from Tuskegee's Class 44-I-S, receiving his wings and commission as a second lieutenant. He was assigned to the 99th Pursuit Squadron.

== Winner of the 1949 "Top Gun" competition ==
In January 1949, the Chief of Staff of the U.S. Air Force sent out a directive to each Air Force group requesting their participation in an aerial weapons competition. Four months later in May 1949, Alexander was selected as an alternate pilot for the 332nd Fighter Group Weapons three-member pilot team that won the U.S. Air Force's inaugural "Top Gun" team competition held at the Las Vegas Air Force Base (now Nellis Air Force Base).

A grueling 10-day event, the competition comprised six events: aerial gunnery at 20,000 feet, aerial gunnery at 12,000 feet, dive bombing, skip bombing, rocket firing, and panel strafing. Alexander and his team led from start to finish.

Alexander's 332nd Fighter Group team included the 100th Squadron's First Lieutenant Harry Stewart, Jr., the 99th Squadron's James H. Harvey, the 300th Squadron's Captain Alva Temple, and Staff Sergeant Buford A. Johnson (August 30, 1927 – April 15, 2017) as aircraft crew chief. Harvey and his team competed in obsolete P-47N Thunderbolts.

The results and the three-foot-tall silver winning trophy, stashed in a Wright Patterson Air Force Base Museum storage area for 55 years, were absent from the U.S. Air Force archives until 1995. Flying F-47Ns, a variant of the Republic P-47 Thunderbolt, Temple and his team defeated U.S. Air Force fighter group teams in far more advanced aircraft. His teammate, James H. Harvey remarked, "They knew who won, but did not want to recognize us."

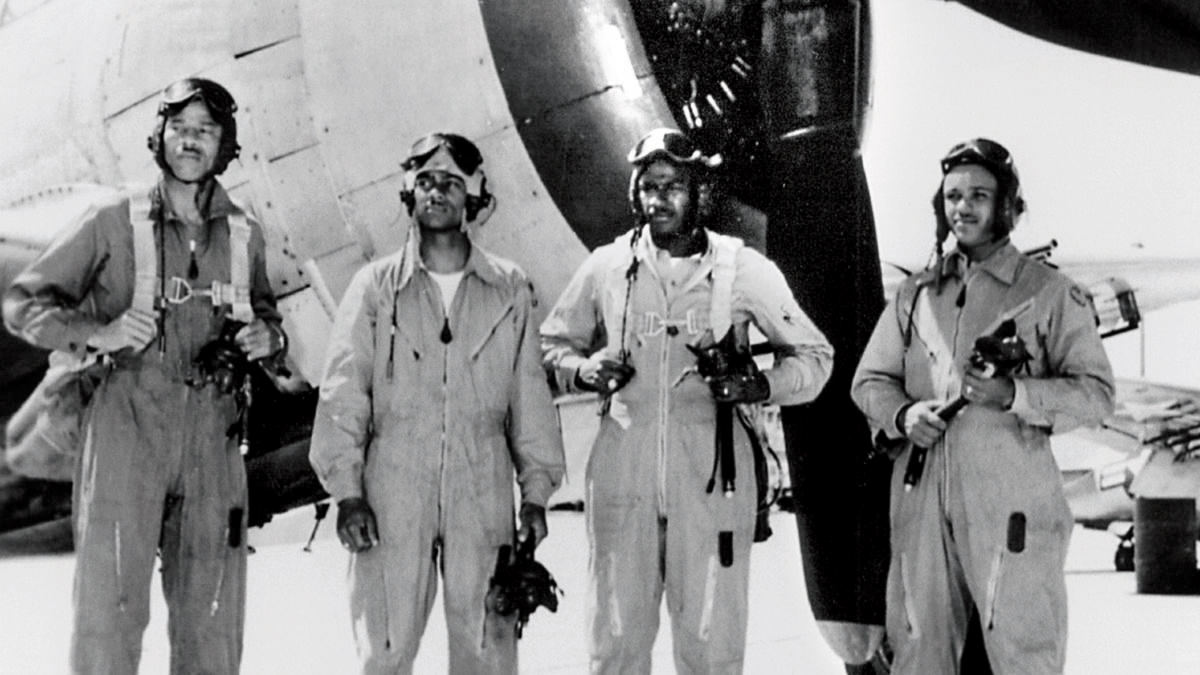
Temple, Stewart, Harvey and Alexander after winning the 1949 Fighter Gunnery Competition

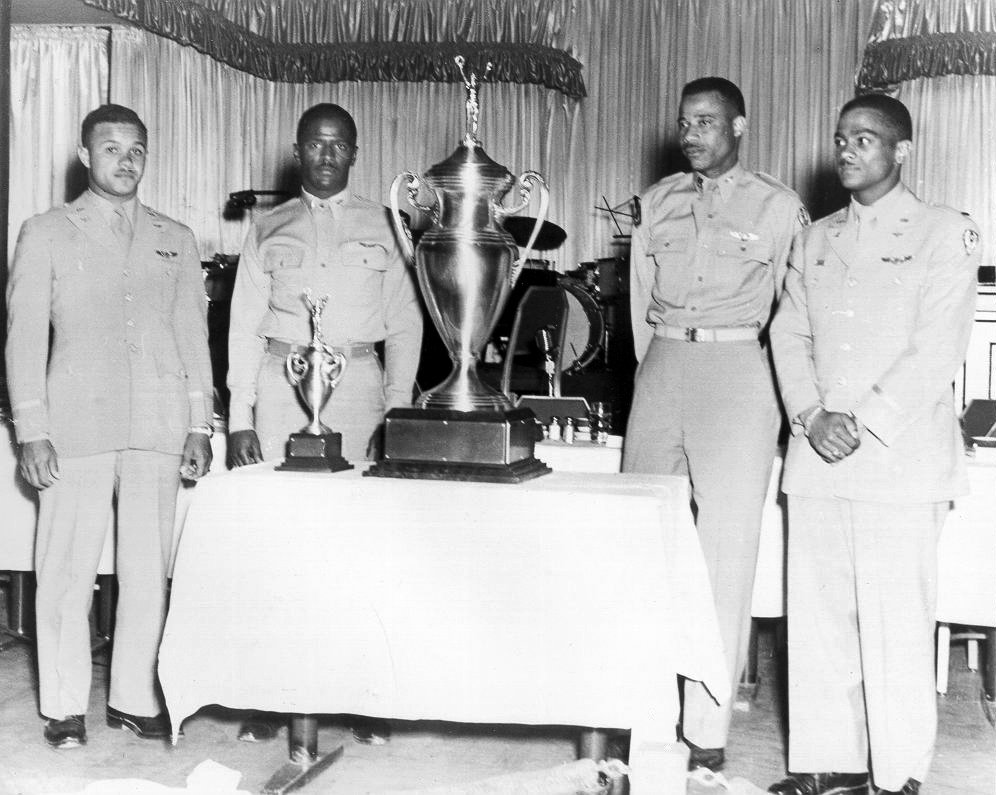
Alexander, Harvey, Temple and Stewart at the awards ceremony

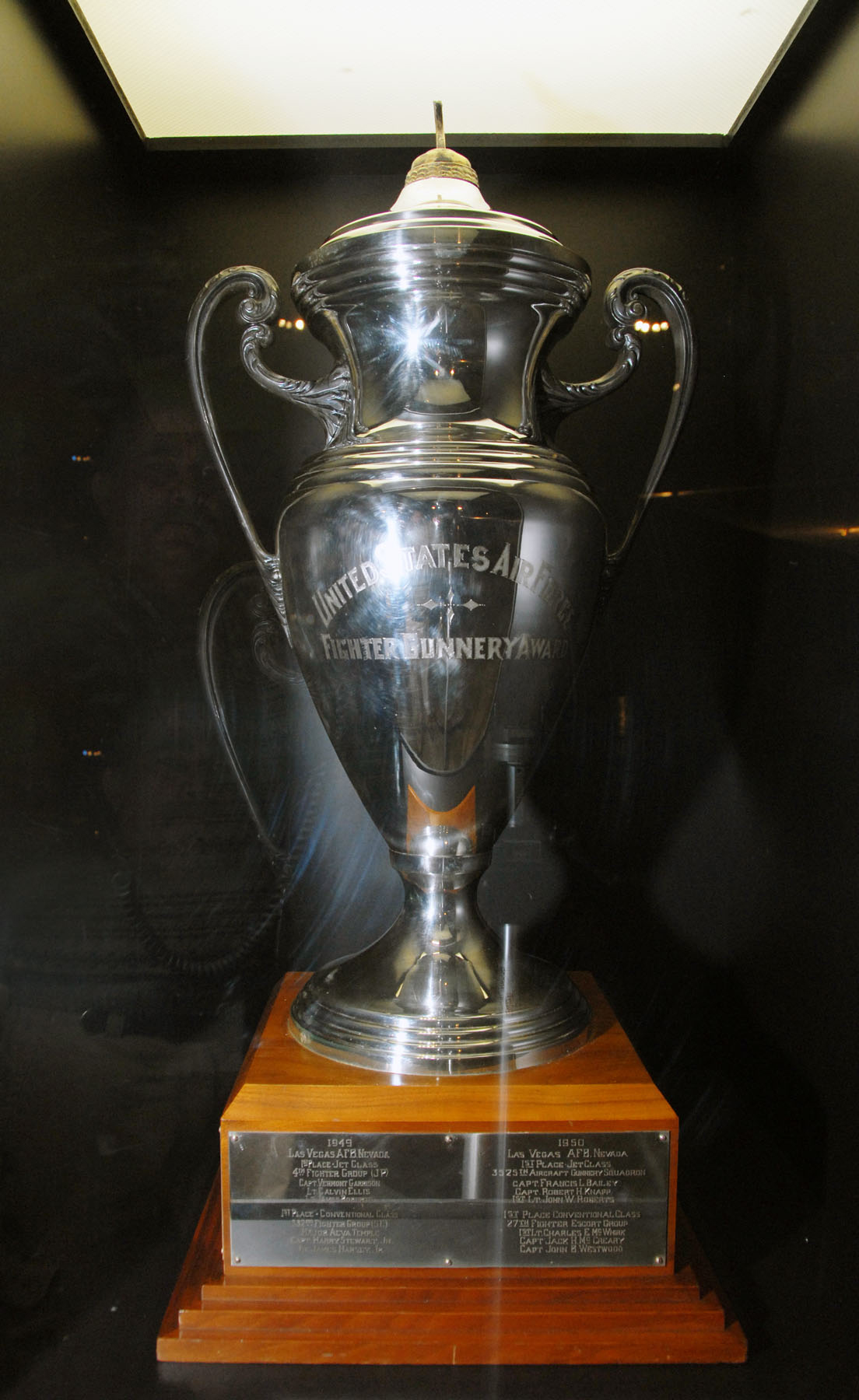
Trophy on display in 2011

== Death ==
On March 25, 1953, Alexander, then 30 years old, was killed instantly when his F-51 Mustang nosedived out of a seven-plane formation and exploded in a heavily forested area near Chelmsford, Massachusetts. His plane tore through the treetops for almost 100 yards before exploding and strewing over a half-mile. Police authorities who found his body identified him as 1Lt Halbert Alexander, a married pilot from Plymouth, Ohio.

== See also ==
- Executive Order 9981
- List of Tuskegee Airmen
- List of Tuskegee Airmen Cadet Pilot Graduation Classes
- Military history of African Americans
