= The Tuskegee Airmen =

1995 American television film

- DVD Cover art
- Genre: Drama; History; War
- Teleplay by: Trey Ellis; Ron Hutchinson; Paris Qualles
- Story by: T. S. Cook; Robert Wayland Williams
- Directed by: Robert Markowitz
- Starring: Laurence Fishburne; Allen Payne; Malcolm-Jamal Warner; Courtney B. Vance; Andre Braugher; Christopher McDonald; Daniel Hugh Kelly; Mekhi Phifer; John Lithgow; Cuba Gooding Jr.
- Music by: Lee Holdridge
- Country of origin: United States
- Original language: English

Production
- Executive producer: Frank Price
- Producer: Bill Carraro
- Cinematography: Ron Orieux
- Editor: David Beatty
- Running time: 106 minutes
- Production companies: HBO Pictures; Price Entertainment
- Budget: $8.5 million (estimated)

Original release
- Network: HBO
- Release: August 26, 1995

The Tuskegee Airmen is a 1995 HBO television movie based on the exploits of an actual groundbreaking unit, the first African-American combat pilots in the United States Army Air Forces who fought in World War II. The film was directed by Robert Markowitz and stars Laurence Fishburne, Cuba Gooding Jr., John Lithgow, Courtney B. Vance, Andre Braugher, Malcolm-Jamal Warner, Allen Payne, and Mekhi Phifer.

== Plot ==
During World War II, Hannibal "Iowa" Lee Jr. travels by train to Tuskegee, Alabama for military flight training, along with fellow African-American flight cadets Billy "A-Train" Roberts, Leroy Cappy, Walter Peoples III, and Lewis Johns. Colonel Noel Rogers, the base commander, welcomes the cadets, but his director of training, Major Sherman Joy, maintains that African-Americans aren't suitable to serve as military pilots. Also on staff is Second Lieutenant Glenn, a Black pilot who had flown in the Battle of Britain with the Royal Canadian Air Force.

Major Joy has the cadets retake the flight exam they took to qualify for the program, ostensibly to prove they cheated their way in; the cadets all pass with flying colors. Shortly after the move to practical flight training, Johns and his instructor are killed when Johns fails to recover from a stall. Several cadets quit the program as a result, but Lee and Peoples convince Cappy and Roberts to stay on. Later, Lieutenant Glenn informs the remaining cadets that he is the only officer on base with any combat experience, having shot down three Messerschmitt Bf 109s during his time in the RCAF. His example further inspires the cadets to stick it out. Soon after, however, Peoples dramatically kills himself after Joy removes him from flight training over an alleged aerial infraction. Although shaken, Lee refuses to let Joy's tactics get the better of him, and again convinces his fellow cadets to carry on.

The cadets graduate with commissions as second lieutenants in the Army Air Corps, but are not deployed overseas due to the efforts of the racist Senator Conyers. First Lady Eleanor Roosevelt intervenes, inspecting the base and flying with Lee. The ensuing positive press coverage prompts their deployment to North Africa as the 99th Pursuit Squadron. However, they are relegated to ground-attack and reconnaissance missions, leading to a growing frustration as some pilots grow desperate for air combat. A chance encounter with a flight of Bf 109s leads to Cappy engaging them against Lee's orders, resulting in his death.

Cappy's death is used as evidence at a congressional hearing of the House Armed Services Committee, where Senator Conyers declares it proof that it's time to end the Tuskegee Experiment. As a verdict is about to be reached. Colonel Benjamin O. Davis, the 99th's commanding officer, is brought in; his first-hand testimony, which illustrates both the strain and double standards his men are under, helps to change the Committee's mind. Soon after, the 99th joins three new squadrons out of Tuskegee to form the all-Black 332nd Fighter Group, under Colonel Davis's overall command.

The 332nd deploys to Ramitelli, Italy, to fly escort missions for B-17 Flying Fortresses, which are experiencing heavy losses. Lee and Roberts sink a destroyer, and rescue a straggling B-17 flown by Captain Butler. When Butler and his co-pilot, Lieutenant Wesley, travel to Ramitelli to thank their saviors, the Texas-born Butler refuses to believe that Lee and Roberts are those men. Butler's crew again find themselves under the 99th's protection on their next mission, but Roberts is killed while defending the bombers. Having gained a new respect for the Tuskegee pilots, Butler specifically requests that they escort his group at his next briefing, saying he won't settle for anyone else. While informing Lee of this development, Colonel Davis reveals some unexpected news; Lee has been promoted to captain, as well as awarded the Distinguished Flying Cross for sinking the destroyer. Lee reflects on how far he's come, as well as those lost along the way, before leading the 99th into the skies.

== Cast ==
Actor	Role
Laurence Fishburne	Captain Hannibal "Iowa" Lee Jr.
Allen Payne	Cadet Walter Peoples
Malcolm-Jamal Warner	Lieutenant Leroy Cappy
Courtney B. Vance	Second Lieutenant Glenn
Andre Braugher	Colonel Benjamin O. Davis Jr.
Christopher McDonald	Major Sherman Joy
Daniel Hugh Kelly	Colonel Rogers
John Lithgow	Senator Conyers
Cuba Gooding Jr.	Lieutenant Billy "A-Train" Roberts
Mekhi Phifer	Cadet Lewis Johns
Vivica Fox	Charlene
Bennet Guillory	Hannibal's father
Tim Kelleher	B-17 Lieutenant Wesley
Ed Lauter	General Stevenson
Janet MacLachlan	Hannibal's mother
Rosemary Murphy	Eleanor Roosevelt
Marco Perella	Colonel Sirca
Ned Vaughn	B-17 Captain Butler

== Production ==
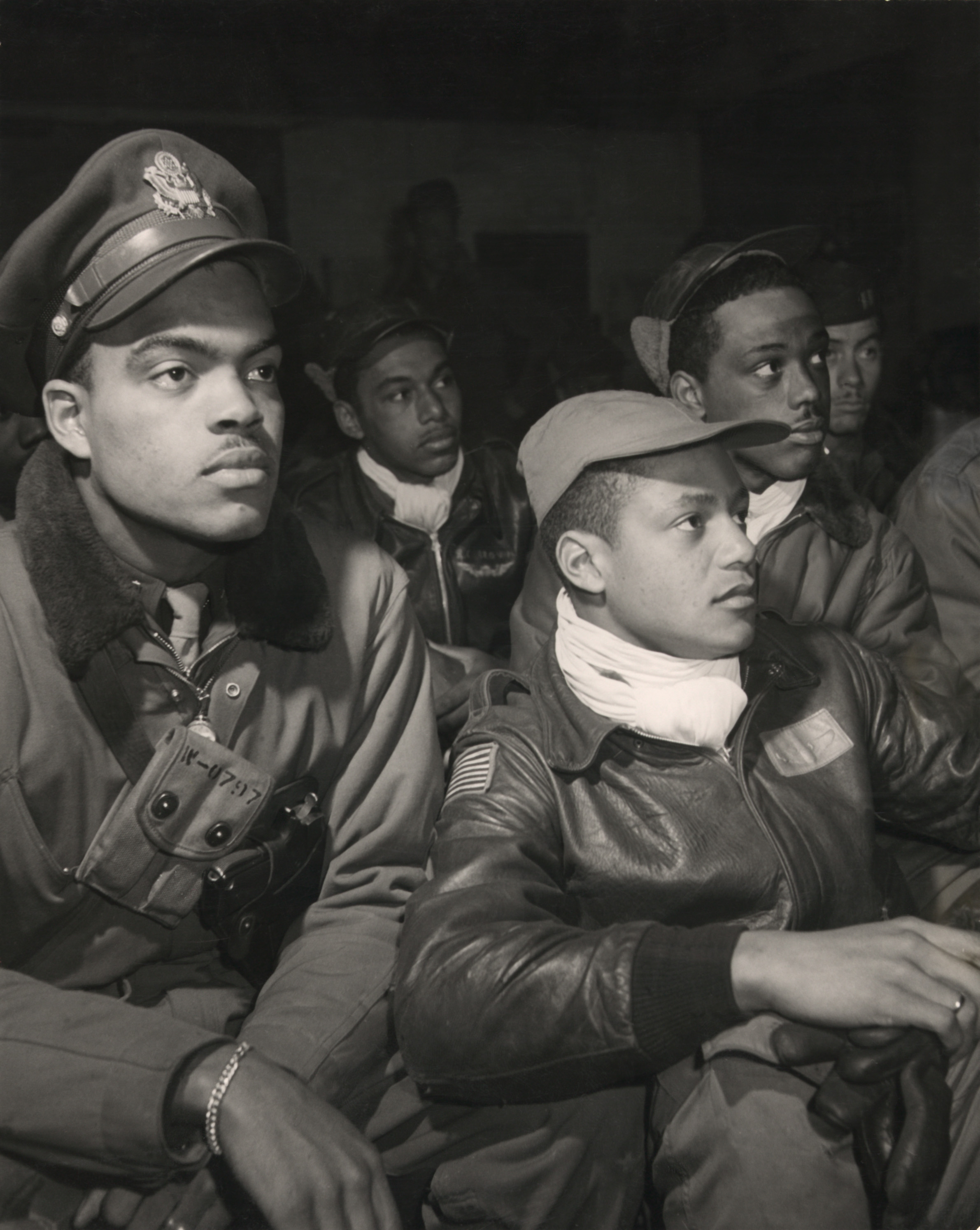
Robert W. Williams (left) and other Tuskegee Airmen at a briefing in Ramitelli, Italy (March 1945)

Screenshot from the film

Ottumwa, Iowa, native, Captain Robert W. Williams, a wartime pilot in the U.S. Army Air Corps' "332nd Fighter Group", the all African-American combat unit trained at Moton Field in Tuskegee, Alabama, wrote a manuscript years earlier, and worked with screenwriter T. S. Cook to create a screenplay originally intended for a feature-film project. The plot combined fact and fiction to create an essentially historically accurate drama. Linking up with Frank Price, owner of Price Productions in 1985 finally gained some traction for the project, and when financing was eventually obtained nearly 10 years later, Williams stayed on as co-executive producer with Price as executive producer. Originally intended as a HBO made-for-TV project, the network invested more into the production, a reputed $8.5 million (the largest investment in a telefilm project to date) striving for historical accuracy. Although most of the lead characters were fictitious composites of real pilots, the inclusion of First Lady Eleanor Roosevelt and General Benjamin "B.O." Davis was based on actual events. When Roosevelt visited Tuskegee Army Air Field in 1941, she insisted on flying with C. Alfred "Chief" Anderson, the first African American to earn his pilot's license and the first flight instructor of the Civilian Pilot Training Program organized at the Tuskegee Institute. She had the photograph of her in a training aircraft with a black pilot at the controls widely circulated. Other than some differences in physical appearance and profile, Andre Braugher's portrayal of "B.O." Davis and his role as the commanding officer pointedly was an accurate depiction of the unit's first commander's personality and character.

Location shooting took place at Fort Chaffee, right outside of Fort Smith, Arkansas. The barracks had been used in the filming of Biloxi Blues (1988), another wartime story. The principal photography also used locations at Juliette, Georgia and Muskogee, Oklahoma, as well as studio work in Los Angeles. A collection of period aircraft including North American T-6 Texans and North American P-51 Mustangs was representative of the many types flown by the Tuskegee Airmen. A few authentic P-51 fighter aircraft in appropriate "red tail" colors were employed in the aerial sequences.

In addition, some period gun-ciné films were also used, as were sequences from the films, Memphis Belle (1990) and Battle of Britain (1969). The producers also borrowed a technique used in Memphis Belle by using cutout silhouettes of aircraft to make more aircraft parked at the various airfields apparent. One example of period dialogue that was faithful to the times was Hannibal Lee Jr. (another fictitious composite) singing: "Straighten up..." finished by Billy Roberts (fictional character): "...and fly right." (The catchphrase was derived from the 1944 top-40 hit record, "Straighten Up and Fly Right" by the King Cole Trio led by Nat King Cole.)

== Reception ==
Although originally released on cable, the HBO feature was shown on multiple repeats and eventually was released as a limited feature in selected theaters. In 2001, a home video/DVD version was also released in both formats. The transfer was done in 1.78:1 aspect ratio, which exactly fills a 16x9 display, and is anamorphically enhanced.

Criticism of the movie was generally focused on clichéd dialogue and slow, stagy scenes, but the overall impression by the public was mostly favorable.

=== Awards and nominations ===
Year	Award	Category	Nominee(s)	Result	Ref.
1995	Peabody Awards		HBO Pictures and Price Entertainment	Won	
1996	American Cinema Editors Awards	Best Edited Motion Picture for Non-Commercial Television	David Beatty	Nominated	
1996	CableACE Awards	Movie or Miniseries		Nominated	
1996	CableACE Awards	Actor in a Movie or Miniseries	Laurence Fishburne	Nominated	
1996	CableACE Awards	Supporting Actor in a Movie or Miniseries	Andre Braugher	Nominated	
1996	Directors Guild of America Awards	Outstanding Directorial Achievement in Dramatic Specials	Robert Markowitz	Nominated	
1996	Golden Globe Awards	Best Actor in a Miniseries or Motion Picture Made for Television	Laurence Fishburne	Nominated	
1996	NAACP Image Awards	Outstanding Television Movie or Mini-Series		Won	
1996	NAACP Image Awards	Outstanding Actor in a Television Movie or Mini-Series	Andre Braugher	Nominated	
1996	NAACP Image Awards	Outstanding Actor in a Television Movie or Mini-Series	Laurence Fishburne	Won	
1996	NAACP Image Awards	Outstanding Actor in a Television Movie or Mini-Series	Cuba Gooding Jr.	Nominated	
1996	Primetime Emmy Awards	Outstanding Made for Television Movie	Frank Price, Robert Wayland Williams, Bill Carraro, and Carol Bahoric	Nominated	
1996	Primetime Emmy Awards	Outstanding Lead Actor in a Miniseries or a Special	Laurence Fishburne	Nominated	
1996	Primetime Emmy Awards	Outstanding Supporting Actor in a Miniseries or a Special	Andre Braugher	Nominated	
1996	Primetime Emmy Awards	Outstanding Writing for a Miniseries or a Special	Paris Qualles, Trey Ellis, Ron Hutchinson, Robert Wayland Williams, and T. S. Cook	Nominated	
1996	Primetime Emmy Awards	Outstanding Casting for a Miniseries or a Special	Robi Reed-Humes	Won (Note: Tied with Mary Colquhoun for Truman.)	
1996	Primetime Emmy Awards	Outstanding Editing for a Miniseries or a Special – Single Camera Production	David Beatty	Won	
1996	Primetime Emmy Awards	Outstanding Music Composition for a Miniseries or a Special	Lee Holdridge	Nominated	
1996	Primetime Emmy Awards	Outstanding Sound Editing for a Miniseries or a Special	G. Michael Graham, Joe Melody, Anton Holden, Bob Costanza, Tim Terusa, Mike Dickeson, Mark Steele, Darren Wright, Michael Lyle, Gary Macheel, John K. Adams, Richard Steele, Mark Friedgen, Billy B. Bell, Kristi Johns, Stan Jones, Mark Heyes, Jill Schachne, and Tim Chilton	Won	
1996	Primetime Emmy Awards	Outstanding Sound Mixing for a Drama Miniseries or a Special	Veda Campbell, Wayne Artman, Robert L. Harman, and Nick Alphin	Nominated	
1996	Primetime Emmy Awards	Outstanding Special Visual Effects	Michael Muscal, Fred Cramer, Ray McIntyre Jr., and David Fiske	Nominated	
1996	Screen Actors Guild Awards	Outstanding Performance by a Male Actor in a Television Movie or Miniseries	Laurence Fishburne	Nominated	

== Historical accuracy ==
Besides the character of Colonel Benjamin O. Davis Jr. (who is actually among the attendees during the wing-pinning ceremony scene) played by Andre Braugher, no other actual real-life Tuskegee Airmen were portrayed in this film. Other featured Tuskegee Airmen characters are composites of the men with whom Williams served.

At one point, the character Lewis Johns (Mekhi Phifer) recites "Strange Fruit" to the other recruits in their barracks. "Strange Fruit" is a song recorded by Billie Holiday in 1939, inspired by a poem by Abel Meeropol after he witnessed the lynching of Thomas Shipp and Abram Smith.

At the end, the film details the unit's accomplishments: 66 of the 450 Tuskegee Airmen died in battle, they engaged and defeated Messerschmitt Me 262s, the first operational jet fighters, and they were awarded a total of 850 medals over the course of the war. The credits also note (inaccurately, but a common belief of the time) that the 332nd never lost a single bomber to enemy fighters. This claim is a source of historical controversy. The statement was repeated for many years and not challenged because of the esteem of the Tuskegee Airmen. However, Air Force records and eyewitness accounts later showed that at least 25 bombers were lost to enemy fire. This was, however, still an excellent loss-to-enemy fire ratio; the average for other P-51 fighter groups of the Fifteenth Air Force was 46 bombers lost.

== See also ==
- Fly, a 2009 play about the Tuskegee Airmen
- Red Tails, the 2012 George Lucas film on the 332nd Fighter Group
- Wilfred DeFour
- James Clayton Flowers
- George Hardy
- James H. Harvey
- Harry Stewart Jr.
