= James H. Harvey =

American Tuskegee Airman fighter pilot (born 1923)

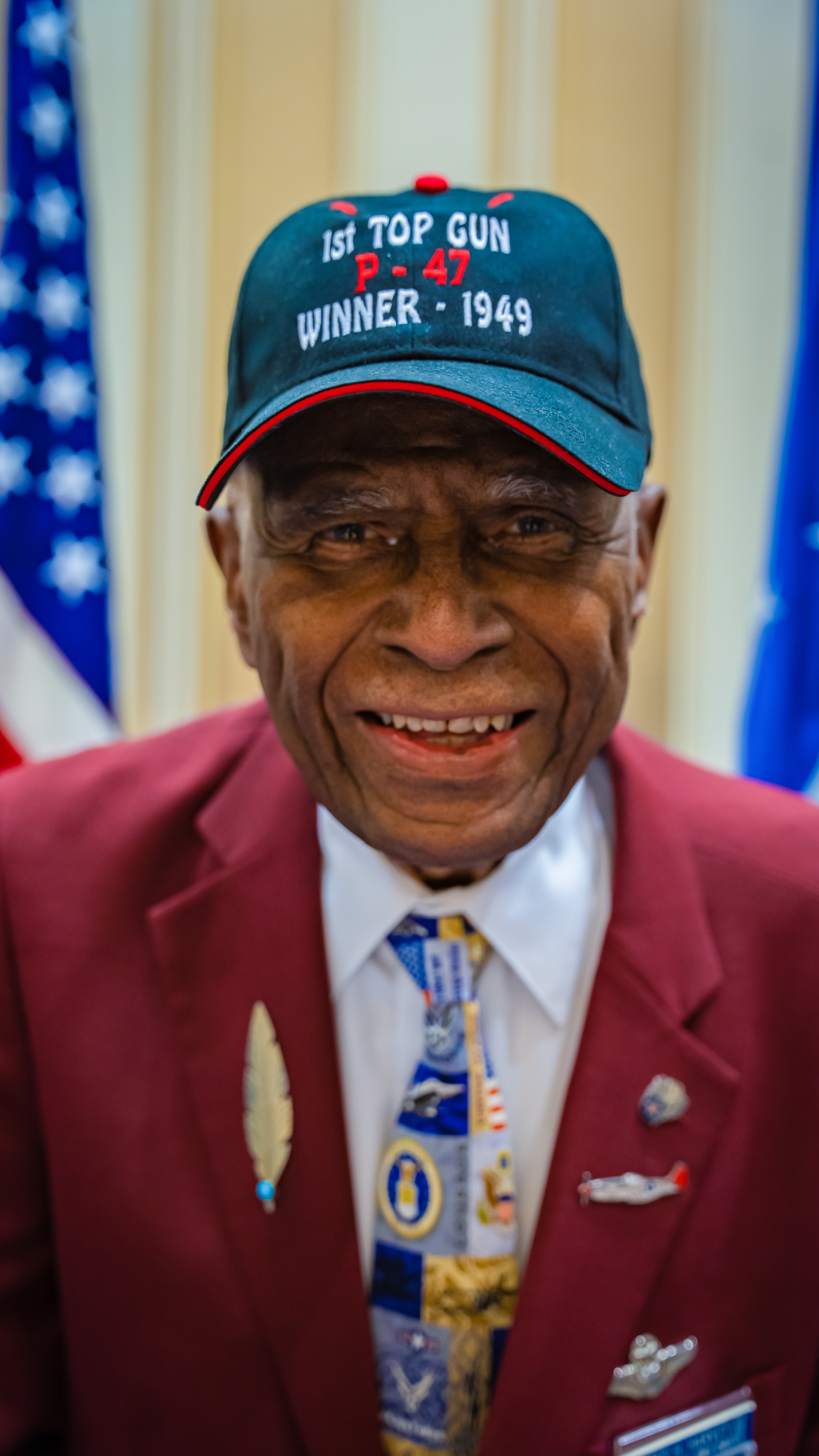
- Harvey in September 2021
- Born: July 13, 1923 (age 103); Montclair, New Jersey, U.S.
- Military career
- Allegiance: United States
- Branch: United States Army Air Force (1943–1947); United States Air Force (1947–1965)
- Service years: 1943–1965
- Rank: Colonel
- Unit: 332nd Fighter Group
- Conflicts: World War II; Korean War
- Awards: Distinguished Flying Cross; Air Medal (11); Congressional Gold Medal

James Henry Harvey III (born July 13, 1923) is a retired African American United States Army Air Corps/United States Air Force (USAF) officer and former fighter pilot. He served with the 99th Fighter Squadron of the 332nd Fighter Group—best known as the Tuskegee Airmen, "Red Tails" or, among enemy German pilots, Schwarze Vogelmenschen ("Black birdmen"). He is one of the 1,007 documented Tuskegee Airmen pilots.

Harvey is best known as the first African American USAF jet fighter pilot to fly combat operations in the Korean War. Harvey and his 332nd Fighter Group Weapons pilot team won the USAF's inaugural "Top Gun" team competition in 1949. Along with every member of the Tuskegee Airmen, he received the Congressional Gold Medal in 2006.

== Early life and education ==
James Henry Harvey III was born in Montclair, New Jersey, on July 13, 1923. He was the son of James Harvey and Cornelia Harvey. Harvey had three younger siblings: brother Charles and sisters Dorothy and Cornelia.

Harvey attended primary school in Silver Lake, Essex County, New Jersey, and Montclair, New Jersey. In 1930, his family moved from Montclair to Wilkes-Barre, Pennsylvania. In 1936, the Harveys moved to Nuangola Station in Northeastern Pennsylvania, where they were the sole African American family in the area. Harvey attended high school in Mountain Top, Pennsylvania. An excellent student, he served as President of his senior class, anchor man on the tumbling team, captain of the basketball team, and was class valedictorian.

== World War II military career ==
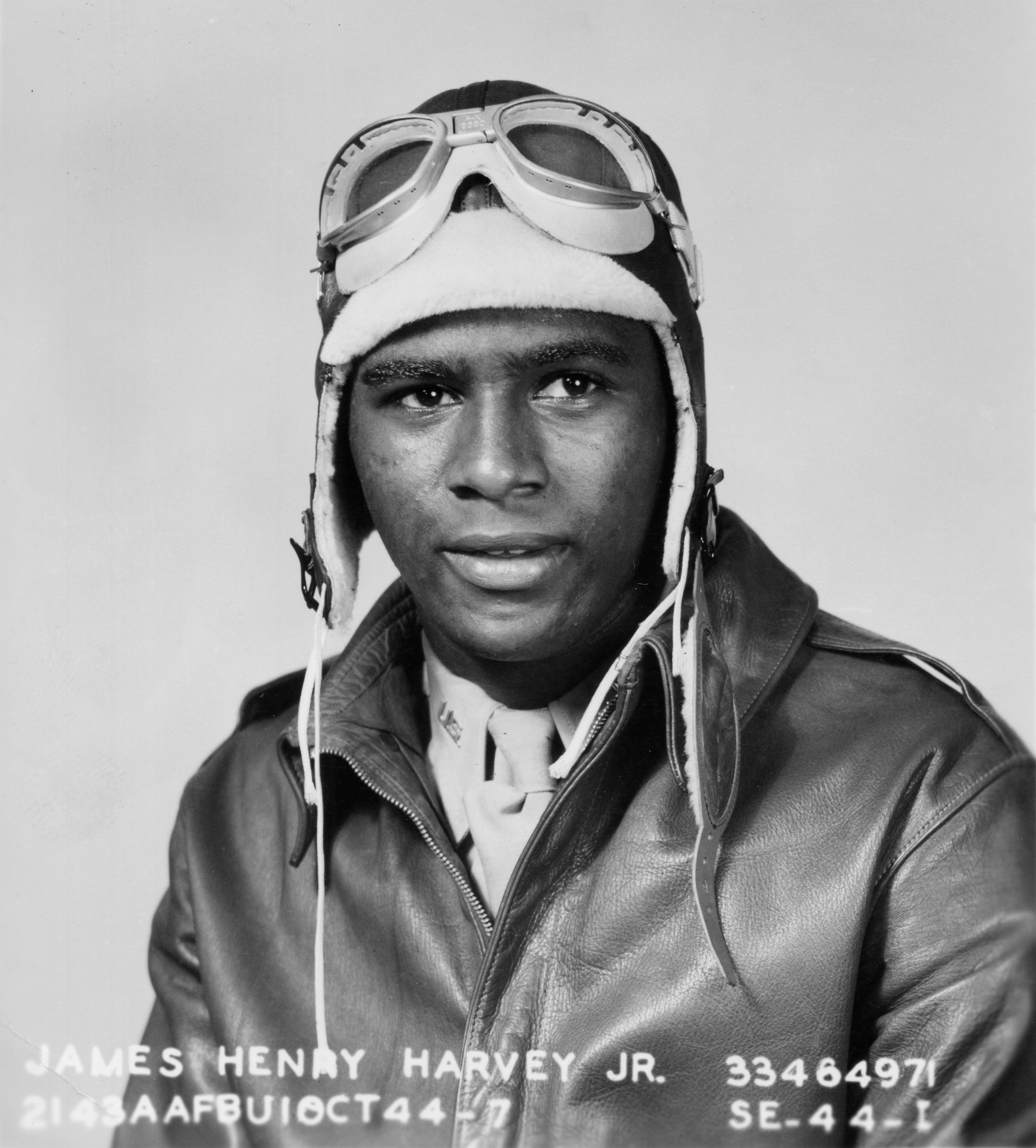
Official U.S. Army Air Forces portrait (1944)

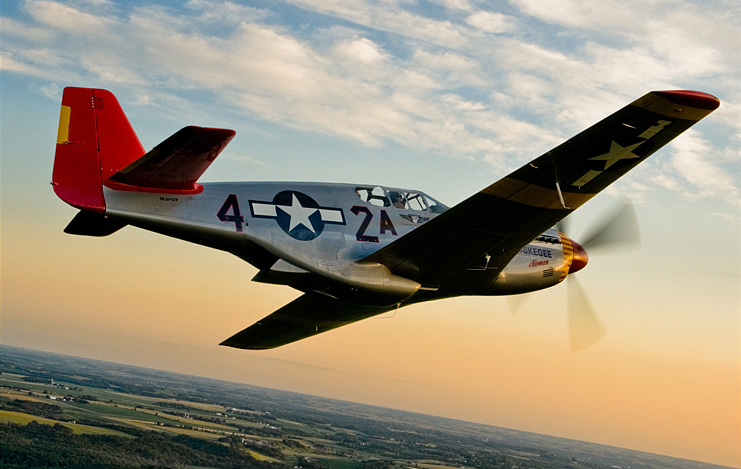
P-51 aircraft with red markings. (Note: The Tuskegee Airmen became known for flying P-51 aircraft with red markings. These included red bands on the noses and red rudders; their P-51B and D Mustangs flew with similar color schemes, with red propeller spinners, yellow wing bands, and all-red tail surfaces.)

Harvey attempted to enlist with the United States Army Air Corps in January 1943 but was turned down because of his race. He was instead drafted into the United States Army in April 1943, and was initially assigned to the United States Army Air Corps as an engineer. After applying for the Aviation Cadet Program, Harvey took the cadet training exam at Bolling Field and was admitted to the Tuskegee Flight School's Aviation Cadet Training Program. After attending basic training in Biloxi, Mississippi, for 30 days, he was transferred to Tuskegee Army Airfield to begin pilot training. On October 16, 1944, Harvey graduated from the Tuskegee Flight Program Army Air as a member of Class 44–4, receiving both his wings and a commission as second lieutenant flying officer. In April 1945, he completed combat training in Walterboro, South Carolina, at Walterboro Army Airfield, where over 500 Tuskegee Airmen trained as replacement pilots for the 332nd Fighter Group and the entire 447th Bombardment Group until the base closed in October 1945.

The United States Army Air Forces assigned Harvey to 99th Fighter Squadron as a unit of the 477 Composite Group at Godman Army Airfield at Fort Knox, Kentucky. The 99th Fighter Squadron had just been disbanded at Ramitelli Air Base in Italy and reestablished with two of the four squadrons of the former 477th Bomb Group (medium), the 617th and 618th squadrons. The 616th and 619th squadrons were disbanded at Freeman Army Airfield in Seymour, Indiana after the Freeman Field Mutiny and the men were returned to Godman Field. Harvey did not engage in combat during World War II as the war had ended in Europe as he was awaiting transportation to deploy to Ramitelli. He remained with the 99th Fighter Squadron when the unit was moved to Lockbourne Army Airfield in March, 1946 and remained there until the 332nd Fighter Group was disbanded there upon desegregation of the USAF and US military in July, 1949 about a month after the 332nd won the conventional portion of the 1949 USAF Gunnery Meet held at Las Vegas Army Airfield, Nevada.

== Winner of the 1949 Top Gun Competition ==
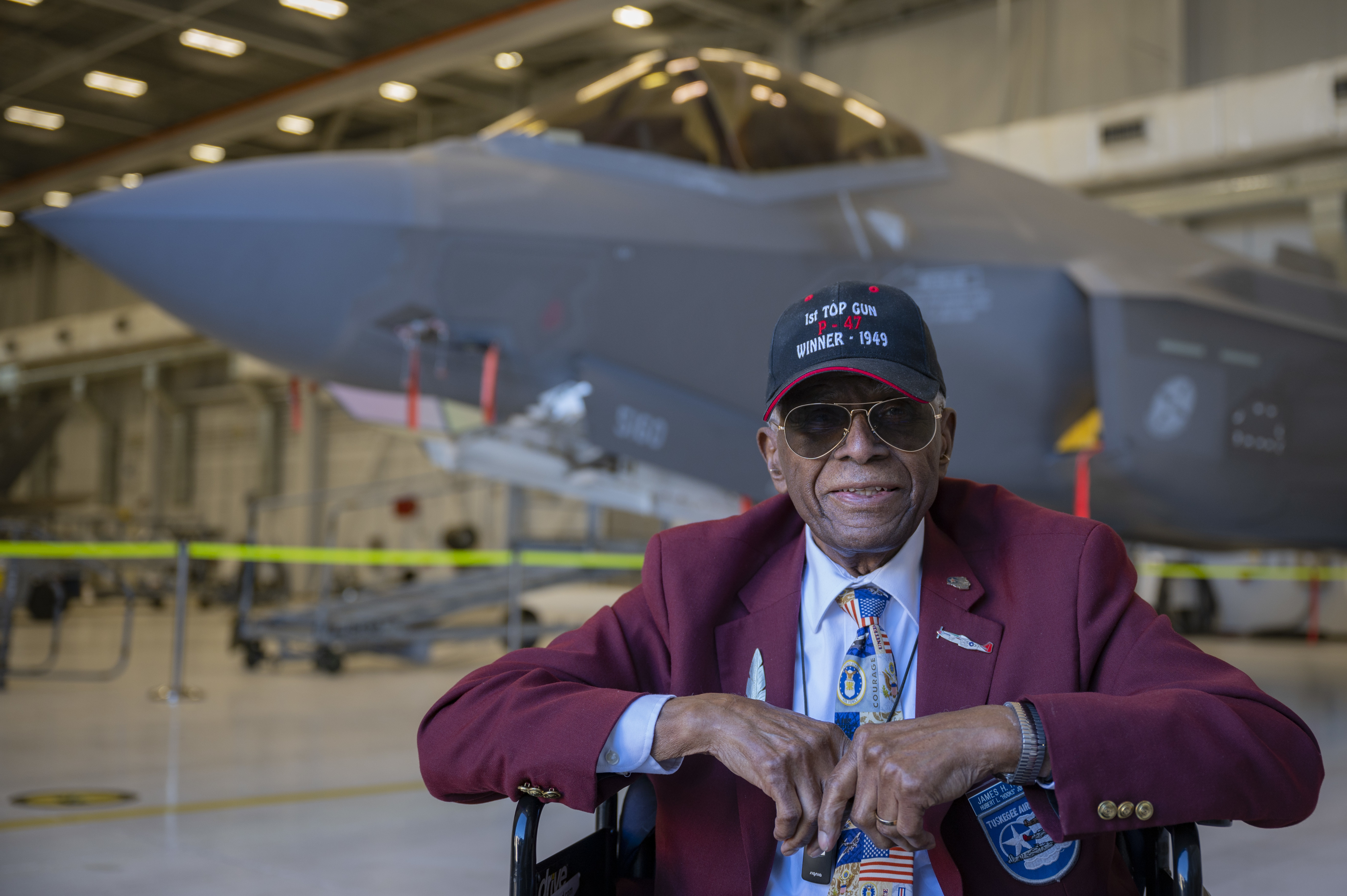
Harvey admires an F-35 Lightning II at Nellis Air Force Base on January 10, 2022. He was honored the next day with the unveiling of a plaque commissioned to reaffirm the accomplishments of the 332nd Fighter Group in their historic 1949 Top Gun Competition victory.

In January 1949, the Chief of Staff of the United States Air Force sent out a directive to each Air Force group requesting their participation in an aerial weapons competition. Four months later, in May 1949, Harvey represented the 332nd Fighter Group as a member a four-member pilot team to compete at the U.S. Air Force's inaugural Top Gun Competition held at the Las Vegas Air Force Base (now Nellis Air Force Base). A grueling 10-day event, the competition comprised six events: aerial gunnery at 20,000 feet, aerial gunnery at 12,000 feet, dive bombing, skip bombing, rocketing firing, and panel strafing. His team led from start to finish.

Harvey's 332nd Fighter Group team included the 100th Squadron's First Lieutenant Harry Stewart Jr., the 301st Squadron's Captain Alva Temple, 99th Squadron's First Lieutenant Halbert Alexander (who served as an alternate pilot), and Staff Sergeant Buford A. Johnson as aircraft crew chief. Harvey and his team competed in P-47N Thunderbolts and won against other competing U.S. Air Force fighter group teams in far more advanced aircraft.

The results of the 1949 Top Gun Competition, and a three-foot-high silver trophy—stashed in a Wright-Patterson Air Force Base Museum storage area for 55 years—were absent from the Air Force archives until 1995. Harvey remarked: "They knew who won, but did not want to recognize us." In 2004 the trophy was put on display at the National Museum of the United States Air Force. Harvey was honored at a ceremony on January 11, 2022, when a plaque honoring the 332nd Fighter Group's victory in the first Top Gun Competition was installed at Nellis Air Force Base.

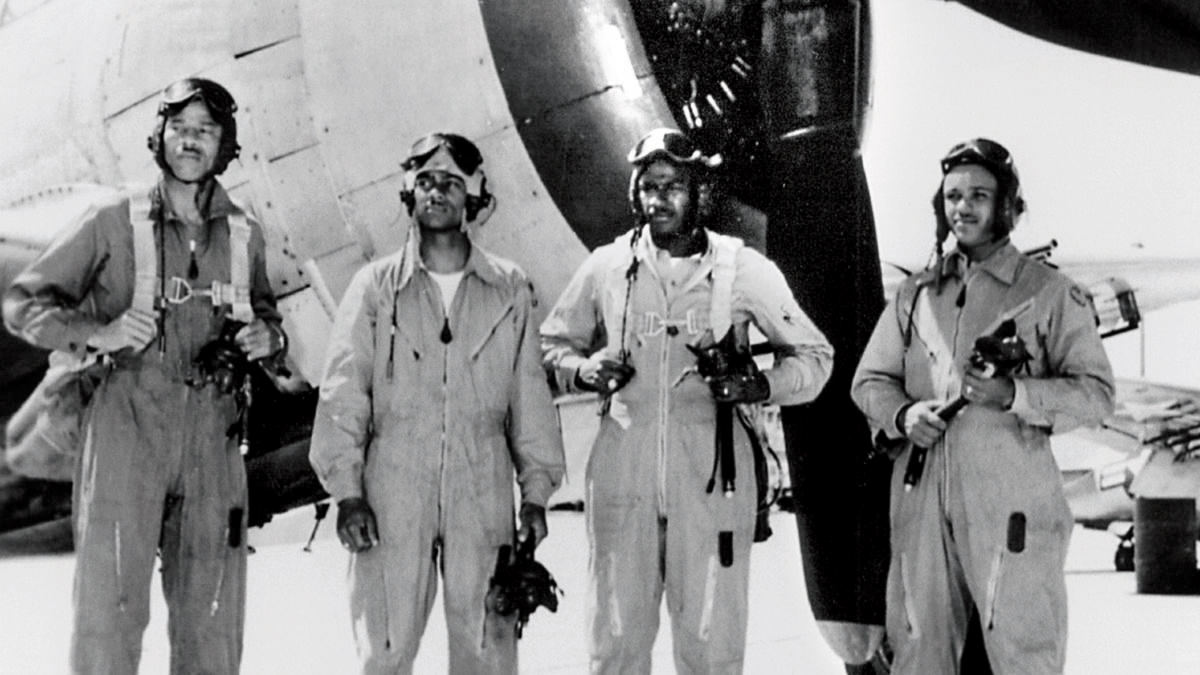
Temple, Stewart, Harvey and Alexander after winning the 1949 Fighter Gunnery Competition

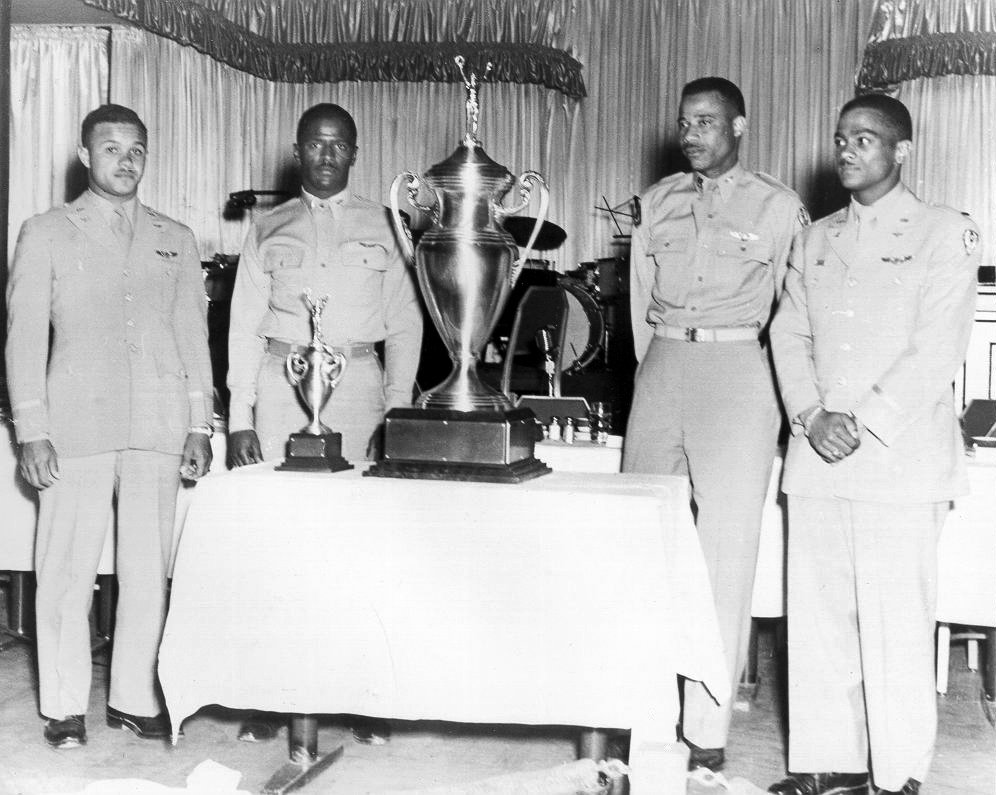
Alexander, Harvey, Temple and Stewart at the awards ceremony

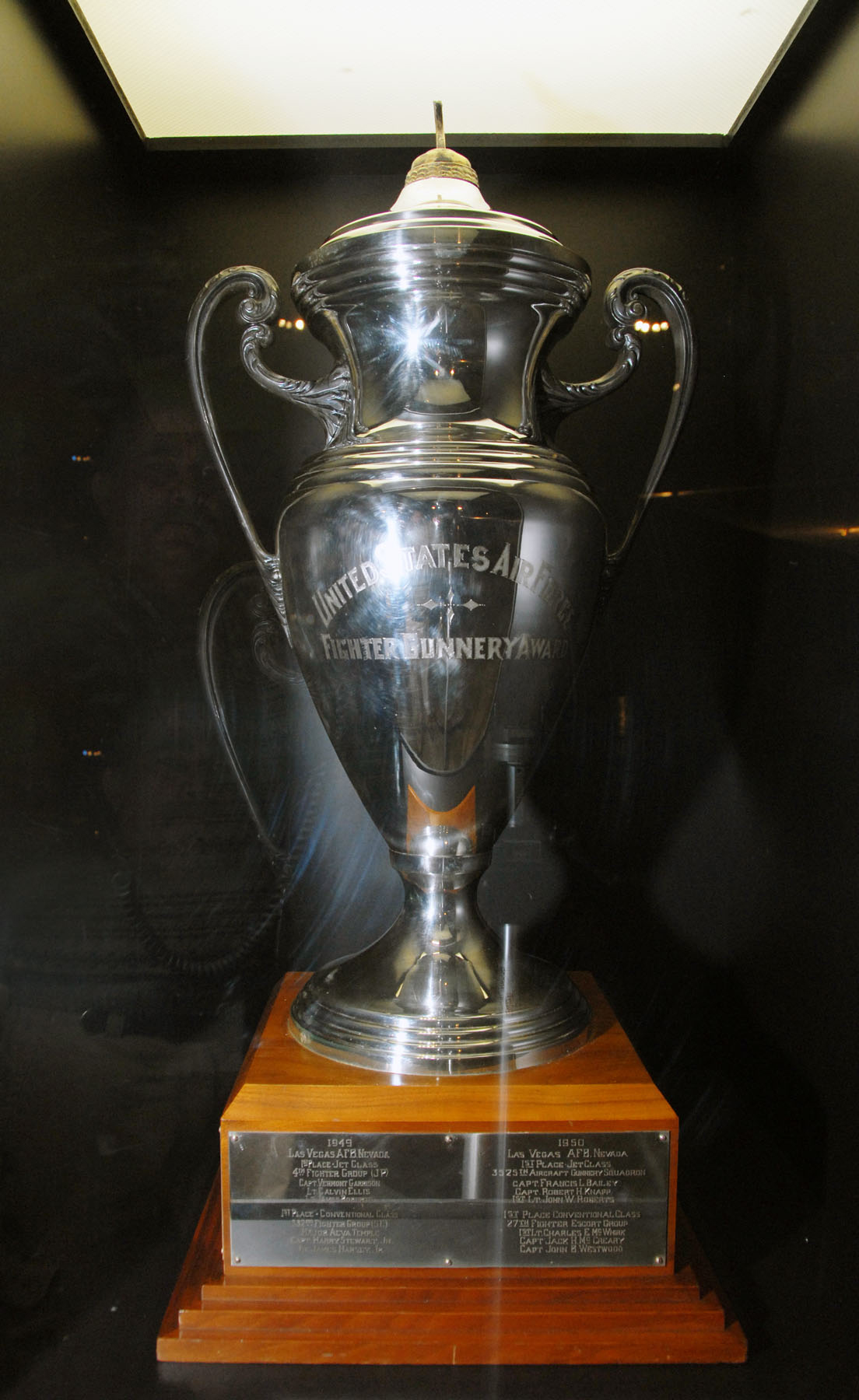
Trophy on display in 2011

== Later career and retirement ==
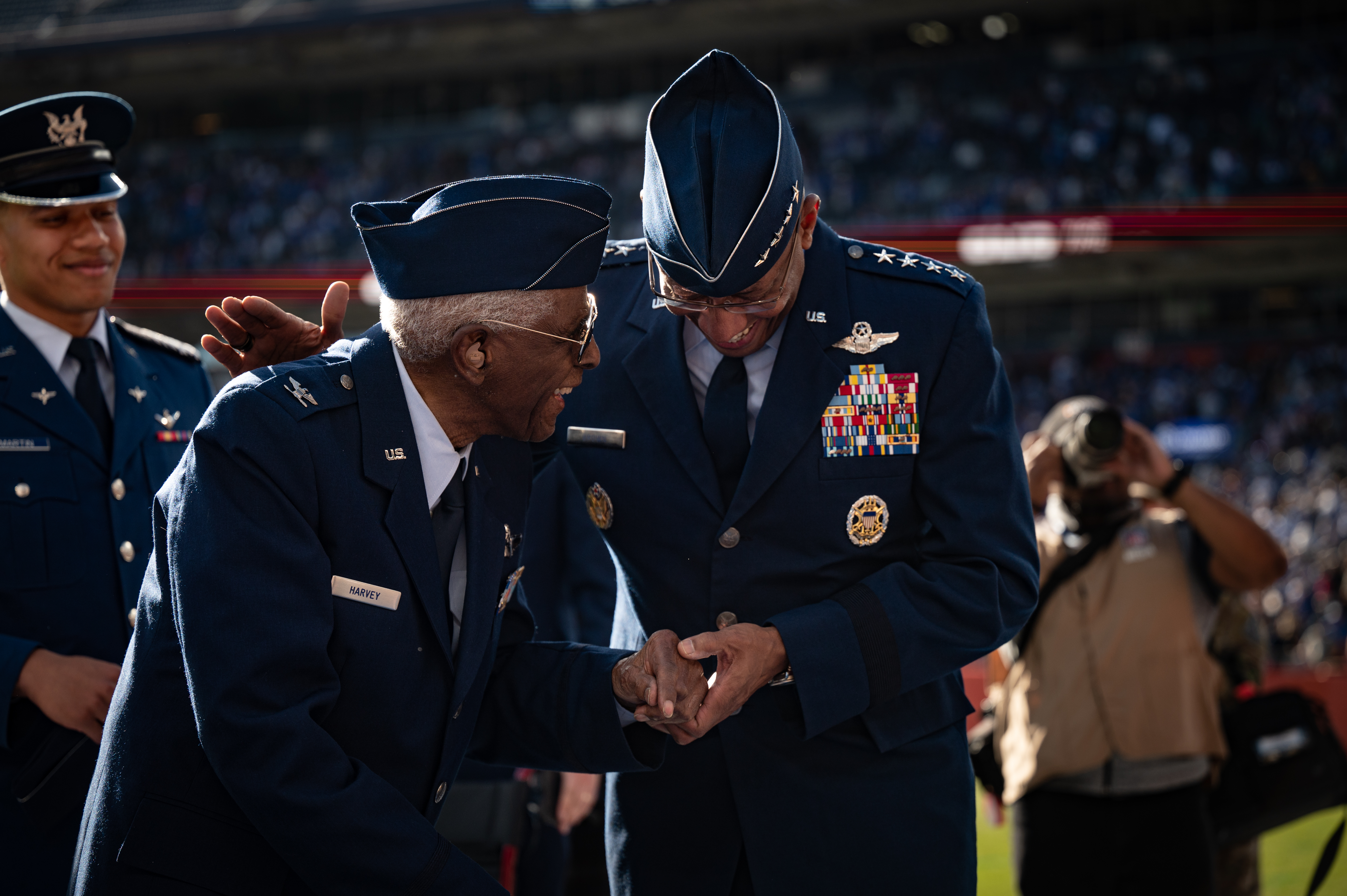
James Harvey and Charles Q. Brown Jr., 21st chairman of the Joint Chiefs of Staff, during an Air Force Academy football game in Denver on November 4, 2023

In 1949, Harvey and fellow Tuskegee Airman Edward P. Drummond Jr. were transferred from Lockbourne AFB, Ohio to an F-80 squadron at the Misawa Air Base in Japan as a Fighter Pilot and Flight Commander. Harvey became the first African American jet fighter pilot to engage in combat during the Korean War. Harvey was awarded the Distinguished Flying Cross for leading four F-80s amidst bad weather conditions during a bomber support mission on October 16, 1950, near Yongsan, Korea (now the Yongsan District in Seoul, South Korea), inflicting heavy damage on an enemy encampment. Harvey flew 140 missions in Korea, and was awarded several Air Medals.

After the Korean War, Harvey served in multiple roles. In 1951, Harvey served as the Assistant Operations Officer, Instrument Instructor Pilot and Aircraft Test Pilot in the 94th Fighter Interceptor Squadron at George Air Force Base in California. In 1955, Harvey served as the Flying Safety Officer of the 27th NORAD Region, Norton AFB in California, receiving the Flight Rating of "Command Pilot". In 1956, Harvey became the Fighter Training Officer of North Eastern Air Command Headquarters at Pepperrell AFB in Newfoundland. In 1959, Harvey served as the Assistant Group Operations Officer of the 1st Fighter Group and the Operations Officer of the 71st Fighter Interceptor Squadron flying F-102 aircraft at Selfridge AFB in Michigan. In 1961, Harvey was assigned to Headquarters 30th NORAD Region, Truax Field, Wisconsin as a Weapons Director Staff Officer and later as Battle Staff Training Officer for the Commanding General and his staff. Harvey retired as a Lieutenant Colonel on March 31, 1965. He served a combined 22 years in the United States Army Air Corps and the United States Air Force.

On June 7, 1965, American meat and cold cut production company Oscar Mayer hired Harvey as a corporate salesman, relocating his family of four girls across the U.S. In April 1972, Oscar Mayer transferred Harvey to Denver, Colorado, where he lives today. He retired from Oscar Mayer in 1980.

Harvey turned 103 on July 13, 2026. During the halftime ceremony of the Air Force vs. Army football game on November 4, 2023, at Empower Field in Denver, Harvey received an honorary promotion to the rank of Colonel.

== Military awards ==
Harvey earned the following awards during his 22-year career in the United States Army Air Corps/U.S. Air Force:

- Distinguished Flying Cross
- Air Medal with 10 Oak Leaf Clusters
- Congressional Gold Medal Awarded to Tuskegee Airmen in 2006.
- Distinguished Unit Citation with 10 Oak Leaf Clusters
- Good Conduct Medal
- American Campaign Medal
- World War II Victory Medal
- Army of Occupation Medal
- National Defense Service Medal
- Korean Service Medal with 2 Bronze Stars
- Air Force Longevity Service Award ribbon with 4 Bronze Oak Leaf Clusters
- Air Force Reserve Medal
- Presidential Unit Citation (South Korea)
- United Nations Service Medal

On March 29, 2007, Harvey — along with every member of the Tuskegee Airmen — was awarded the Congressional Gold Medal.

== Aircraft flown ==
During his 22-year career, Harvey flew the following aircraft:

- Curtiss P-40 Warhawk
- Republic P-47 Thunderbolt
- North American P-51 Mustang
- Lockheed P-80 Shooting Star
- North American F-86 Sabre
- North American F-86D Sabre
- Northrop F-89 Scorpion
- Lockheed F-94 Starfire
- Lockheed T-33
- Convair F-102 Delta Dagger

== See also ==
- Dogfights (TV series)
- Executive Order 9981
- List of Tuskegee Airmen Cadet Pilot Graduation Classes
- List of Tuskegee Airmen
- Military history of African Americans
- The Tuskegee Airmen (1995)
