= Shiloh, Gregg County, Texas =

Unincorporated community in Texas, US

Coordinates: 32°34′19″N 94°51′44″W

Shiloh is an unincorporated farming community on Shiloh Road near White Oak in north central Gregg County, Texas, United States. Located just south of the Upshur County line, Shiloh was established by former African Americans slaves at the end of the Civil War.

== History ==
The area around Shiloh was a part of Mexico after Mexican Independence in 1821. Many Cherokee families passed through the region during the following decade, having been pushed further west out of their original lands. The Cherokees were forced out of the region by 1839 as many Anglo-Americans arrived in the area as well as some African Americans, some of them enslaved. Through the mid-1800s, the region's main economic activity was cotton farming, and the lumber industry grew after the 1860s.

Shiloh was one of a number of Black communities to be settled in the county in the Reconstruction era. According to local tradition, a formerly enslaved man, Butcher Christian, his former enslaver, Gideon Christian, and a noted post-Civil War church organizer, the Reverend John Baptist, established the Shiloh Baptist Church in 1871. Services began in a log sanctuary located on 3 acres (12,000 m^{2}) donated by Butcher Christian. Gideon Christian, originally from South Carolina, had held thirty-two people enslaved in the area prior to the Civil War. According to the oral histories of local families, the Christian family conveyed land titles to a number of the emancipated people they had formerly held enslaved.

Adjacent to the Baptist Church is an active cemetery with marked graves dating to 1882. The First Presbyterian Church was organized in Shiloh, Gregg County, Texas in 1838, but relocated to Clarksville in 1844.

Shortly after the end of the Civil War, the newly free Black community established a one-room school in Shiloh that operated until the school was destroyed in a major storm in the 1890s. Classes were held in the Shiloh Baptist Church. With funding from the Rosenwald rural school building program, which helped Black communities build schools across the South, the Shiloh community built a new two-room school erected in 1920.

=== Oil Boom Growth and Decline ===
Beginning in the 1930s, an oil boom was the major driver of Gregg County's economy and population growth. Revenue from oil discovered on the Shiloh Baptist Church land was used to build a new sanctuary on the site in 1936. In 1933, the community built a new brick school with an auditorium and separate junior high school wing. The school expanded to include high school in 1937.

By the 1960s, oil was the dominant industry of the region, and few farms remained. Shiloh School closed in 1966, when area schools were desegregated and children from Shiloh enrolled in White Oak Independent School District. The school building was later used for chemical storage until it was damaged in a 1993 chemical fire, possibly a result of arson. The building, on Shiloh Road, is marked by a historical plaque. Shiloh Baptist Church still serves the community with a variety of programs.

Shiloh's population declined after World War II. By the 1990s, the church and some of the early settling families remained, but much of the population had moved away.
