= George Hardy (Tuskegee Airman) =

American Air Force pilot (1925–2025)

Lieutenant Colonel George Hardy
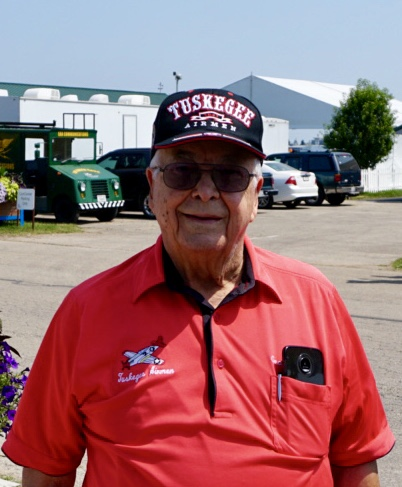
- Hardy in 2019
- Born: George Edward Hardy; June 8, 1925; Philadelphia, Pennsylvania, U.S.
- Died: September 24, 2025 (aged 100); Sarasota, Florida, U.S.
- Spouse: Bonnie Hardy
- Military career
- Allegiance: United States
- Branch: United States Army Air Force
- Service years: 1943–1971
- Rank: Lieutenant Colonel
- Unit: 332nd Fighter Group
- Awards: Distinguished Flying Crosses (2); Congressional Gold Medal; Legion of Merit; Air Medal clusters (13)

George Edward Hardy (June 8, 1925 – September 24, 2025) was an American pilot and military officer. In World War II, Hardy served with the Tuskegee Airmen and flew 21 combat missions. In the Korean War, he flew 45 combat missions as the pilot of a bomber. In the Vietnam War, Hardy flew 70 combat missions piloting an AC-119K gunship.

== Early life ==
George Edward Hardy was born in Philadelphia, Pennsylvania, on June 8, 1925. His parents were Edward Hardy, a podiatrist, and Alma Vargas, a homemaker. He was exposed to racism and segregation growing up in Philadelphia. He graduated high school in 1942 and wanted to join the military because his older brother had joined the U.S. Navy in 1941. When he joined the Army Air Corps in 1943, the U.S. military was segregated. Hardy faced discrimination from commanders in the Army. After WWII (1947) Hardy went to school at New York University School of Engineering and Science until 1948. Hardy wanted to be an engineer; he did not plan to make a career in the Air Force.

== Education ==
Hardy attended Walter George Smith School and graduated from South Philadelphia High School in 1942. He received a Bachelor of Science degree in electrical engineering in 1957 and a Master of Science degree in systems engineering-reliability in 1964, both from the U.S. Air Force Institute of Technology.

== Military service ==
=== World War II ===
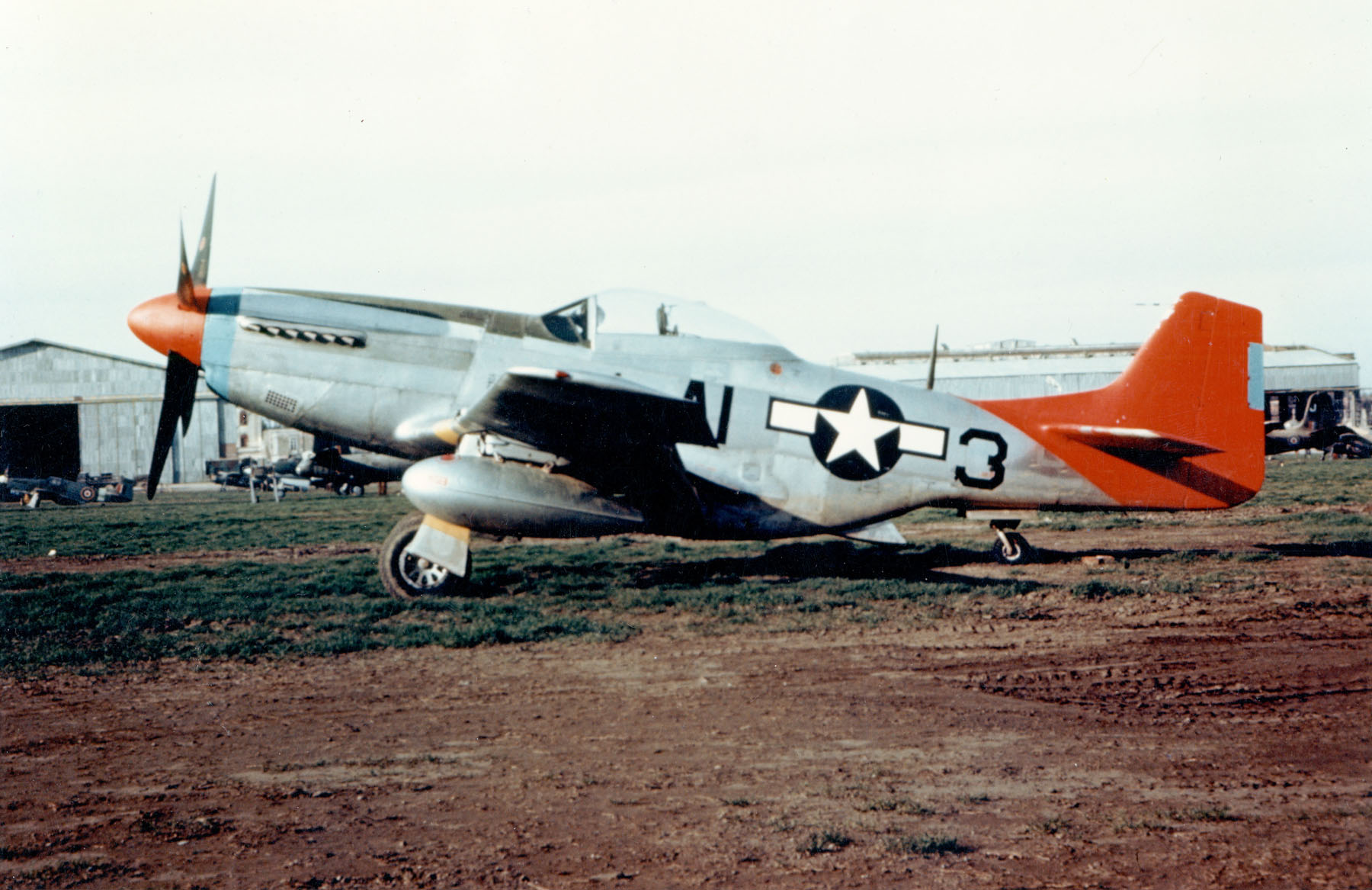
The Tuskegee Airmen's aircraft had distinctive markings that led to the name, "Red Tails". (Note: The red markings that distinguished the Tuskegee Airmen included red bands on the noses of P-51s as well as a red rudder; their P-51B and D Mustangs flew with similar color schemes, with red propeller spinners, yellow wing bands and all-red tail surfaces.)

In 1943 when Hardy was 17, he joined the Army Air Corps and that same year he began training to fly at Tuskegee Army Air Field. He was sent to Keesler Army Air Field in Biloxi, Mississippi, for basic training. He graduated in 1944 as a second lieutenant in the United States Army. He was qualified to fly single-engine fighter planes and was sent to Walterboro Army Air Field in South Carolina to train for combat. He completed his combat training in 1945 and was then sent to Italy. Hardy became one of only about 450 Tuskegee Airmen pilots who were deployed overseas. He flew 21 combat missions over Germany in 1945. The majority of his missions flying the P-51D Mustang were as bomber escort of B-17 and B-24 heavy bombers to their targets. After the war, Hardy went back to Tuskegee to train pilots.

=== Korean War ===
Hardy was recalled to military service in 1948 and sent to Keesler Air Force Base in Mississippi. He was sent to Guam with the 19th Bomb Group. He then was sent to Kadena Air Base, Okinawa: he flew a B-29 and piloted 45 combat missions over Korea. One senior officer, then-Lt Col Fred W. Miller, disliked Hardy because of his race. Miller removed Hardy from a B-29 mission. That B-29 was shot down in North Korean airspace.

On a later assignment, Hardy would report to Miller, who experienced a complete turnaround. Miller would regard Hardy as one of his best commanders.

=== Vietnam War ===
Hardy flew 70 missions piloting an AC-119 gunship during the Vietnam War. He flew missions at night - aided by infrared sensors - to destroy North Vietnamese supply routes and convoys in Laos and Cambodia.

== After service ==
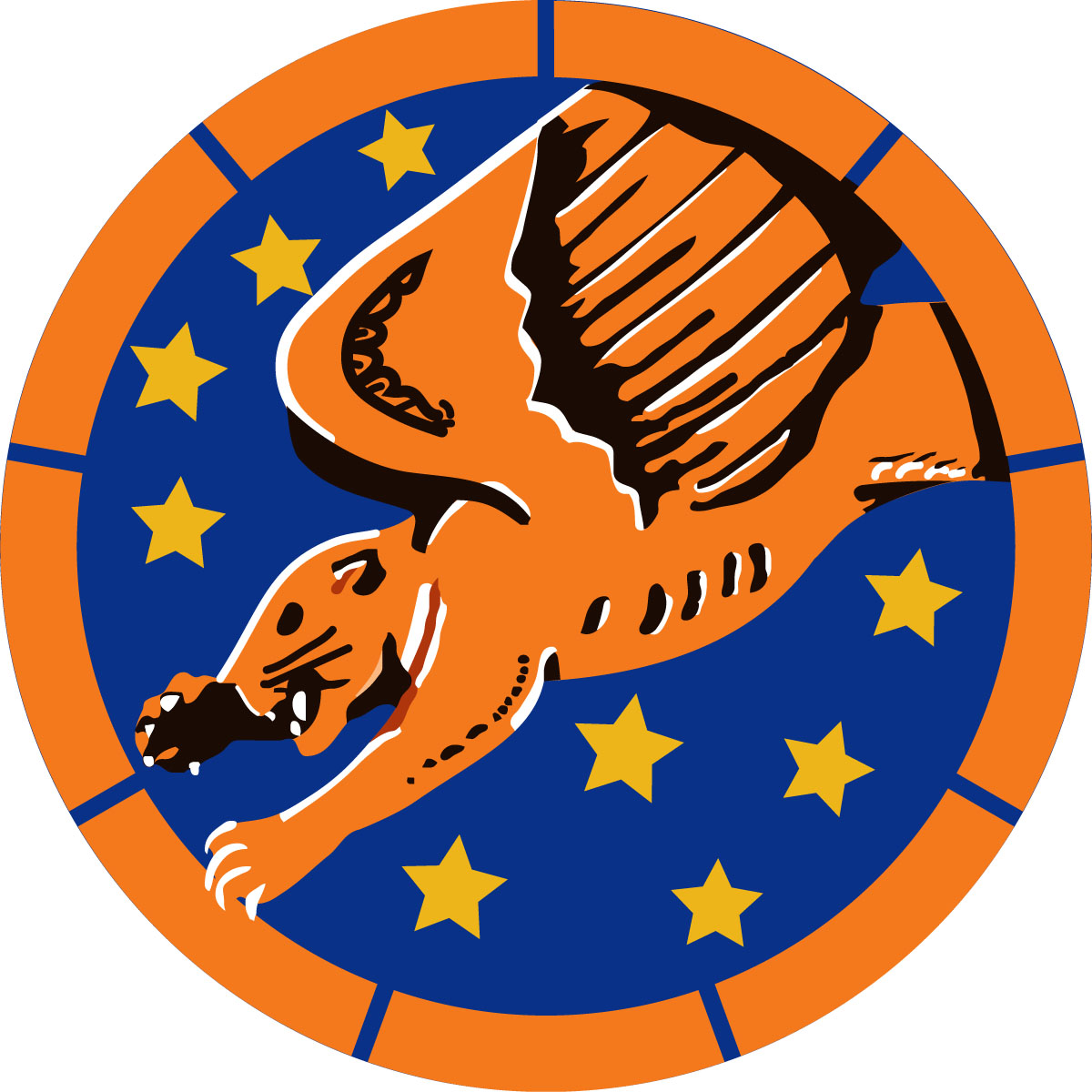
99th Fighter Squadron patch

After retiring from the military at the rank of Lieutenant Colonel, he worked in project management for 18 years for GTE Corporation. Hardy spent much of his retirement traveling throughout the country telling the story of the Tuskegee Airmen and their fight against racial prejudice. He also volunteered at his local church and food pantry.

A P-51D serial number 44-72035 was restored in England to the markings of "Tall in the Saddle", the aircraft that Hardy flew in combat. As of 2026, it still flies at airshows and takes passengers.[17][18]

With the death of LtCol. Harry T. Stewart Jr. on February 2, 2025, at the age of 100, Hardy became the last surviving member of the original Tuskegee Airmen who flew combat missions overseas as a single engine fighter pilot during World War II. He flew with the 99th Fighter Squadron of the "Red Tails" of the 332nd Fighter Group based at Ramitelli AB, Italy. Col. James H. Harvey III, age 103, and Dr. Eugene J. Richardson, age 101, are the two remaining single engined trained Tuskegee Airmen still living as of September, 2026, but they did not serve in combat or overseas during World War II.

Hardy turned 100 on June 8, 2025. He later lived in Sarasota, Florida, and died there on September 24, 2025, at the age of 100.

== Honors and awards ==
Military

- Distinguished Flying Cross with Valor
- Air Medal with 11 Oak Leaf Clusters
- Commendation Medal with one Oak Leaf Cluster.
- Florida Veterans Hall of Fame

Civilian

- Congressional Gold Medal (2007) (Note: Hardy remembered the exact words that George Bush said to the Tuskegee Airmen as he awarded the Congressional Medal: "For most of the salutes you didn't get, I salute you.")
- Tuskegee University – Honorary Doctorate Degree of Public Service (2006)
- South Philadelphia High School Cultural Hall of Fame

== See also ==
- Executive Order 9981
- List of Tuskegee Airmen
- List of Tuskegee Airmen Cadet Pilot Graduation Classes
- Military history of African Americans
