= Military history of African Americans =

Aspect of Black American history

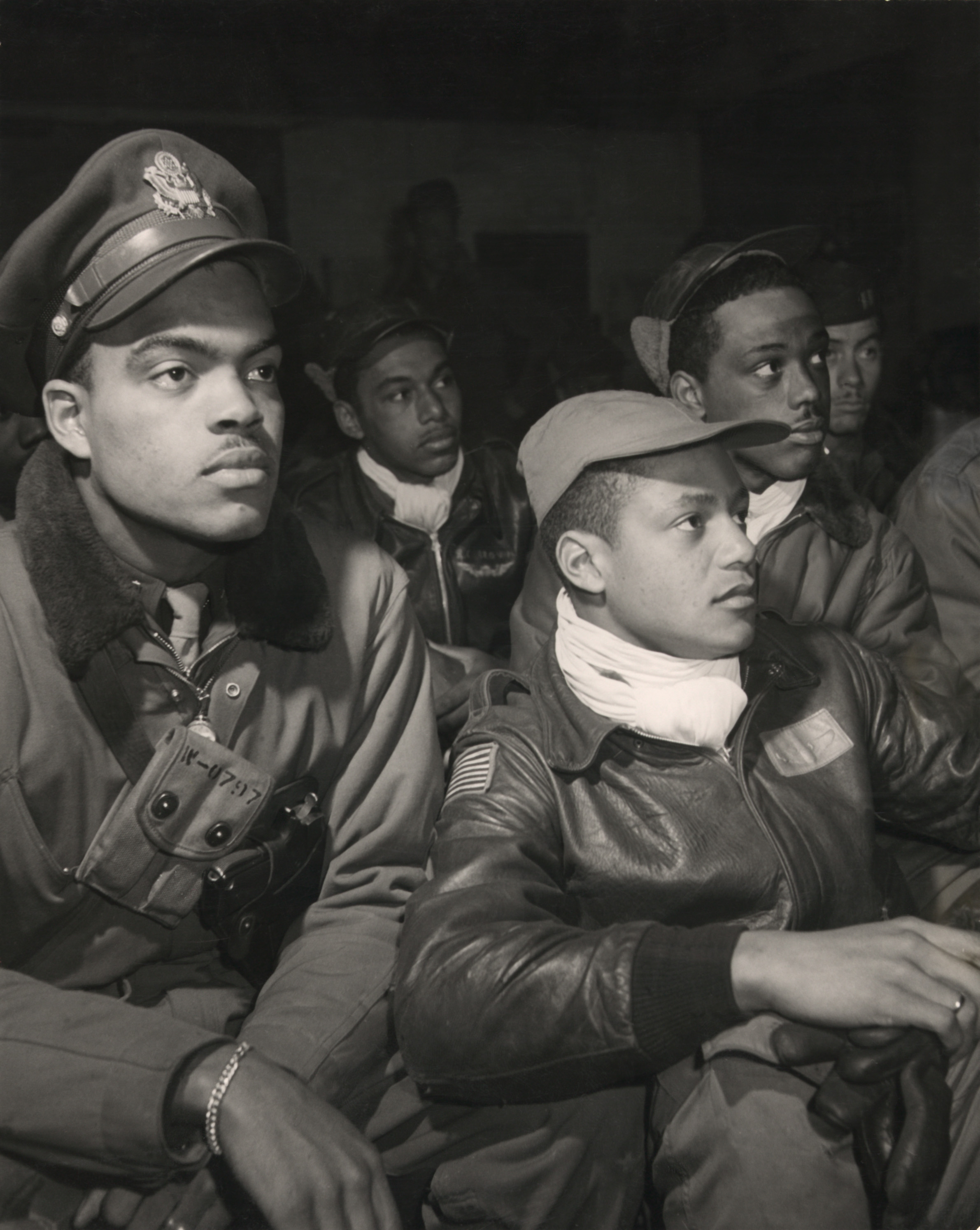
Tuskegee Airmen of the 332nd Fighter Group, United States Army Air Forces (USAAF), attend a briefing at Ramitelli Airfield, Italy, March 1945.

The military history of Black-Americans spans African-American history, the history of the United States and the military history of the United States from the arrival of the first enslaved Africans during the colonial history of the United States to the present day. Black Americans have participated in every war which has been fought either by or within the United States, including the Revolutionary War, the War of 1812, the Mexican–American War, the Civil War, the Spanish–American War, World War I, World War II, the Korean War, the Vietnam War, the Gulf War, the war in Afghanistan, and the Iraq War.

== American Revolution ==
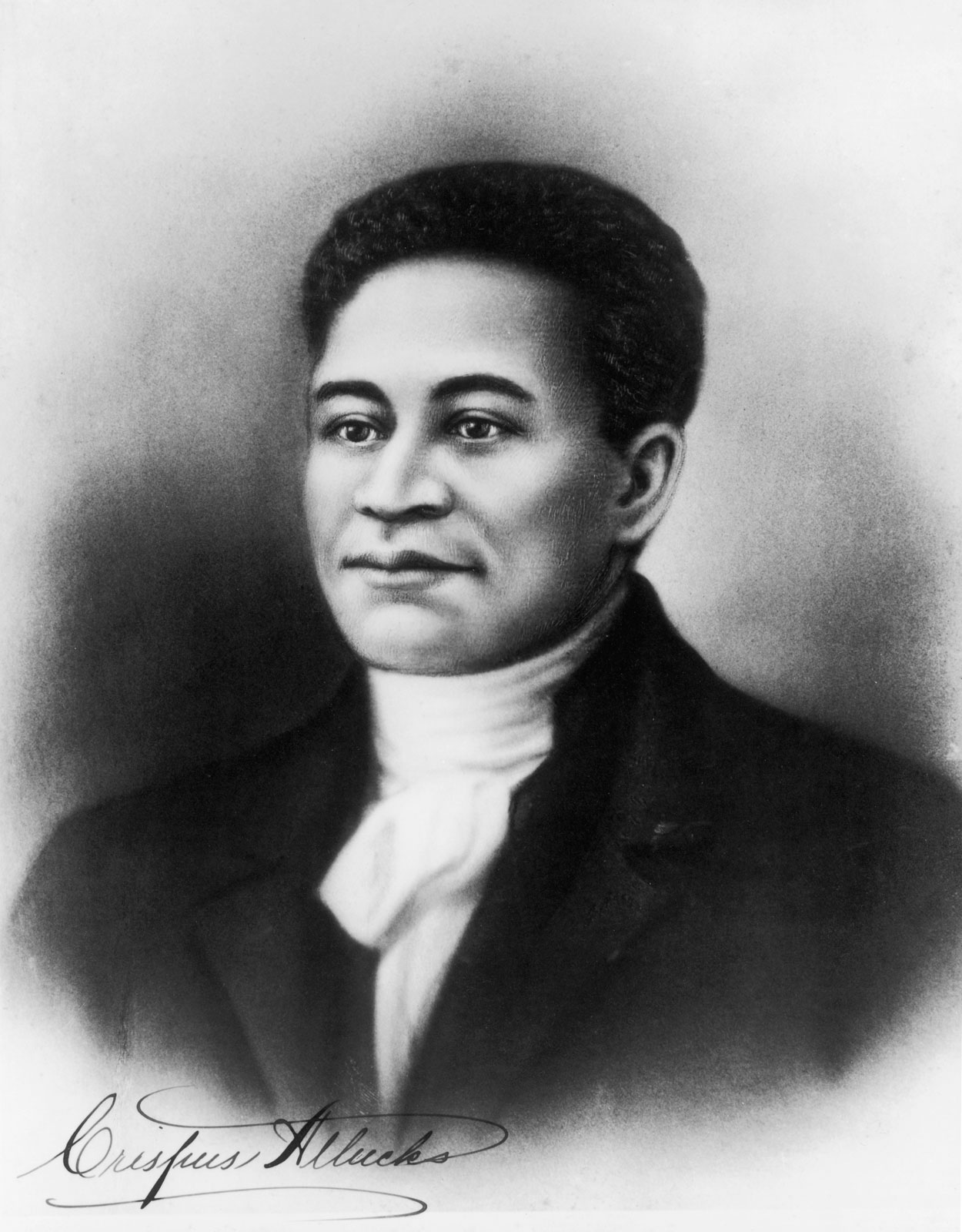
Crispus Attucks was an iconic patriot. Engaging in a protest in 1770, he was shot by royal soldiers in the Boston Massacre.

Black Americans, both as slaves and freemen, served on both sides of the Revolutionary War. Gary Nash reports that recent research concludes there were about 9,000 black soldiers who served on the American side, counting the Continental Army and Navy, state militia units, as well as privateers, wagoneers in the Army, servants, officers and spies. Ray Raphael notes that while thousands did join the Loyalist cause, "A far larger number, free as well as slave, tried to further their interests by siding with the patriots."

Black soldiers served in Northern militias from the outset, but this was forbidden in the South, where slave-owners feared arming slaves. Lord Dunmore, the Royal Governor of Virginia, issued an emancipation proclamation in November 1775, promising freedom to Patriot-owned slaves who fought for the British; Sir Henry Clinton issued a similar edict in New York in 1779. Over 100,000 slaves escaped to British lines, however only roughly 1,000 of them served on the front lines. Many Black Loyalist migrated to Nova Scotia and later to Sierra Leone. Many of the Black Loyalists performed military service in the British Army, particularly as part of the only Black regiment of the war, the Black Pioneers, and others served non-military roles.

In response, and because of manpower shortages, Washington lifted the ban on black enlistment in the Continental Army in January 1776. All-black units were formed in Rhode Island and Massachusetts; many were slaves promised freedom for serving in lieu of their masters; another African American unit came from Haiti with French forces. More than 5,000 African American soldiers fought as Revolutionaries, and at least 20,000 served with the British. Peter Salem and Salem Poor are the most noted of the African American Patriots during this era, and Colonel Tye was perhaps the most noteworthy Black Loyalist. African Americans also served with various of the South Carolina guerrilla units, including that of the "Swamp Fox", Francis Marion, half of whose force sometimes consisted of free Blacks. These Black troops made a critical difference in the fighting in the swamps, and kept Marion's guerrillas effective even when many of his white troops were down with malaria or yellow fever.

The first black American to fight in the Marines was John Martin, also known as Keto, the slave of a Delaware man, recruited in April 1776 without his owner's permission by Captain of the Marines Miles Pennington of the Continental brig USS Reprisal. Martin served with the Marine platoon on the Reprisal for a year and a half and took part in many ship-to-ship battles including boardings with hand-to-hand combat, but he was lost with the rest of his unit when the brig sank in October 1777.

At least 12 other black men served with various American Marine units in 1776–1777; more may have been in service but not identified as blacks in the records. However, in 1798 when the United States Marine Corps (USMC) was officially re-instituted, Secretary of War James McHenry specified in its rules: "No Negro, Mulatto or Indian to be enlisted". Marine Commandant William Ward Burrows instructed his recruiters regarding USMC racial policy, "You can make use of Blacks and Mulattoes while you recruit, but you cannot enlist them." The policy was formulated to set a higher standard of unit cohesion for Marines, with the unit to be made up of only one race, so that the members would remain loyal, maintain shipboard discipline and help put down mutinies. The USMC maintained this policy until 1942.

== Use of servants in the early Army ==
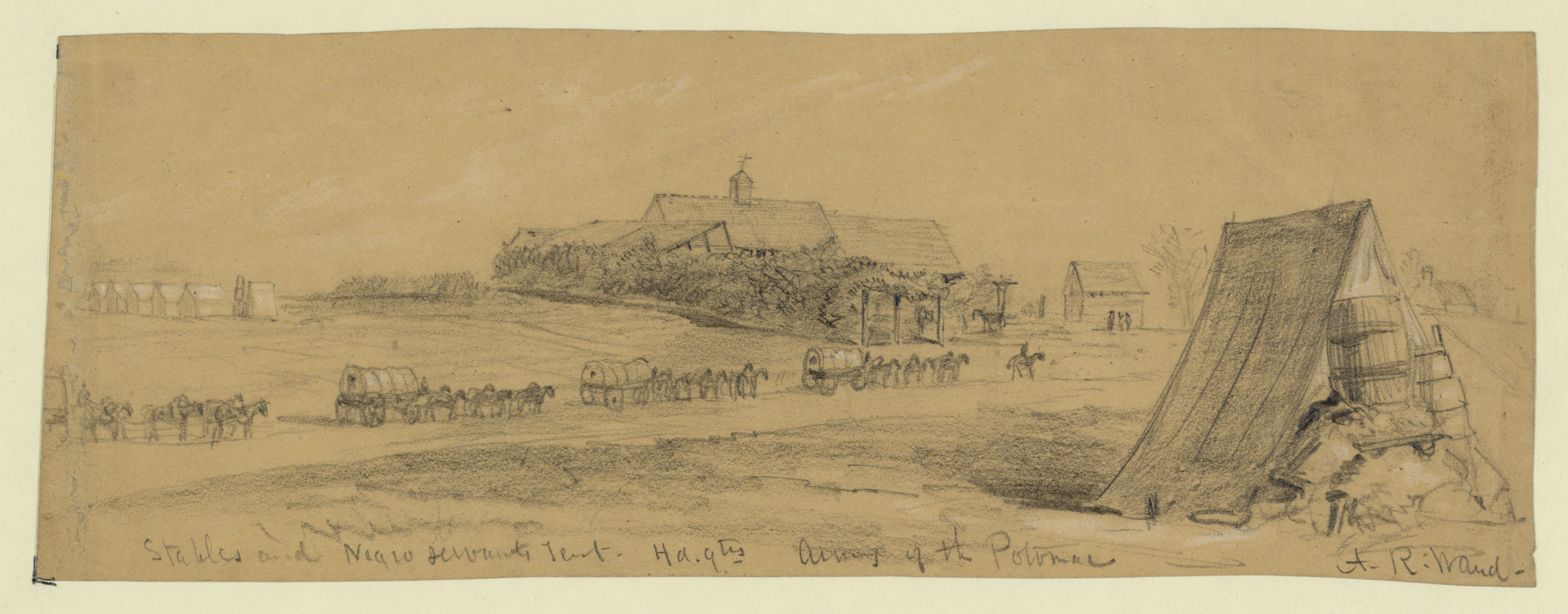
Sketch of an Army camp where African American servants had to tend to horse and lived separately in their own tents

Both during and after the Revolutionary War, the newly formed United States Army was still operating on a European styled system of military structure/culture. This included the use of enlisted soldiers as servants for officers', where they would perform tasks set by their commanding officer. With a total ban of African Americans from enlisting in the military, some slave owning officers sought to use their own slaves for use in servitude positions. Hamdani explains how it was discovered that Lt. Robert Rowan enlisted his own personal slave in the Army for the sole purpose of being his waiter, where after the discovery, the slave was discharged and the incident was reported to the Secretary of War, James McHenry. Near the end of the 18th century, the first restriction on servitude within the military was passed, where soldiers now had to voluntarily submit themselves to become servants to officers, but also allowed officers to hire "domestics" to become their servants (however costs for rations, clothing, etc. were paid by the officer who employed the servant). This first restriction would set into motion further legislation that incentivized the used of slaves in servitude positions within the military.

At the start of the War of 1812, Congress officers allowed to hire personal servants where funds for clothing and rations would be paid for by military, which further incentivized officers to use other means of servitude instead of the use of soldiers. The final piece of legislation came in 1814 that directly outlawed the use of soldiers as servants as well as reducing the amount of servants officers could have, but allowed officers to cover the costs of private servants with military money. This allowed slave owning officers to incorporate their slaves as servants and have the costs fully covered, which incentivized other officers to follow suit.

== War of 1812 ==
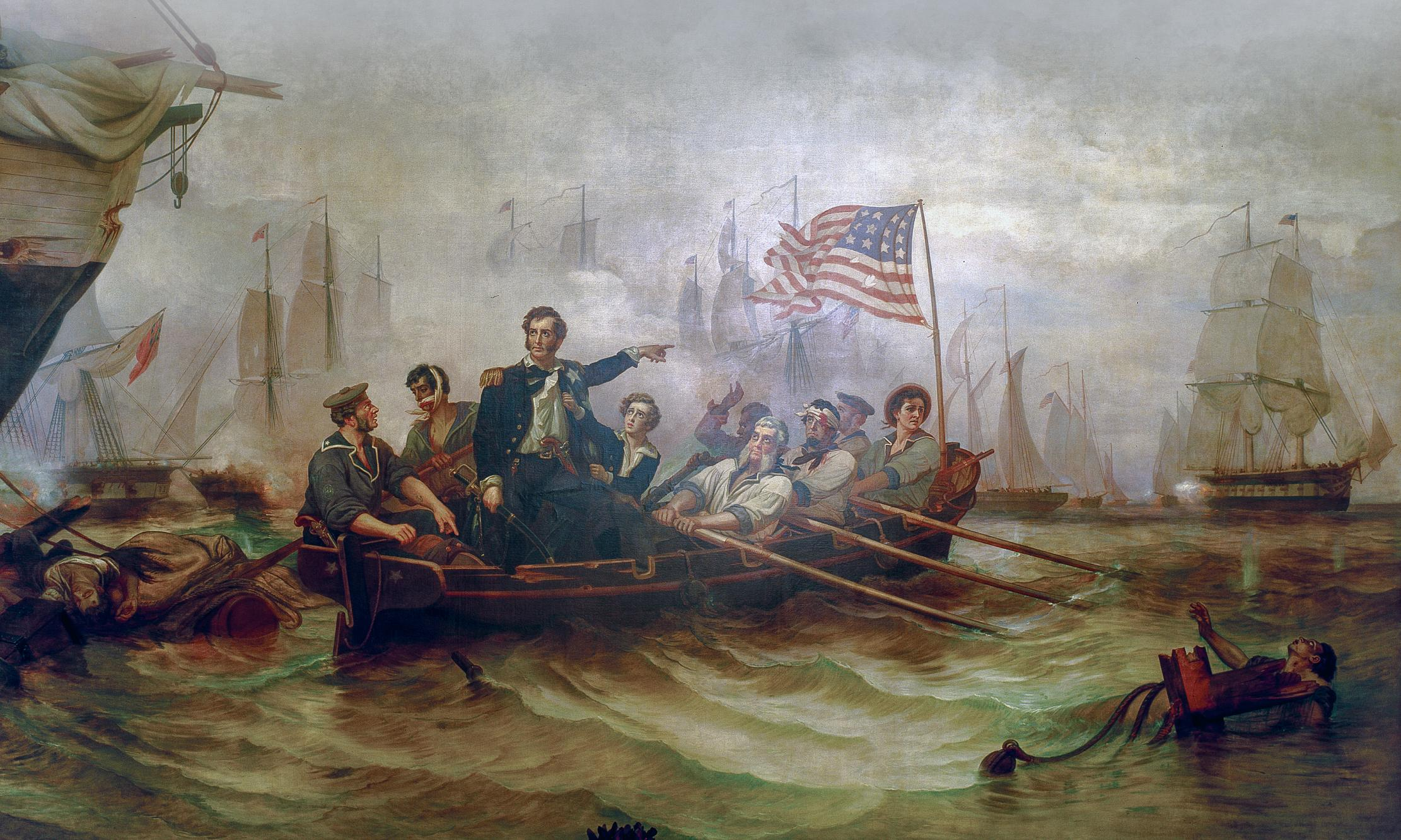
Painting of the Battle of Lake Erie depicting one of Perry's African-American oarsmen in the boat and another African-American sailor in the water

During the War of 1812, about one-quarter of the personnel in the American naval squadrons of the Battle of Lake Erie were black, and portrait renderings of the battle on the wall of the nation's Capitol and the rotunda of Ohio's Capitol show that blacks played a significant role in it. Hannibal Collins, a freed slave and Oliver Hazard Perry's personal servant, is thought to be the oarsman in William Henry Powell's Battle of Lake Erie. Collins earned his freedom as a veteran of the Revolutionary War, having fought in the Battle of Rhode Island. He accompanied Perry for the rest of Perry's naval career, and was with him at Perry's death in Trinidad in 1819.

No legal restrictions regarding the enlistment of blacks were placed on the Navy because of its chronic shortage of manpower. The law of 1792, which generally prohibited enlistment of blacks in the Army became the United States Army's official policy until 1862. The only exception to this Army policy was Louisiana, which gained an exemption at the time of its purchase through a treaty provision, which allowed it to opt out of the operation of any law, which ran counter to its traditions and customs. Louisiana permitted the existence of separate black militia units which drew its enlistees from freed blacks.

A militia unit, In Louisiana, the 2nd Battalion of Free Men of Color, was a unit of black soldiers from Santo Domingo led by a Black free man and Santo-Domingue emigre Joseph Savary offered their services and were accepted by General Andrew Jackson in the Battle of New Orleans, a victory that was achieved after the war was officially over.

Blacks fought at the Battle of Bladensburg August 24, 1814, many as members of Commodore Joshua Barney's naval flotilla force. This force provided crucial artillery support during the battle. One of the best accounts is that by Charles Ball (born 1785). Ball served with Commodore Joshua at the Battle of Bladensburg and later helped man the defenses at Baltimore. In his 1837 memoir, Ball reflected on the Battle of Bladensburg: "I stood at my gun, until the Commodore was shot down… if the militia regiments, that lay upon our right and left, could have been brought to charge the British, in close fight, as they crossed the bridge, we should have killed or taken the whole of them in a short time; but the militia ran like sheep chased by dogs." Barney's flotilla group included numerous African Americans who provided artillery support during the battle. Modern scholars estimate blacks made up between 15 and 20%, of the American naval forces in the War of 1812.

Just before the battle Commodore Barney on being asked by President James Madison "if his negroes would not run on the approach of the British?" replied: "No Sir…they don't know how to run; they will die by their guns first." The Commodore was correct, the men did not run, one such man was young sailor Harry Jones (no. 35), apparently a free black. Harry Jones was wounded in the final action at Bladensburg. Due to the severity of Jones wounds, he remained a patient at the Naval Hospital Washington DC for nearly two months.

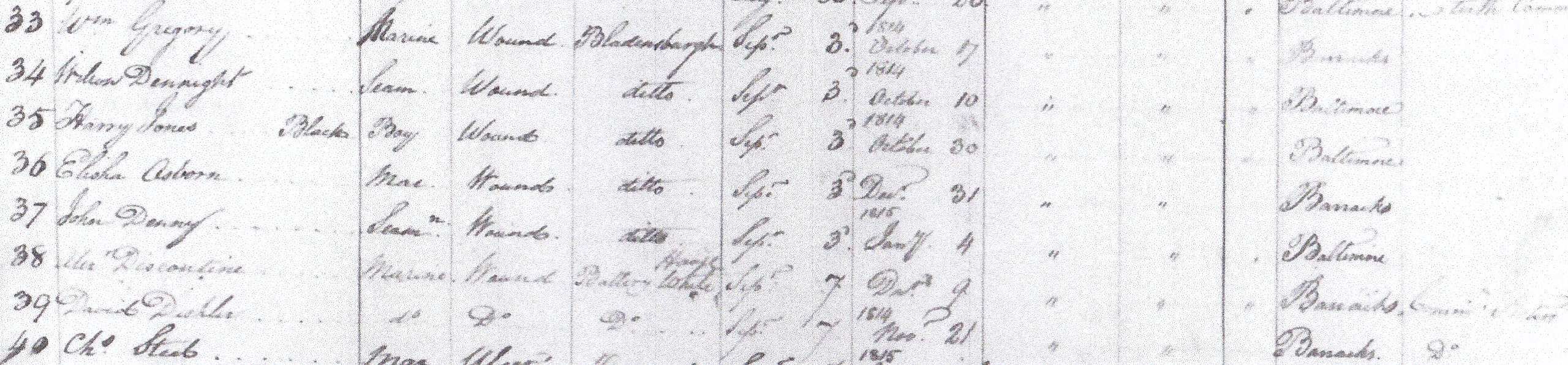
African-American seaman Harry Jones is enumerated patient no. 35 on this 1814 Register of Patients, Naval Hospital Washington. Register states "Harry Jones black boy wound Bladensburg". "Boy", in this context, was a reference to rank. Boys in the early Navy were simply young sailors in training, aged 12 to 18.

African Americans also served with the British. On April 2, 1814, Vice Admiral Alexander Cochrane issued a proclamation to all Americans wishing to emigrate, similar to the aforementioned Dunmore's Proclamation some 40 years previous. Any persons would be received by the British, either at a military outpost or aboard British ships; those seeking sanctuary could enter His Majesty's forces, or go "as free settlers to the British possessions in North America or the West Indies". Among those who went to the British, some joined the Corps of Colonial Marines, an auxiliary unit of marine infantry, embodied on May 14, 1814. British commanders later stated the new marines fought well at Bladensburg and confirm that two companies took part in the burning of Washington including the White House. Following the Treaty of Ghent, the British kept their promise and in 1815 evacuated the Colonial Marines and their families to Halifax Canada and Bermuda.

Servitude still continued throughout the War of 1812 due to previous legislation in 1802 that allowed African American servants to be given rations paid for by the government and not by their commanding officers. As the war continued, Congress allowed more rations/gear to be given to private servants that also came out of the government’s purse as well as finally passing a ban on use of soldiers as servants, which would incentivize the use of African Americans within the military as officers could now only use private servants.

== 1815 to 1840 ==
African Americans would gain a growing presence in the military in this era, whether it be in areas of enlistment or with servitude under officers. With an 1816 legislation from Congress that would allow for full cost coverage from the government with usage of private servants. Many slave owning officers would take advantage of this up until the full ban of servitude (post-Civil War). This led to a slow growth of the number of African Americans in the range of the thousands, where they would begin to gain more prevalence within the armed forces. Although African Americans within servitude positions would see virtually no opposition to their inclusion, they would face it in areas of enlistment at this time.

"Despite Southern attempts to restrict their movements with the Negro Seaman Acts, African American sailors continued to enlist in the Navy in substantial numbers throughout the 1820s and 1830s." From the Treaty of Ghent to the Mexican-American War, African Americans made up a significant part of the peacetime navy. Data collected by Dr. Elnathan Judson USN, for his 1823 report, to the Secretary of the Navy, contains detailed information re the number of seamen vaccinated in the Boston area. This report which covers four months listed 161 men and boys of which, Dr. Judson enumerated 30 as black or 18.7% of the total.

Commodore William Bainbridge in a 14 September 1827 letter to Secretary of the Navy Samuel L. Southhard, reported 102 men had been received from the Philadelphia area of which 18 were Black or 17.6%. Bainbridge concluded by informing the Southard "I ordered the Recruiting Officer not to enter anymore until further notice." Data for 1839 was collected by Commodore Lewis Warrington and forwarded to the Secretary of the Navy as a memorandum with the number of recruits from 1 September 1838 to September 17, 1839. This document provides data for five naval recruiting stations which in total reflect 1016 men entered or naval service, "of which 122 were Black" or 12% of the total.

== Mexican–American War ==
A number of African Americans in the Army during the Mexican–American War were servants of the officers who received government compensation for the services of their servants or slaves. Also, soldiers from the Louisiana Battalion of Free Men of Color participated in this war. African Americans also served on a number of naval vessels during the Mexican–American War, including the USS Treasure, and the USS Columbus.

The involvement of African Americans in this war was one where they were not included as actual soldiers. There were however, a few cases of African Americans joining in the fighting and these people became known as "Black Toms". Many slaves that were brought into assist the army officers escaped to Mexico. However, whenever the American Army would encounter these African Americans they viewed them as stolen property and dissolved them back into the racial hierarchy of the army.

== American Civil War ==
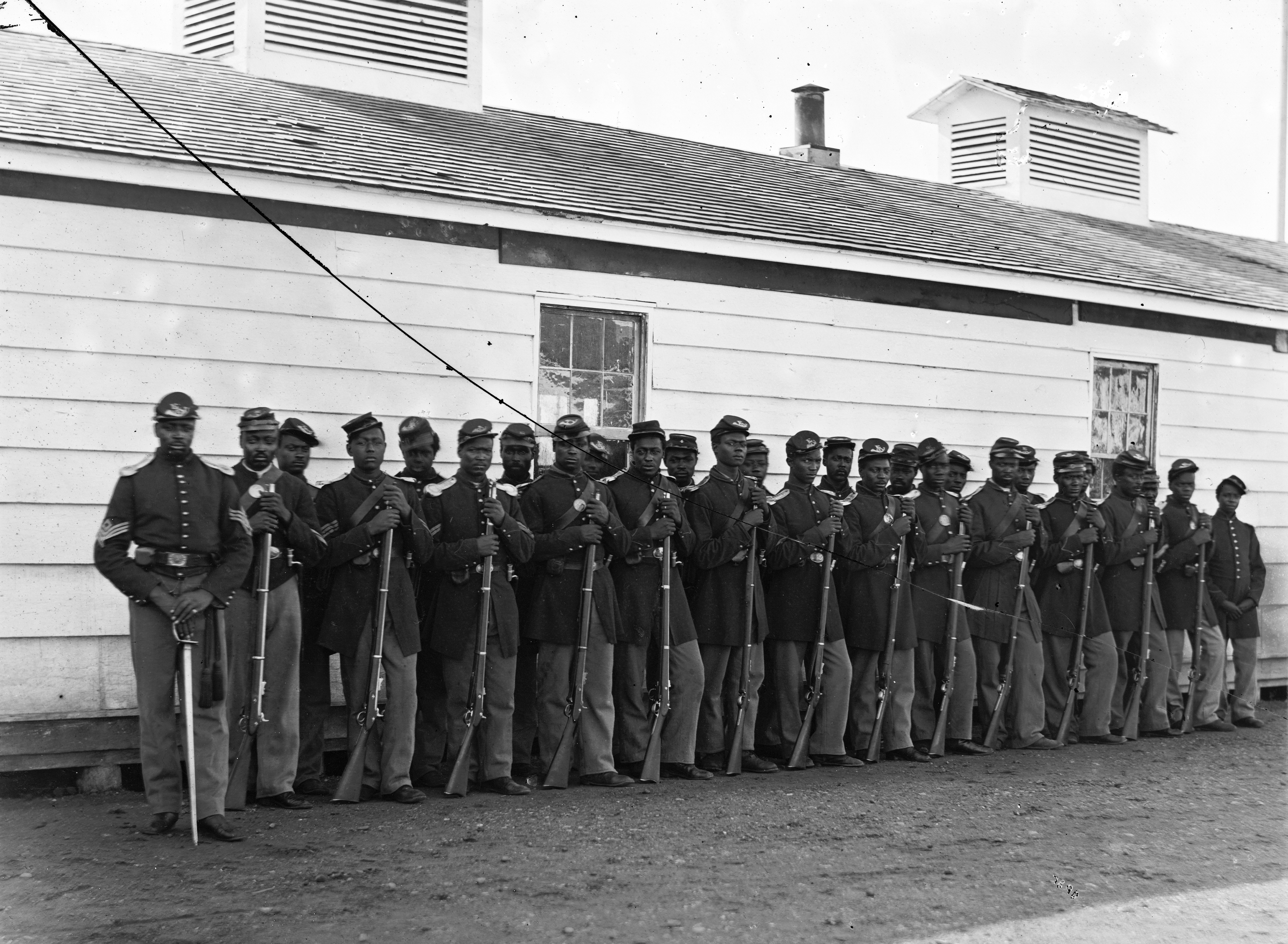
Company E of the 4th Colored Regiment, which served at the Battle of Chaffin's Farm. USCT.

The history of African Americans in the U.S. Civil War is marked by 186,097 (7,122 officers, 178,975 enlisted) African-American men, comprising 163 units, who served in the Union Army during the Civil War, and many more African Americans served in the Union Navy. Both free African Americans and runaway slaves joined the fight. According to historian Kelly Mezurek, author of For Their Own Cause: The 27th United States Colored Troops (The Kent State University Press, 2016), "Almost 179,000 thousand men served in the United States Colored Troops – that's almost ten percent of the Union Army. They served in infantry, artillery, and cavalry."

African Americans were initially not allowed to join the Union Army but were finally allowed in 1862 after smaller forms of protests. Many of the protests were by African American men who wanted to not only express their patriotism but also establish and fight for their identities by fighting for the Union, and would do so in forms of petitions, grouping up with each other to enlist to volunteer in mass, and forms of community resolutions. After being allowed to join, black soldiers would have their names documented and have their pictures taken before being sent off to their duties. (planning to add a couple of portraits to this section)

On the Union side of the war, black enlistees would either participate directly on the front lines or be delegated to laborious roles away from combat. At this time, black soldiers would also see pay differences from their white counterparts, where they were told they would be paid the same amount. Whether it be pay differences or differences in roles, many black soldiers would become disgruntled, even to the point where Corporal James Gooding would send a letter to Lincoln asking, "… are we Soldiers or Laborers? We are fully armed, and equipped… we have done a soldier’s duty. Why can't we have a soldiers pay?"

On the Confederate side, blacks, both free and slave, were used for labor. In the final months of the war, the Confederate Army was desperate for additional soldiers so the Confederate Congress voted to recruit black troops for combat; they were to be promised their freedom. Some slaves fled or were taken by the Confederacy to join the Army. This would anger many slaveowners as they would see their missing slaves and demand them to be discharged and returned to them. A slave named Calvin fled his master B. Bronson in Louisiana and joined the military and was discovered by Bronson himself in downtown New Orleans. Bronson would demand the military to "give me every assistance to recover my property." Calvin was ultimately discharged by the confederate military and returned into slavery. Units were in training when the war ended, and none served in combat.

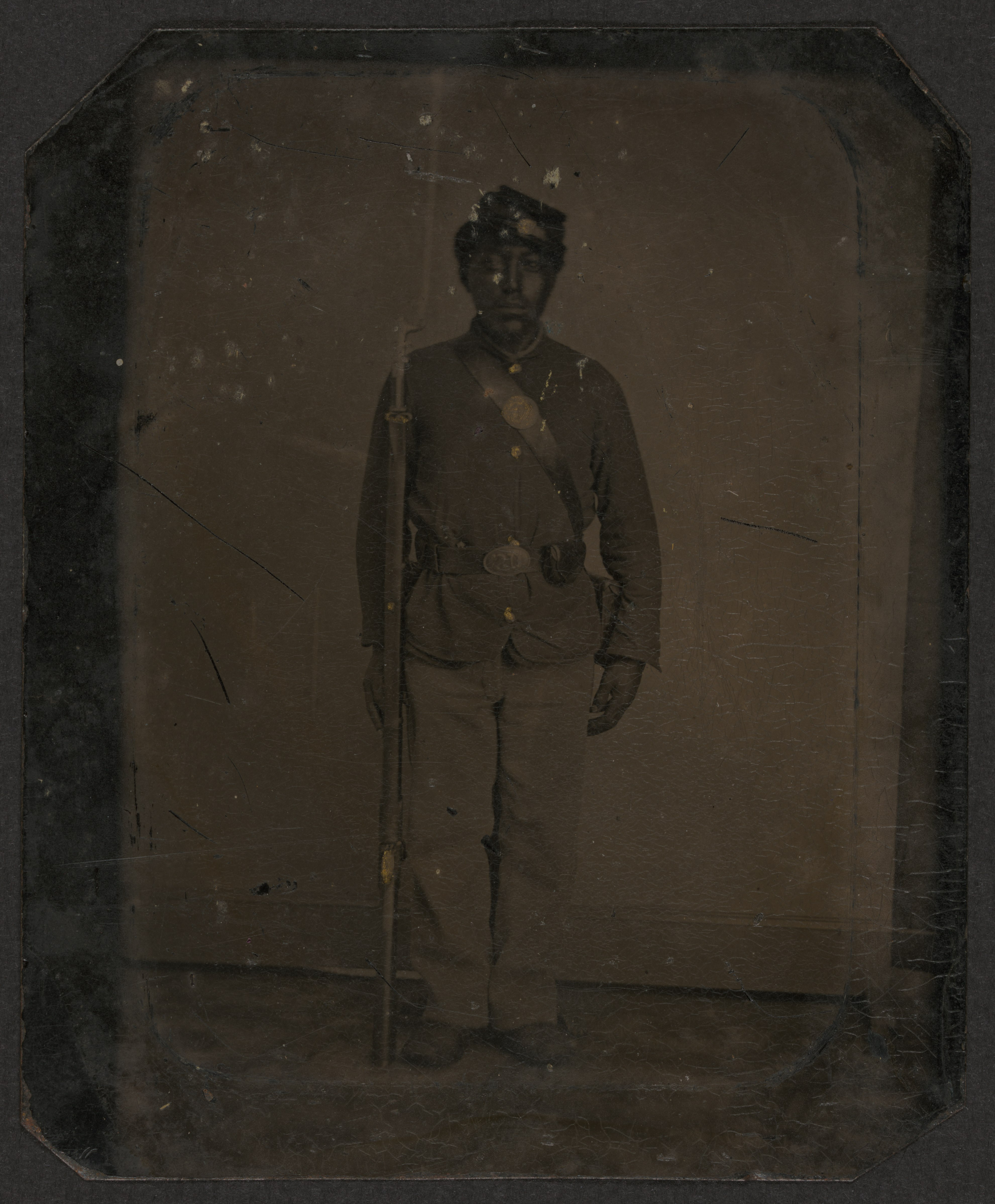
Portrait of an African American Union soldier, 1861

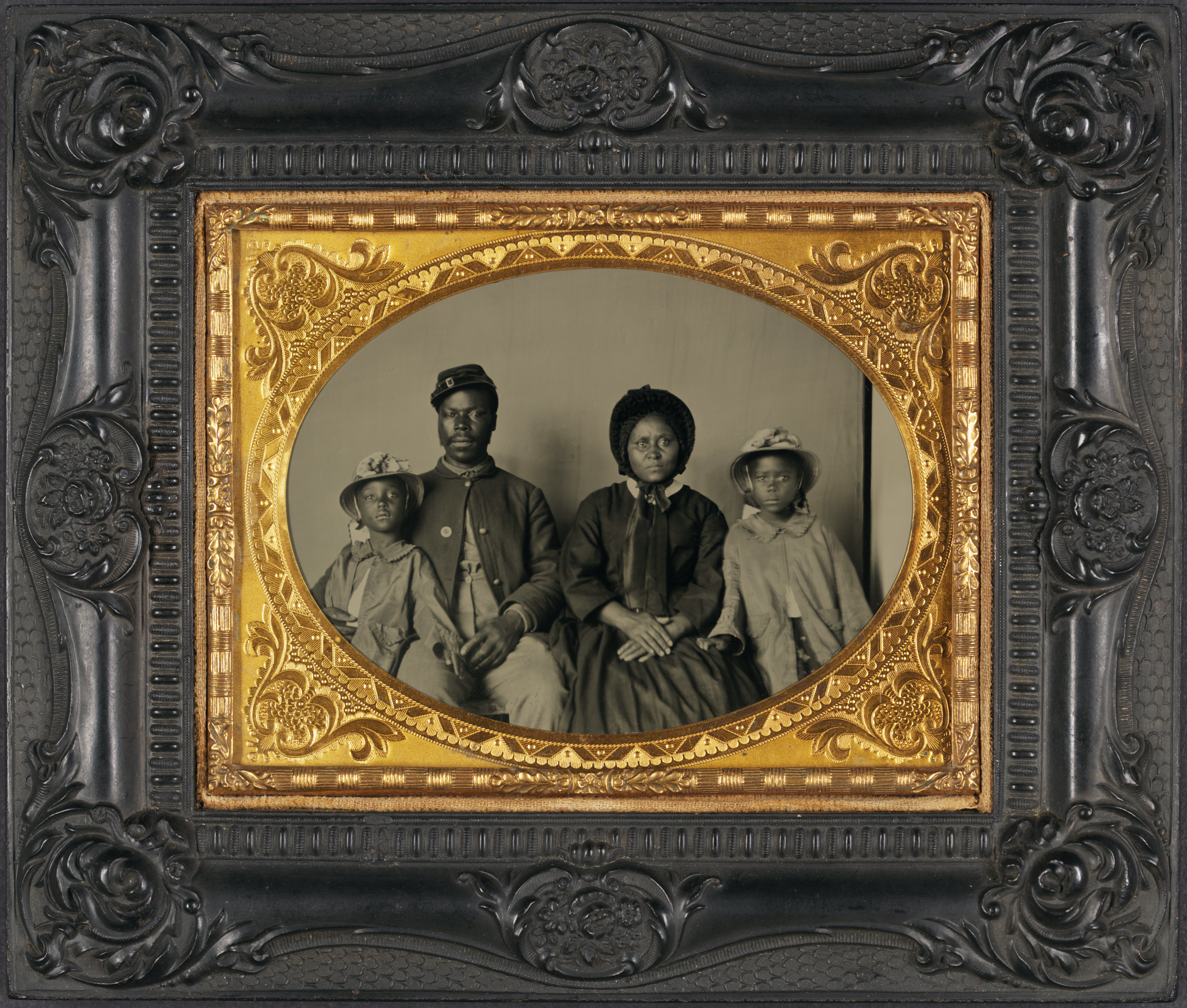
Sgt. Samuel Smith, African American soldier in Union uniform, with wife and two daughters

After the Civil War, Congress would outlaw the use of private/enslaved servants by military officers, ending a near century of enslaved servant use in the military, where now the only presence of African Americans in the military is with free enlistees.

- 54th Massachusetts Infantry Regiment

== Indian Wars ==
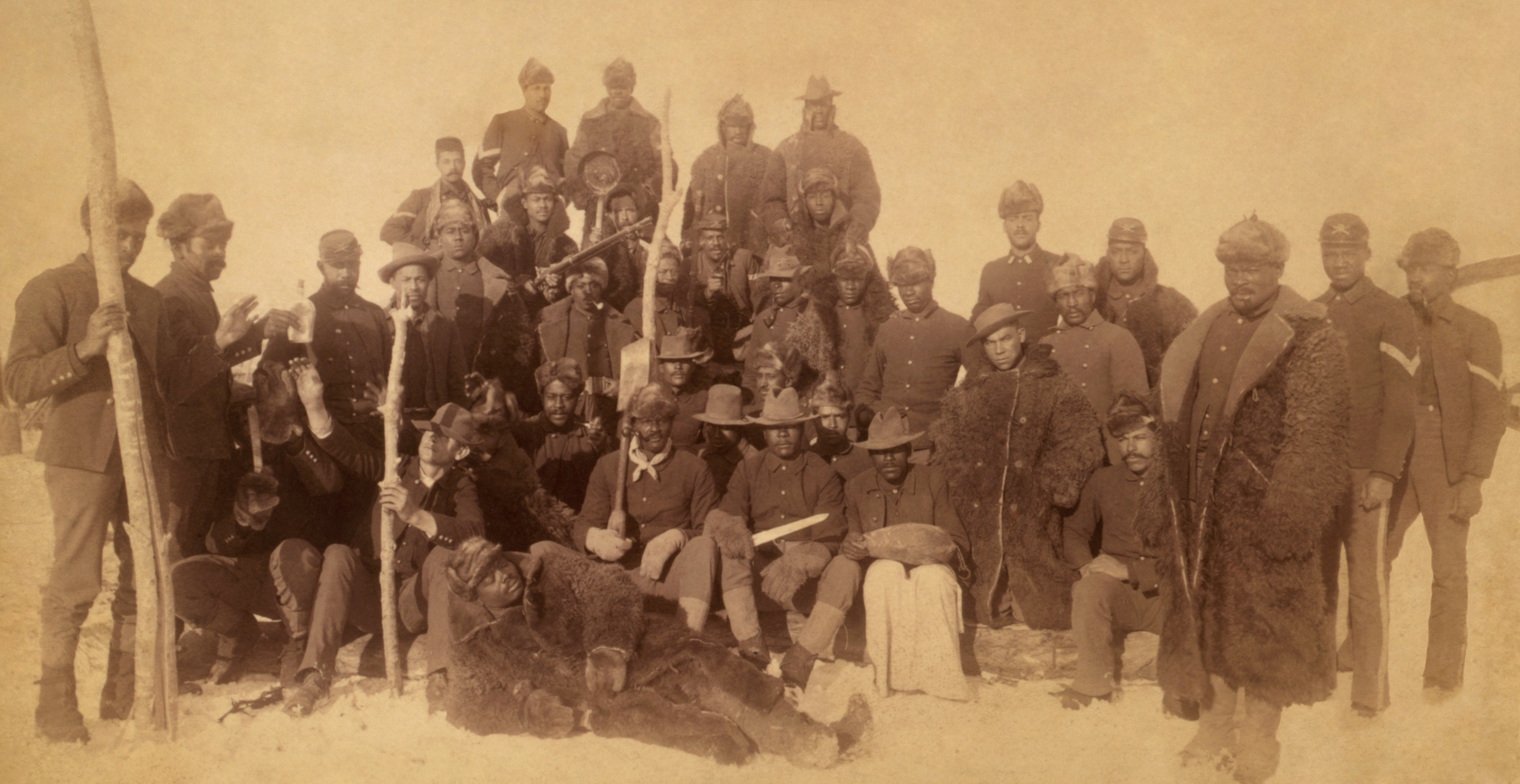
Buffalo Soldiers of the 25th Infantry Regiment, 1890

From 1863 to the early 20th century, African-American units were utilized by the Army to combat the Native Americans during the Indian Wars. The most noted among this group were the Buffalo Soldiers:

- 9th Cavalry Regiment
- 10th Cavalry Regiment
- 24th Infantry Regiment
- 25th Infantry Regiment

At the end of the U.S. Civil War the army reorganized and authorized the formation of two regiments of black cavalry (the 9th and 10th US Cavalry). Four regiments of infantry (the 38th, 39th, 40th and 41st US Infantry) were formed at the same time. In 1869, the four infantry regiments were merged into two new ones (the 24th and 25th US Infantry). These units were composed of black enlisted men commanded by white officers such as Benjamin Grierson, and occasionally, an African-American officer such as Henry O. Flipper. The "Buffalo Soldiers" served a variety of roles along the frontier from building roads to guarding the U.S. mail.

These regiments served at a variety of posts in the southwest United States and Great Plains regions. During this period they participated in most of the military campaigns in these areas and earned a distinguished record. Thirteen enlisted men and six officers from these four regiments earned the Medal of Honor during the Indian Wars.

=== The Spanish-American War ===
The brief but significant Spanish-American War lasted a mere four months, from May to August 1898, beginning three months after one of America's first battleships, the USS Maine, was blown up in Havanna Harbor. Victory in this war marked the emergence of America as a world power, ousting Spain from Cuba and Puerto Rico, and taking over former Spanish possessions in the Pacific of Guam, Hawaii and the Philippines.

This conflict also holds a vital place in the military history of African-Americans, since African Americans could then enlist as full-fledged members of the U.S.Navy, were considered sailors, and performed a wide array of duties on board ship. "At that time [1898] as it had been since the Continental Navy in the American Revolution [1775], Black sailors were an integral part of the crew," said Rear Admiral Sam Cox, director of Naval History and Heritage Command, in a speech commemorating the 125th anniversary of the Maine. "There was no segregation at the enlisted ranks." Cox admits that 'this had more to do with how hard it was to recruit anyone, of any race, for a life of danger and hardship at sea," than that the Navy itself was such a progressive institution, but nonetheless it remains in sharp contrast to the abrupt, rigid segregation of the Navy in WWI, beginning in 1919, when African-Americans were refused navy enlistment altogether.

However, in this earlier era, the USS Maine, one of America's proud first battleships, had among its crew of 350, some 30 black sailors, including several able seamen, five black chief petty officers and the pitcher for the USS Maine's baseball team. When the Maine catastrophically exploded in Havanna Harbor on Feb. 15, 1898 under mysterious circumstances, 260 Navy men drowned or died within hours from severe injuries from the blast – twenty-two of them from the African-American crew.

Two African-American sailors were recipients of the Medal of Honor at that time: one honored just before the war officially started (conflicts remained high in the three months after the Maine explosion until war was declared) and another sailor for his actions at the Battle of Santiago de Cuba, as U.S. warships played a central role in this final defeat of the Spanish which ended the Spanish-American War.

The Battle of Santiago de Cuba, better known to Americans as the Battle of San Juan Hill, also employed a victorious and thoroughly integrated U.S. Army, whose 8000 troops included 1,250 black soldiers, with black and white American soldiers fighting side by side. It's notable also for being the only battle which included all four of the Buffalo Soldiers regiments, the only black regiments who remained in action after the Civil War. Five Black soldiers from these regiments were awarded the Medal of Honor from this battle alone, acknowledging that it was they who had done the most difficult fighting.

The declaration of the Spanish-American War found the Army caught up short, with only 28,000 men in ranks. Quickly, a call for volunteers, National Guard units and more enlistees brought the number up to 220,000—of these, some new 5000 volunteers were black. These men were formed into five African-American Volunteer Army units and seven African-American National Guard units. Of these volunteer and national guard army units, the Illinois 8th Infantry Regiment was federalized, and made U.S. armed forces history when its entirely African-American officer corps led the unit in the combat zone.

No African-American Marines were in this conflict as the U.S. Marine Corps did not accept African Americans until World War II.

== Philippine–American War ==
Segregated company during the Spanish–American War; Camp Wikoff 1898

After the Treaty of Paris, the islands of the Philippines became a colony of the United States. When the U.S. military started to send soldiers into the islands, native rebels, who had already been fighting their former Spanish rulers, opposed U.S. colonization and retaliated, causing an insurrection. In what would be known as the Philippine–American War, the U.S. military also sent African-American regiments and units to stop the insurrection. However, due to the discrimination of African-American soldiers, some of them defected to the Philippine Army.

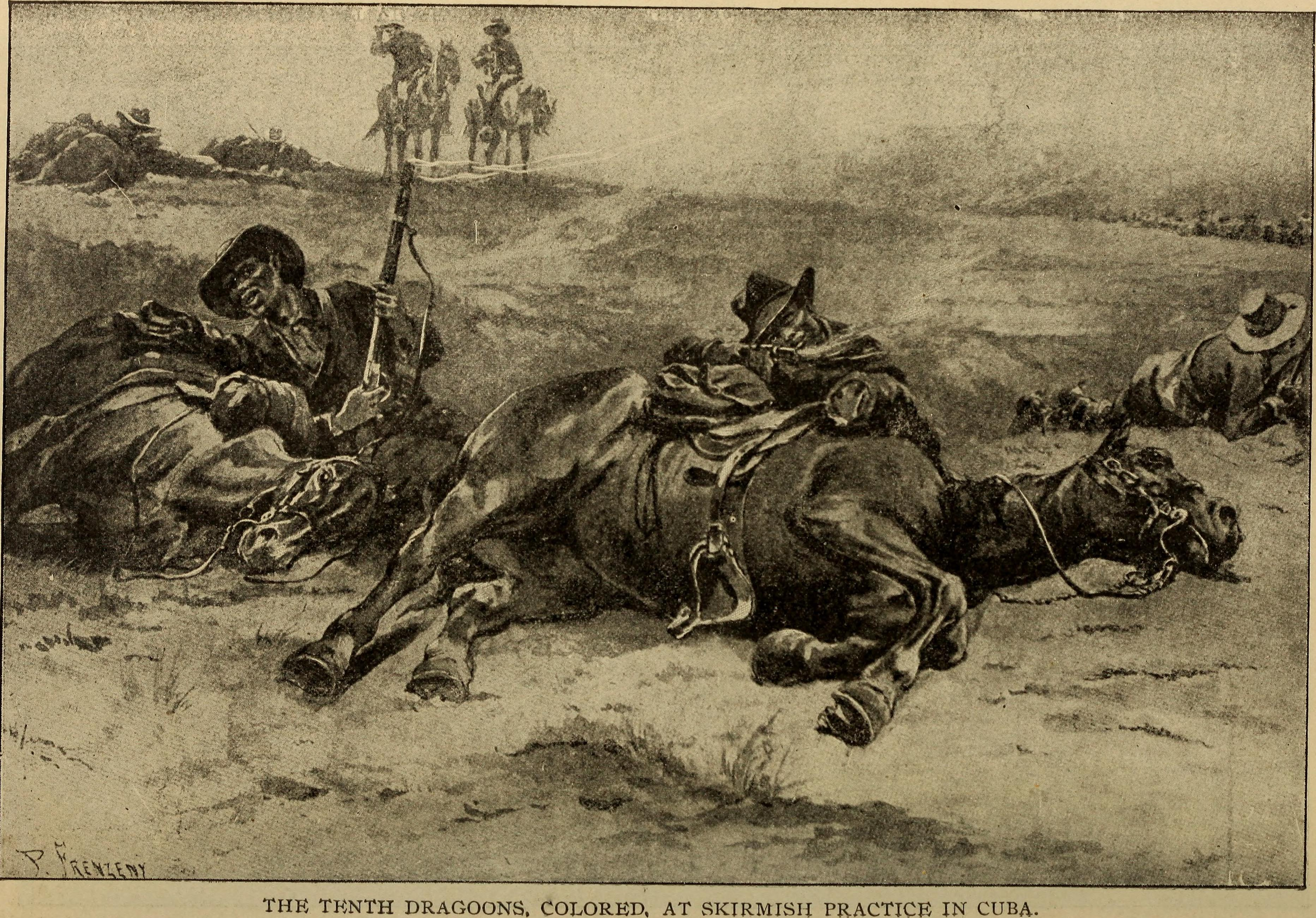
Tenth Dragoons exercise in Cuba

One of those that defected was David Fagen, who was given the rank of captain in the Philippine Army. Fagen served in the 24th Regiment of the U.S. Army, but on November 17, 1899, he defected to the Filipino army. He became a successful guerrilla leader and his capture became an obsession to the U.S. military and American public. His defection was likely the result of differential treatment by American occupational forces toward black soldiers, as well as common American forces derogatory treatment and views of the Filipino occupational resistance, who were frequently referred to as "niggers" and "gugus".

After two other black deserters were captured and executed, President Theodore Roosevelt announced he would stop executing captured deserters. As the war ended, the US gave amnesties to most of their opponents. A substantial reward was offered for Fagen, who was considered a traitor. There are two conflicting versions of his fate: one is that his was the partially decomposed head for which the reward was claimed, the other is that he took a local wife and lived peacefully in the mountains.

Starting in 1907, the riding instructor unit at West Point was made up entirely of black NCOs. Considered an elite unit made up of the best horsemen in the army, they taught riding and horsemanship to thousands of officers-assignment to it was considered a high honor and a mark of excellence. The unit was disbanded in 1946.

== World War I ==
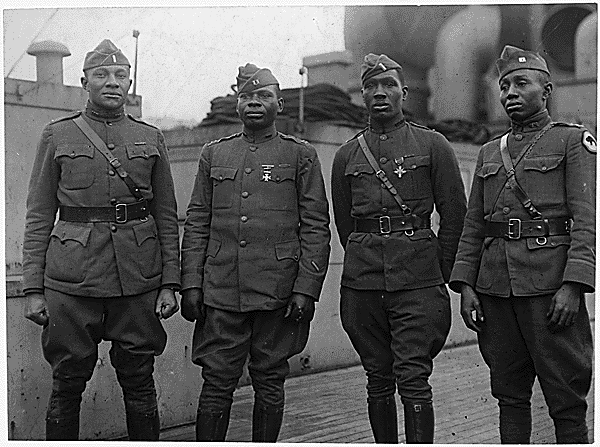
Officers of the 366th Infantry Regiment returning home from World War I service

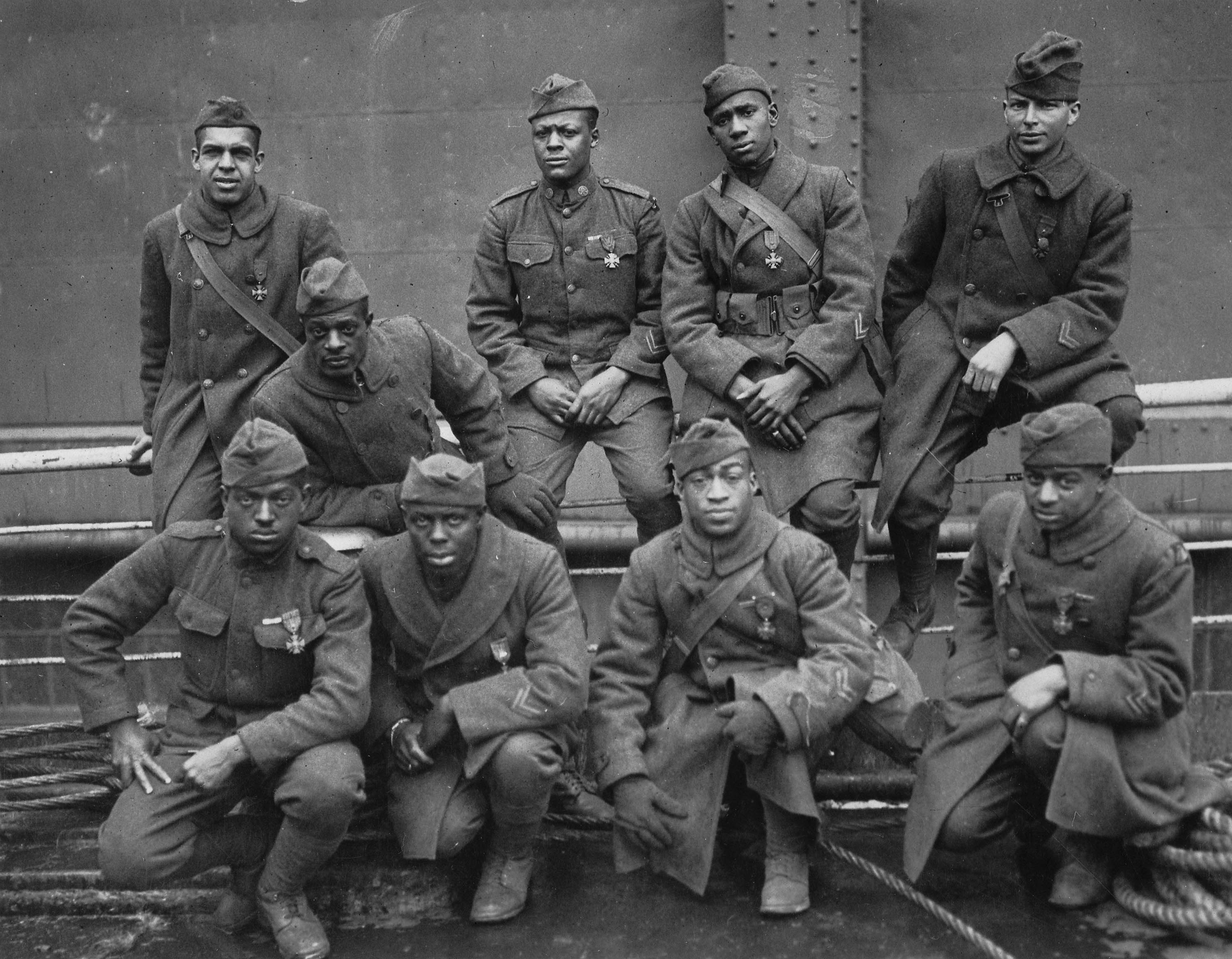
Soldiers of the 369th (15th N.Y.) who won the Croix de Guerre for gallantry in action, 1919

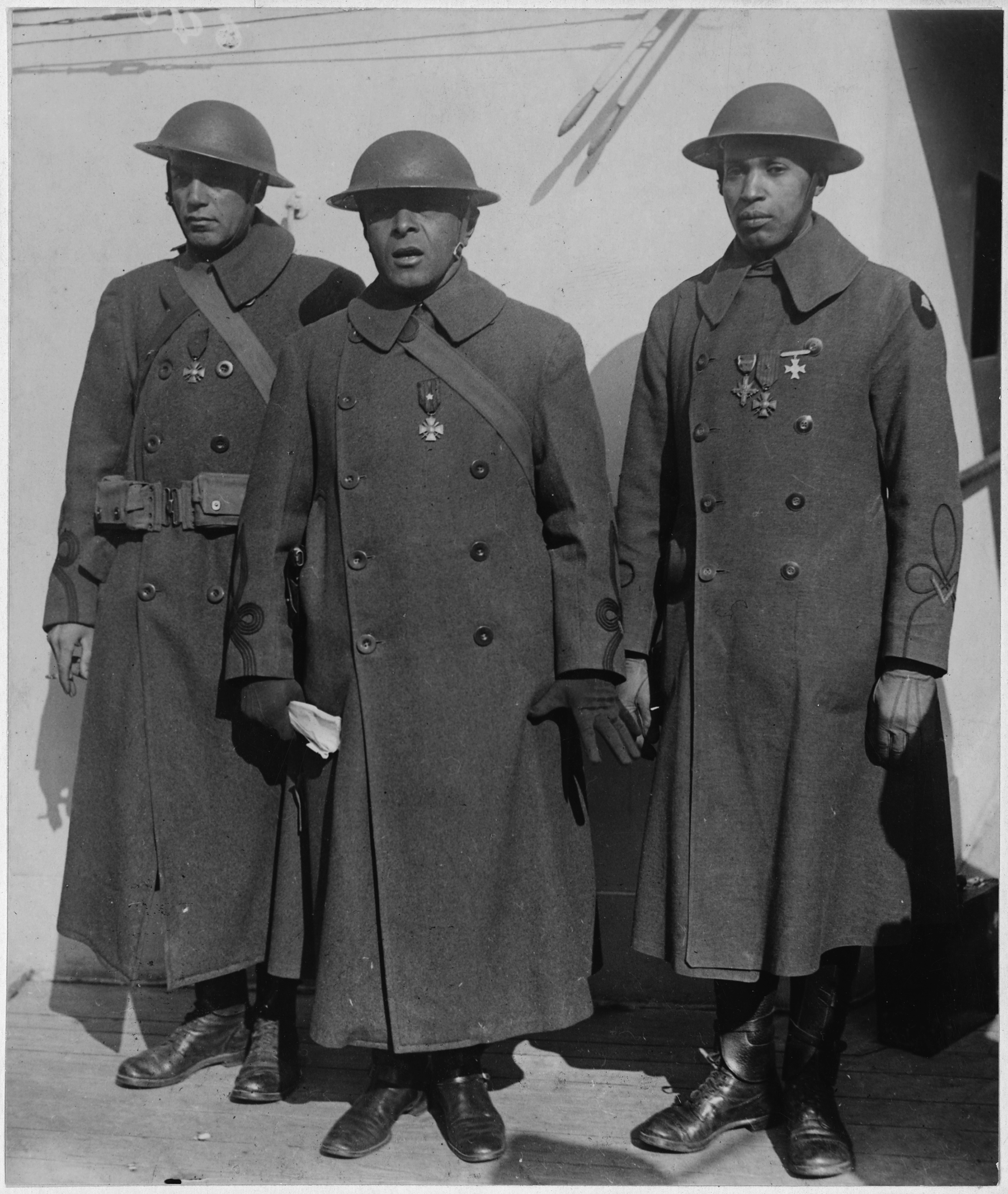
L-R: Major J.R. White; Lieutenant Colonel Otis B. Duncan, highest ranking African American officer in combat for the United States; and Lieutenant W.J. Warfield. 370th (8th IL).

When the war broke out, several African-Americans joined Allied armies. Most notably, Eugene Bullard and Bob Scanlon joined the French Foreign Legion within weeks of the start of the war. Of the twelve African-Americans who joined the Legion at the start, only two survived the war.

The U.S. armed forces remained segregated through World War I as a matter of policy and practice, and despite the effort of Black leadership to overcome that discrimination. The National Association for the Advancement of Colored People (NAACP) had been formed in 1909 to move Black equality of opportunity forward, but with the declaration of war in 1917 civil rights leader W.E.B. Du Bois declared an acceptable fall-back in the effort. "First your country, then your rights!" became the NAACP slogan.

Du Bois argued that the so-called 'double consciousness', a phrase he coined in the early 1900s, became more pronounced with this return of troops. African American soldiers who had fought for American and European freedom and democracy overseas now returned to the segregated and discriminatory American society, intensifying their awareness of their dual identity.

The optimistic belief was that by serving valiantly in the nation's war effort Blacks would gain the respect and equality that had been elusive thus far. But it was pitted against an underlying unwillingness by the War Department to become a vehicle for social change. Secretary of War Newton D. Baker had made it clear that, though African Americans would be fairly treated in the military, the department could not "undertake at this time to settle the so-called race question." Instead, the practices that limited equality and opportunity in civilian society were carried over to military society.

Prospective Black enlistees in the war effort were turned away, in large part because there were not enough segregated Black units to take them in. It was also clear that the drafting system favoured young white men over young black men, for various reasons. The Georgia selective service system 1917, saw a local draft board sending a new detailed classification questionnaire to all registrants. This helped to pick out the men deemed perfect to draft but often overlooked healthy African American men. For example, Marvin Kirk, a 21 year old African American man with no wife or children, who did not seek exemption from the draft and was in good health, did not get called up for service until August 11, 1917.

The Coweta County local board and its selective service system operated in the assumption that Black men did not have the agency to join the US military during WWI. Kirk had a draft number of 395 and the Coweta draft board reached up all the way to number 1283 to fill its 1917 quota, meaning Kirk was not in danger of being conscripted until all men in classes I and II were called. It was also common for African American men to face disputes for them to be drafted during WWI, from White Southern planters, opposing on the grounds that it would affect their regional agricultural economy by removing labourers and allowing them to serve in the war instead.

Those Blacks who were successfully enlisted were kept in the same restricted channels of their civil lives. Segregated transportation took them to segregated military bases and regiments that were rarely deployed to much more than the tasks of support and maintenance. Black men made up a third of the army's labour force. And in those jobs they were subject to treatment of indignities by white officers such as eating in the rain, having no facilities to wash clothes or bath, no toilets and sleeping in tents with no floors. In some quarters. African Americans were so cramped that they walked on trunks to move about the room.

Still, many African Americans volunteered to join the military following America's entry into the war. By the time of the armistice with Germany on November 11, 1918, over 200,000 African Americans had served with the American Expeditionary Force on the Western Front, while 170,000 remained in the United States.

The most graphic reminder of Jim Crow remaining during the war and after the soldiers returned came in the form of lynching. African American soldier Wilbur Little was lynched in Georgia after returning from fighting for wearing a uniform in public and refusing to take it off. This confirmed the message that the sacrifices of black soldiers for European freedom would not equate to racial progression.

Not all American public opinion was anti-African American when the black soldiers returned home. In New York, 3000 of the Harlem Hellfighters were greeted with a parade. The New York Herald Tribune wrote an article on the parade, describing its popularity and support:

"Up the wide avenue they swung. Their smiles outshone the golden sunlight... New York turned out to tender its dark-skinned heroes a New York welcome...Never have white Americans accorded so heartfelt and hearty a reception to a contingent of their Black country-men... Racial lines were for the time displaced. The color of their skin had nothing to do with the occasion. The blood they had shed in France was as red as any other."

Though most African-American units were largely relegated to support roles and did not see combat, some African Americans played a notable role in America's war effort. For example, the 369th Infantry Regiment, known as the "Harlem Hellfighters", was assigned to the French Army and served on the front lines for six months. 171 members of the 369th were awarded the Legion of Merit. However, the American War Department restricted black soldiers from fighting where possible, as shown by the forced retirement of Lieutenant Colonel Charles Young. Who disputed claims that he was of frail health by riding a horse from Ohio to Washington D.C, but was still disallowed from service because the US military did not want the black officer commanding white soldiers or leading a full black combat division. William Patterson, a black future communist and activist claimed it cemeted his conviction that 'the war was a white man's war'.

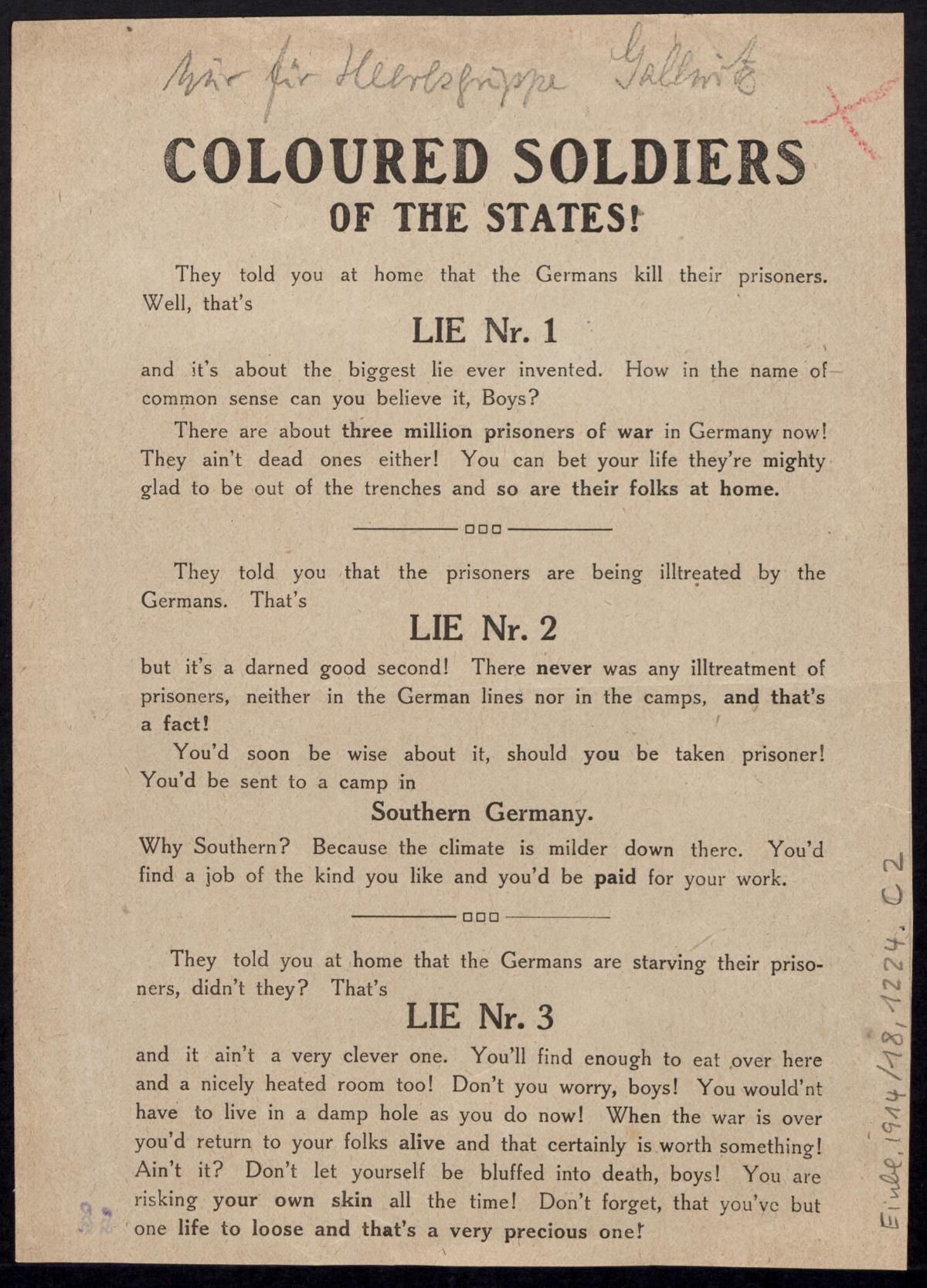
German propaganda targeting the African-American troops in WWI

Germany attempted to sway the African American troops with propaganda challenging their race-related rights back in the United States.

Corporal Freddie Stowers of the 371st Infantry Regiment that was seconded to the 157th French Army division called the Red Hand Division in need of reinforcement under the command of the General Mariano Goybet was posthumously awarded a Medal of Honor – the only African American to be so honored for actions in World War I. During action in France, Stowers had led an assault on German trenches, continuing to lead and encourage his men even after being twice wounded. Stowers died from his wounds, but his men continued the fight and eventually defeated the German troops. Stowers was recommended for the Medal of Honor shortly after his death, but the nomination was, according to the Army, misplaced. In 1990, under pressure from Congress, the Department of the Army launched an investigation. Based on findings from this investigation, the Army Decorations Board approved the award of the Medal of Honor to Stowers.

On April 24, 1991–73 years after he was killed in action – Stowers' two surviving sisters received the Medal of Honor from President George H. W. Bush at the White House. The success of the investigation leading to Stowers' Medal of Honor later sparked a similar review that resulted in six African Americans being posthumously awarded the Medal of Honor for actions in World War II. Vernon Baker was the only recipient who was still alive to receive his award.

=== Units ===
Some of the African-American units that served in World War I were:

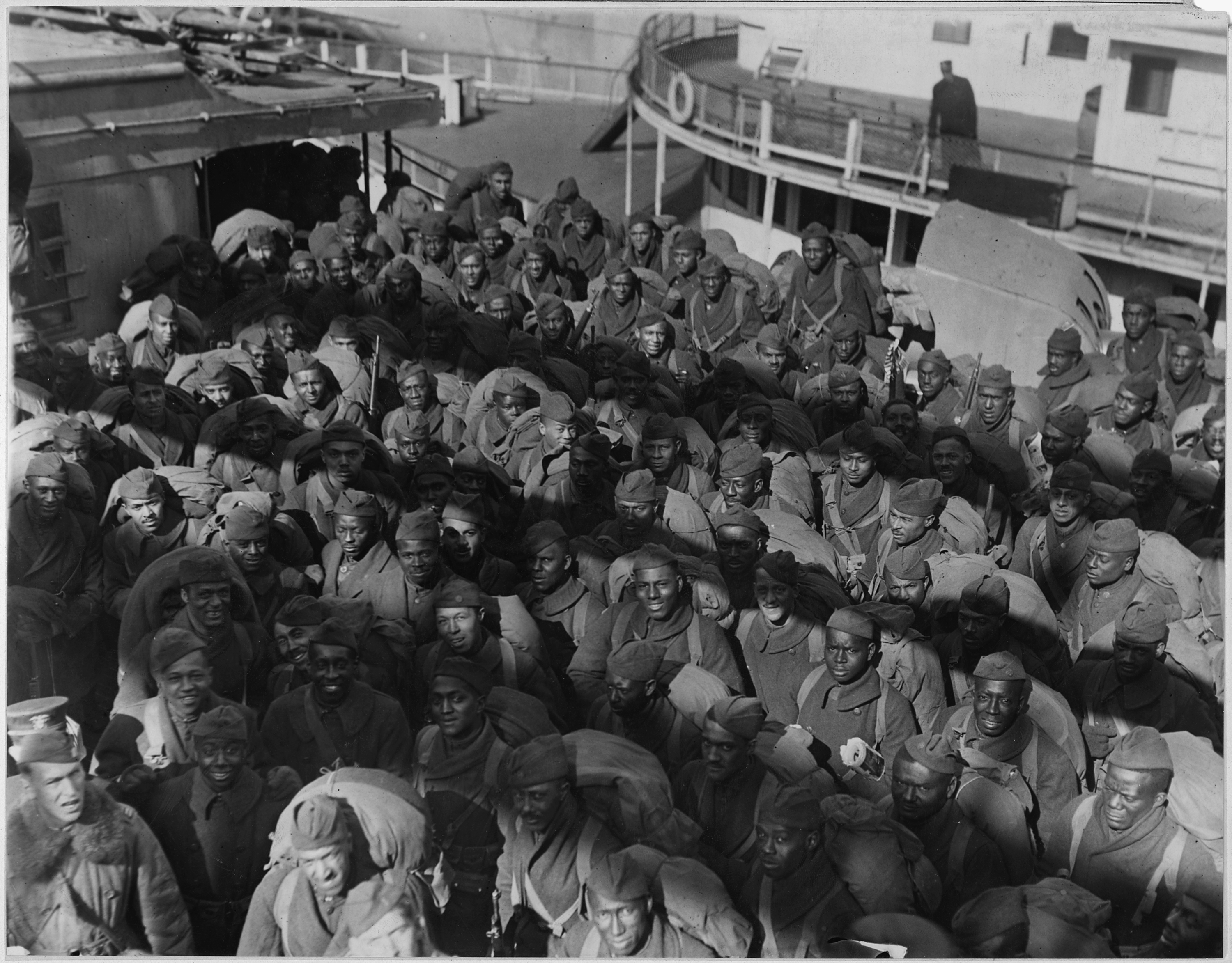
351st Field Artillery troops on the deck of the Louisville, 17 February 1919

- 92nd Infantry Division
  - 366th Infantry Regiment
- 93rd Infantry Division
  - 369th Infantry Regiment ("Harlem Hellfighters"; formerly the 15th New York National Guard)
  - 370th Infantry Regiment ("Black Devils", formerly the 8th Illinois)
  - 371st Infantry Regiment
  - 372nd Infantry Regiment

Support units included:

- Butchery Companies, Nos. 322 and 363
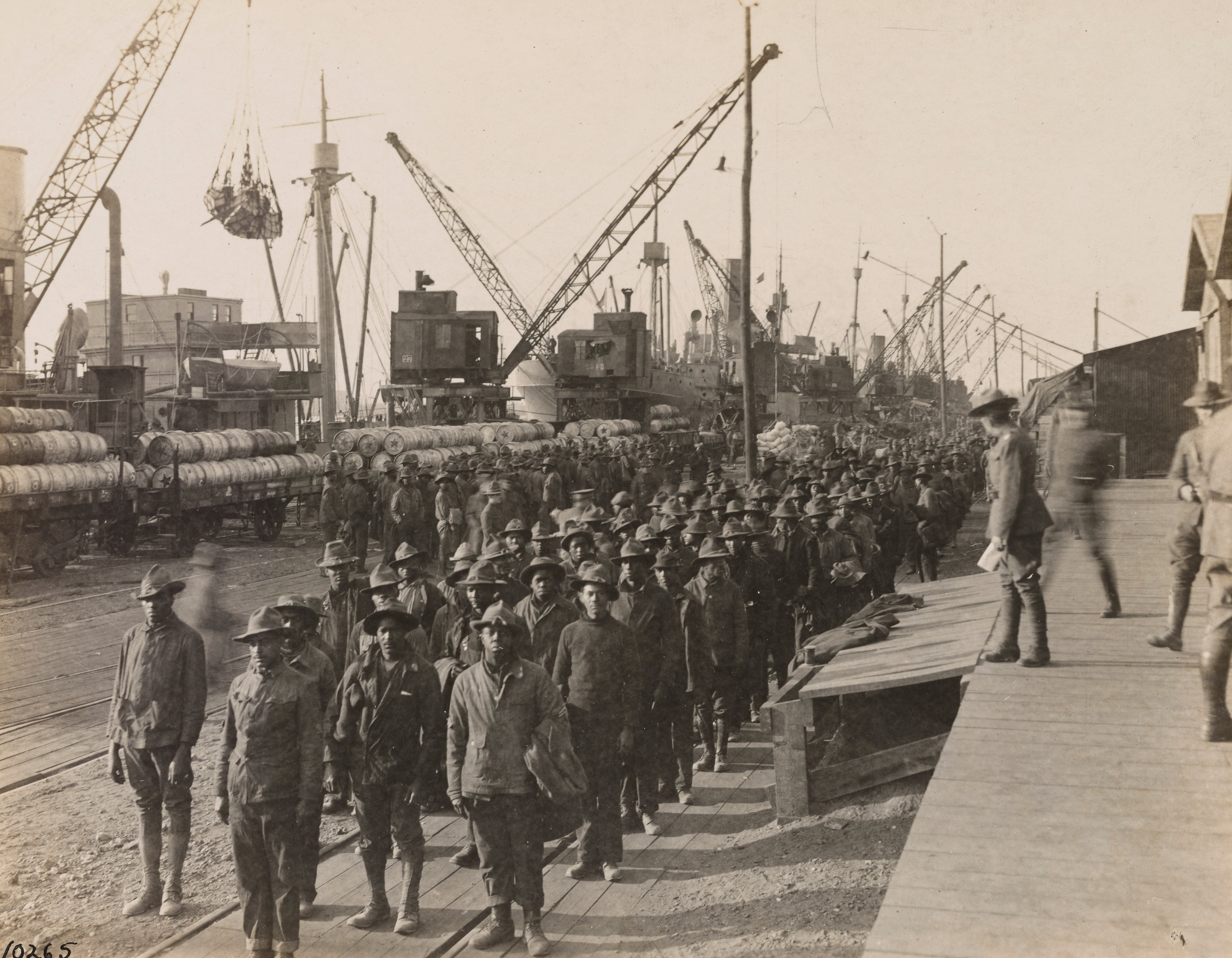
- African Americans stevedores in Bassens Docks, Bordeaux, France, april 1918
  Stevedore Regiments, Nos. 301, 302 and 303d Stevedore Regiment and Stevedore Battalions, Nos. 701, 702
- Army Corps of Engineers: Engineers Service Battalions, Nos. 505 to 567, inclusive (but skipping 531–532, 538, 537–563) (57 total; about 1008 personnel per battalion)
- Labor Battalions, Nos. 304 to 315, inclusive; Nos. 317 to 327, inclusive; Nos. 329 to 348, inclusive, and No. 357
- Labor Companies, Nos. 301 to 324, inclusive
- Pioneer Infantry Battalions, Nos. 801 to 809, inclusive; No. 811 and Nos. 813 to 816, inclusive.

A complete list of African-American units that served in the war is available.

African Americans Veterans faced heavy persecution when they returned home from World War I and many African American veterans were lynched after returning from WWI.

==== Experience of soldiers in France ====
African Americans were typically placed into labor battalions with around 160,000 of the 200,000 African Americans who were shipped out to France in 1917 finding themselves placed in one. These labor battalions were viewed as being the "dregs of the military forces" and the men in them were "driven to the brink of physical and emotional exhaustion". Jim Crow was extended to the camps where the African American soldiers were stationed and white officers would frequently remind African American soldiers of this. The 370th Infantry Regiment were informed a black member of a labor battalion had recently been hanged in the same square the unit was now assembling in a small town outside the Lorraine region.

In support of an attempt to impose American racial policy on France, U.S. military authorities sent a memo to the mayors of the Meuse division upon the arrival of the African American 372nd Infantry Regiment (The "Red Hand") in 1918. It asked that the French not integrate the Black troops into French society:

The question is of great importance to the French people and even more so to the American towns, the population of which will be affected later when the troops return to the United States. It therefore becomes necessary for both the colored and white races that undue mixing of these two be circumspectly prevented.

The request was generally disregarded by the French.

The way they were treated by white Americans in France differed markedly from the way they were treated by French troops and civilians who dealt with them roughly as equals. This left the African Americans disillusioned. African American soldiers interacted with colonial troops stationed in France, and they had already read about them in African American newspapers. The French military had reframed the debate for African Americans at home, in that France recognized that Blacks had an "important combatant role in the defence of the nation". These stories and experiences fuelled African American racial pride which contributed to their mass disillusionment when they returned home.

YMCA services in France were also segregated sixty African American y-secretaries, among them twenty-three African American women served the 200,000 black soldiers stationed in France, only three of these arrived before the armistice – including Addie W. Hunton and Kathryn M. Johnson. The YMCA work provided entertainment, recreation, and education to the vast majority of African American troops as they had more time on their hands since they served in labor battalions.

African American WWI veterans' role in the civil rights movement

According to historian Chad L Williams, "African American soldiers' experiences in the war and their battles with the pervasive racial discrimination in the U.S. military informed their postwar disillusionment and subsequent racial militancy as veterans". Examples of this racial militancy can be seen in the prominent roles which some African American WWI veterans played in the civil rights movement. For example, William N. Colston, an African American veteran who had served in the 367th infantry during the war, published several essays in the US's leading radical African American magazine- the Messenger. These articles aimed to illustrate the experiences which African Americans soldiers had throughout the war. African American's wartime experiences also played a key role in the formation of the League for Democracy which was a Civil Rights movement formed by African American soldiers serving in the 92nd Division with its key aim being to combat racial discrimination within the military.

==== Treatment of African Americans during WW I and its effects on the civil rights movement ====
The disillusionment which African American soldiers felt after they returned to the US after World War I contributed to the increasing momentum of the civil rights movement. Black US soldiers failed to escape from the arm of Jim Crow whilst they were serving in World War I, and domestically, their fellow African Americans faced the same discrimination within the US. This poor treatment, aided by the end of the war, contributed to calls for the passage of laws like the Greater Liberia Act.

The greater Liberia Act called for relocation of African Americans to Liberia and surrounding territories, arguing that racial separatism would improve the lives of both black and whites. Black nationalist Florence Kenna, who fought for the passing of the Greater Liberia Act, acknowledged that mass emigration of African Americans to Liberia would be an opportunity to escape the deep routed discrimination they faced. This observation was aided by the extension of Jim Crow to the US military and the reality that African Americans would still be treated as second class citizens despite their service for the US in WW I.

== Interwar period ==
=== Second Italo-Abyssinian War ===
On October 4, 1935, Fascist Italy invaded Ethiopia. Being the only non-colonized African country besides Liberia, the invasion of Ethiopia caused a profound response amongst African Americans. In New York City, clashes took place between African Americans and the Italian immigrant community, many of whom vocally supported Mussolini's invasion. A rally held at Madison Square Garden on Sept. 26, less than a week before the invasion, brought out more than 10,000 to hear civil rights leader W.E.B. Du Bois, Paul Robeson and others speak about the impending disaster. Samuel Daniels, head of the Pan-African Reconstruction Association, toured major American cities to recruit volunteers. African Americans organized to raise money for medical supplies, and several thousand volunteered to fight for the African kingdom. Most volunteers were blocked from leaving the United States due to the American government's desire to remain neutral in the conflict.

Volunteer John C. Robinson, a pilot and graduate of Tuskegee University, made his way to Ethiopia to assist with training pilots for Ethiopia's new air force. Ethiopian Emperor Haile Selassie soon personally named Robinson commander of the entire air force. Robinson was given the nickname the "Brown Condor" by Ethiopian forces for his service.

Many years later Haile Selassie I would comment on the efforts: "We can never forget the help Ethiopia received from Negro Americans during the crisis. ... It moved me to know that Americans of African descent did not abandon their embattled brothers, but stood by us."

=== Spanish Civil War ===
When General Franco rebelled against the newly established secular Spanish Republic, a number of African Americans volunteered to fight for Republican Spain. Many African Americans who were in the Abraham Lincoln Brigade had Communist ideals. Among these, there was Vaughn Love who went to fight for the Spanish loyalist cause because he considered Fascism to be the "enemy of all black aspirations."

African-American activist and World War I veteran Oliver Law, fought in the Abraham Lincoln Brigade during the Spanish Civil War.

James Peck was an African-American man from Pennsylvania who was turned down when he applied to become a military pilot in the US. He then went on to serve in the Spanish Republican Air Force until 1938. Peck was credited with shooting down five Aviación Nacional planes, two Heinkel He-51s from the Legion Condor and three Fiat CR.32 Fascist Italian fighters.

Salaria Kea was a young African-American nurse from Harlem Hospital who served as a military nurse with the American Medical Bureau in the Spanish Civil War. She was one of the two only African-American female volunteers in the midst of the war-torn Spanish Republican areas. When Salaria came back from Spain, she wrote the pamphlet "A Negro Nurse in Spain" and tried to raise funds for the beleaguered Spanish Republic.

== World War II ==
We call upon the president and congress to declare war on Japan and racial prejudice in our country. Certainly we should be strong enough to whip them both.

— The Pittsburgh Courier

The Pittsburgh Courier was one of the most influential African-American newspapers of WWII, and the source of what came to be called the Double V Campaign. A letter to the editor of the paper in 1941 asked why a "half American" should sacrifice his life in the war and suggested that Blacks should seek a double victory. "The first V for a victory over our enemies from without, the second V for a victory over our enemies from within." The idea would become a national cause, and eventually extend into a call for action in the factories and services that supported the war effort.

Despite a high enlistment rate in the U.S. Army, African Americans were still not treated equally. At parades, church services, in transportation and canteens, they were kept separate. Historians have acknowledged that the U.S. military imposed domestic views on race overseas by discouraging local populations from interacting with African-American troops, and punishing African Americans for interracial sexual encounters.

=== Stuttgart and preceding effects ===
The Stuttgart incident took place in April 1945 when around a thousand German women and girls were herded into underground tunnels in the German city of Stuttgart and sexually assaulted over the course of several days. African troops were quick to be blamed—the perpetrators were Africans from French colonies serving in the French Army, and no Americans were involved.

This incident had the potential to threaten a peaceful post-war American occupation of Germany. Therefore, the US military adopted public relations tactics of blaming sexual violence exclusively on African-American soldiers, thereby contributing to the discrimination towards Black US soldiers.

==== FEPC's argument after the Stuttgart incident ====
For segregationists the Stuttgart incident and other incidents of interracial sexual encounters provided weaponization for segregationist Southern politicians to fight against steps taken to lessen discrimination in the US military and federal organisations. Established by executive order in 1941, the FEPC banned discrimination in federal employment on the basis of race, colour, creed, or national origin, with black activists eager to see it established by congressional legislation as a permanent entity.

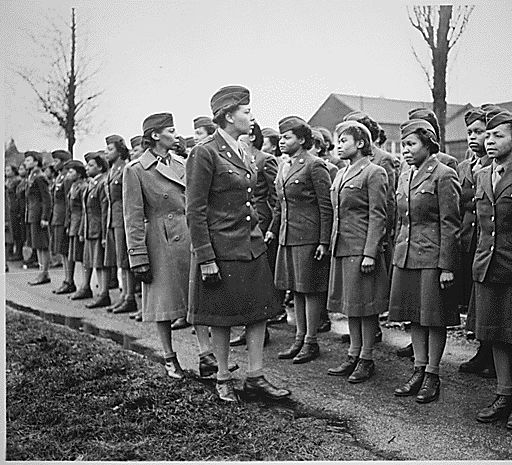
Somewhere in England, Maj. Charity E. Adams, Columbia, S.C., and Capt. Abbie N. Campbell, Tuskegee Institute, Tuskegee, Ala., inspect the first contingent of negro members of the Women's Army Corps assigned to overseas service, February 15, 1945.

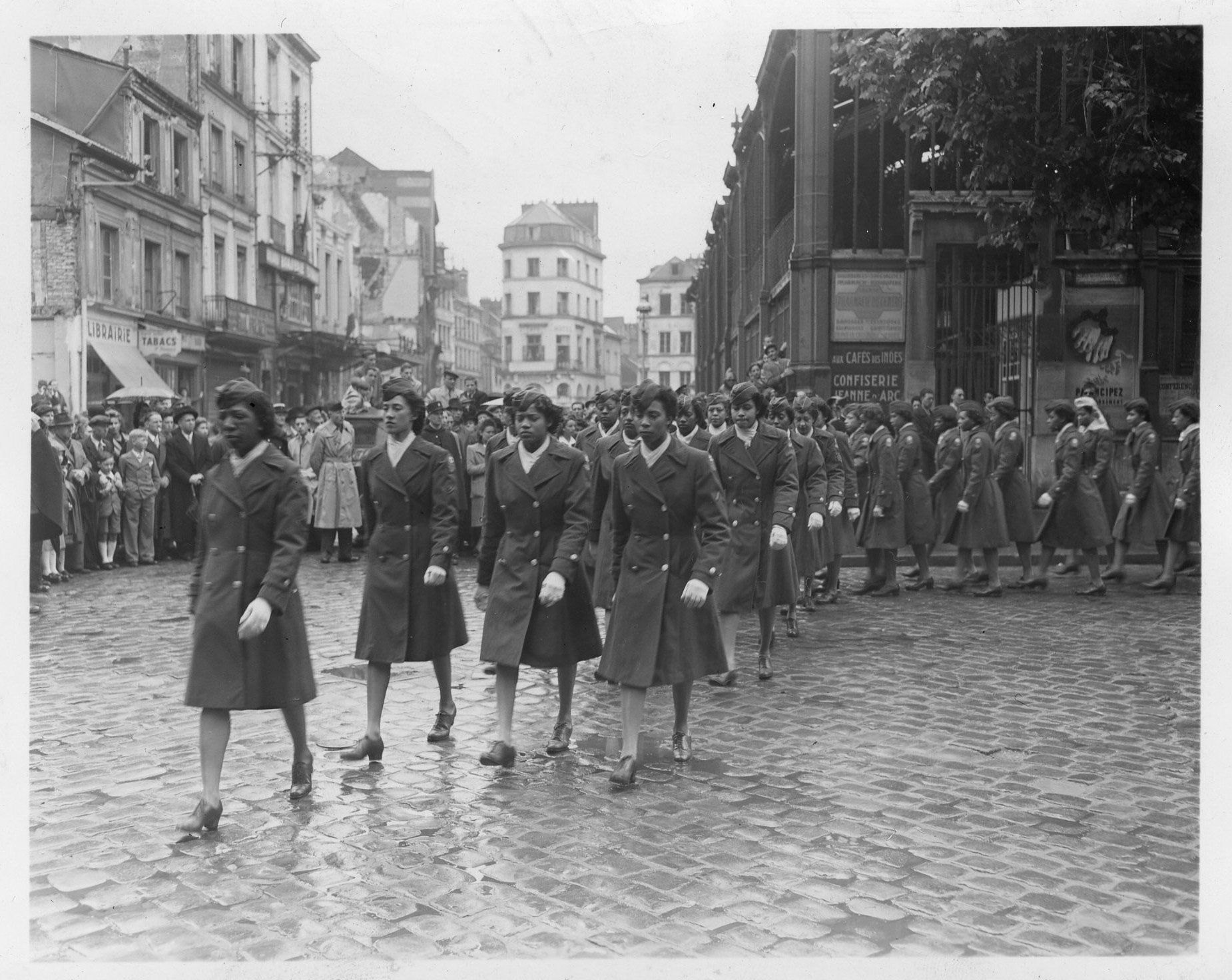
General view of parade which followed ceremony in honor of Jean D'Arc, at the market place where she was burned at the stake. It was the negro WAC battalion's first parade on the continent. Rouen, France, May 27, 1945.

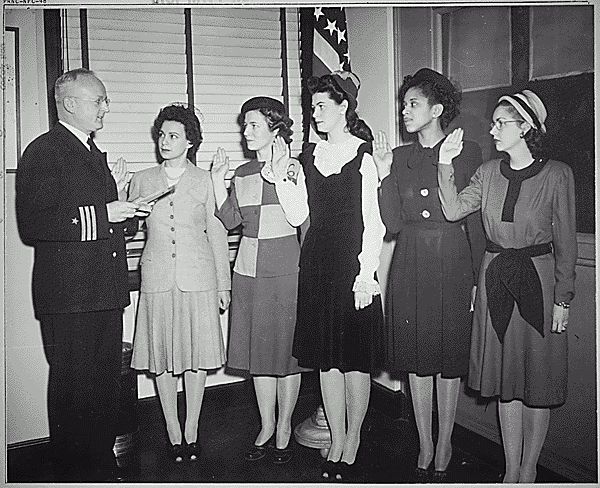
Phyllis Mae Dailey was sworn into the United States Navy Nurse Corps as the first African-American servicewoman in World War II.

Politicians like Senator James Eastland, however, saw this development in the FEPC not only as an insult to the returning white soldier but also a gateway for communist and immoral influence within federal government. Here discriminatory treatment toward African American soldiers and employees was shown by Senator Eastland projecting the narrative of sexualised violence to make a connection between soldiers of color that were accused of rape, and the black veterans who were given beneficiaries of the FEPC. Claiming in his own words that the same 'racial characteristics are common to the members of the same race', referring to Black Americans.

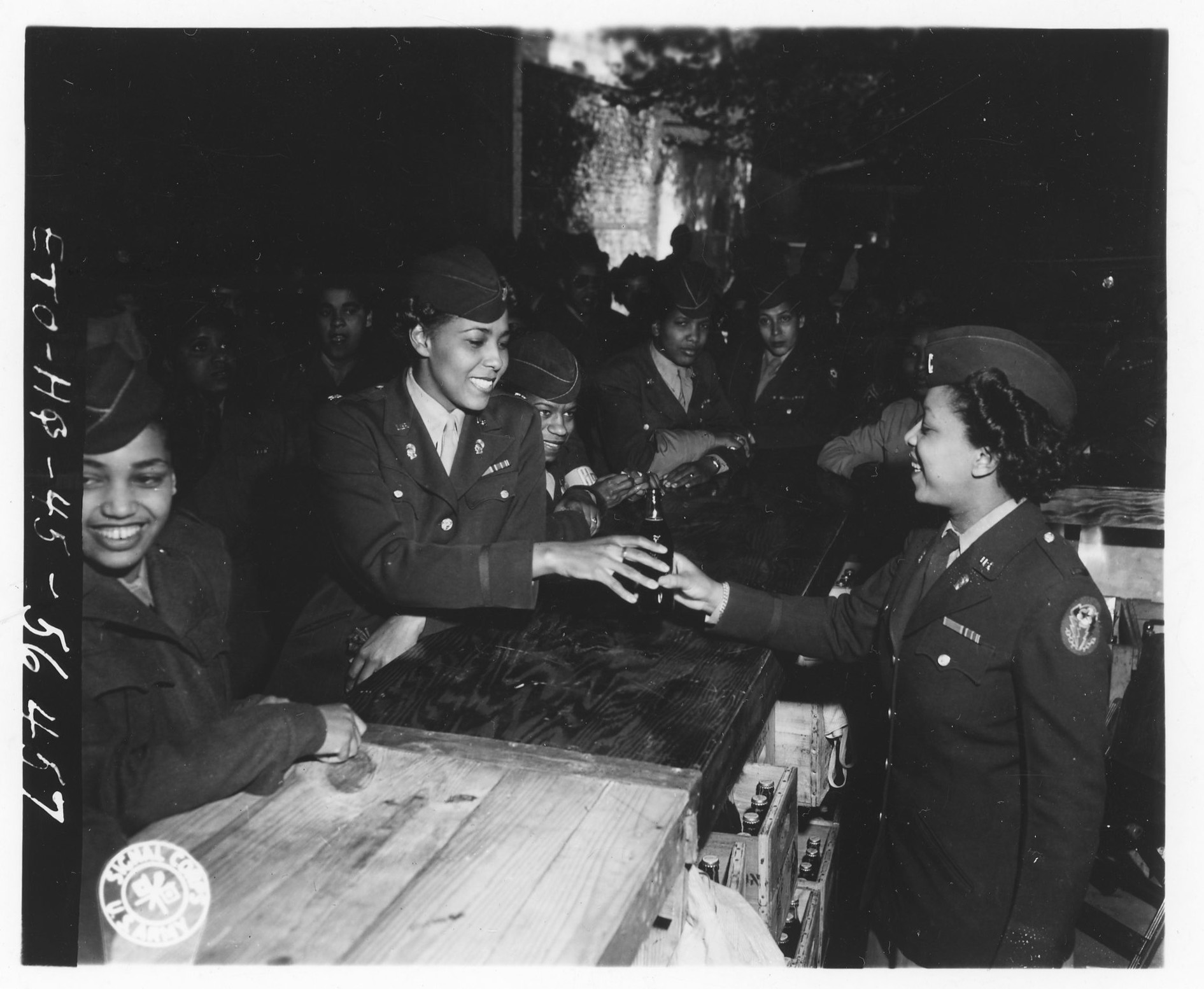
Right to left: 2nd Lt. Freda le Beau (New Orleans, LA), post exchange officer, serves the first Coca-Cola to Major Charity Adams (Columbia, South Carolina), at the grand opening of the WAC battalion's new snack bar. Rouen, France, July 1, 1945.

=== African-American women soldiers in WWII ===
Many African-American women served in the military during World War II in the Women's Army Corps or WAC. African-American women who served in the 6888th Central Postal Directory Battalion were stationed overseas in England and France.

A quota of only 48 nurses was set for African-American women, and they were segregated from white nurses and white soldiers for much of the war. Eventually more black nurses enlisted. They were assigned to care for black soldiers. Black nurses were integrated into everyday life with their white colleagues.

The first African-American woman sworn into the Navy Nurse Corps was Phyllis Mae Dailey, a Columbia University student from New York. She was the first of only four African-American women to serve as a Navy nurse during World War II.

=== African-American soldiers in WW II combat ===
Many black American soldiers served their country with distinction during World War II. There were 125,000 African Americans who were overseas in World War II (6.25% of all abroad soldiers). Throughout the war a total of 708 African Americans were killed in combat. Famous segregated units, such as the Tuskegee Airmen and 761st Tank Battalion and the lesser-known but equally distinguished 452nd Anti-Aircraft Artillery Battalion, proved their value in combat, and 2800 black troops who volunteered as replacements in the winter of 1944 not only served their country, but also their people in the fight for desegregation of all U.S. armed forces. This was finally done by order of President Harry S. Truman in July 1948 via Executive Order 9981.

=== Black Americans in the Navy ===
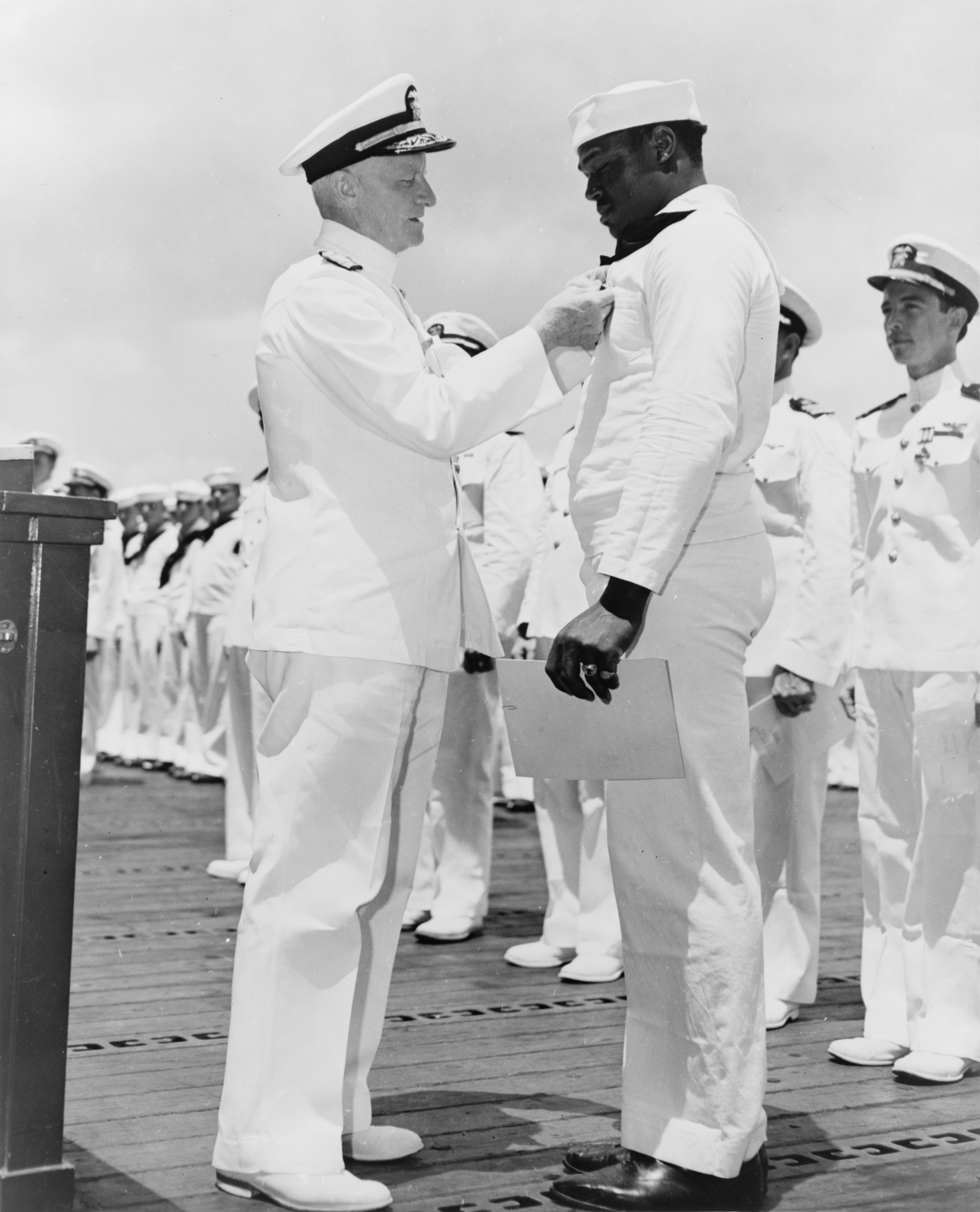
Admiral Chester W. Nimitz pins Navy Cross on Doris Miller, at ceremony on board a warship in Pearl Harbor, May 27, 1942.

The Navy, with its WASP, white-shoe tradition, was the least hospitable to men of color of any of the armed services. Having barred African-Americans from enlisting in the Navy at all since 1919, at the opening of WWII, black men could not be sailors, not serve in combat units, not serve overseas, nor step one foot onto a fleet capital ship unless they had a separate "Stewards" rating. "The Navy was firm, and mostly successful" notes the naval curator for National World War Museum, "in its efforts to keep African Americans in menial roles." For many, enlisting in the Navy was a rude awakening to an even more segregated and demeaning life than they'd had as civilians. They slept in separate quarters, were treated poorly and their "Steward" branch gave limited opportunity for advancement – known as the "Messman" branch. Serving in the Navy for a black man meant literally serving: they waited on tables, did the cooking and cleaned up after white officers. In fact, white sailors were not allowed to join the Messman Branch, which might also contain Chinese or Filipinos.

However, in a world war being fought on a planet two-thirds covered in water, the Navy was bound to change. By June, 1942, enlisted black men were given sailor rates, if not sailor status and by June, 1945, as the Navy hopped from island to bloody island, 165,000 black men (and some women) were serving overseas. Of these, 72,000 were still in steward class, but others were put on some construction jobs or work in shore stations.

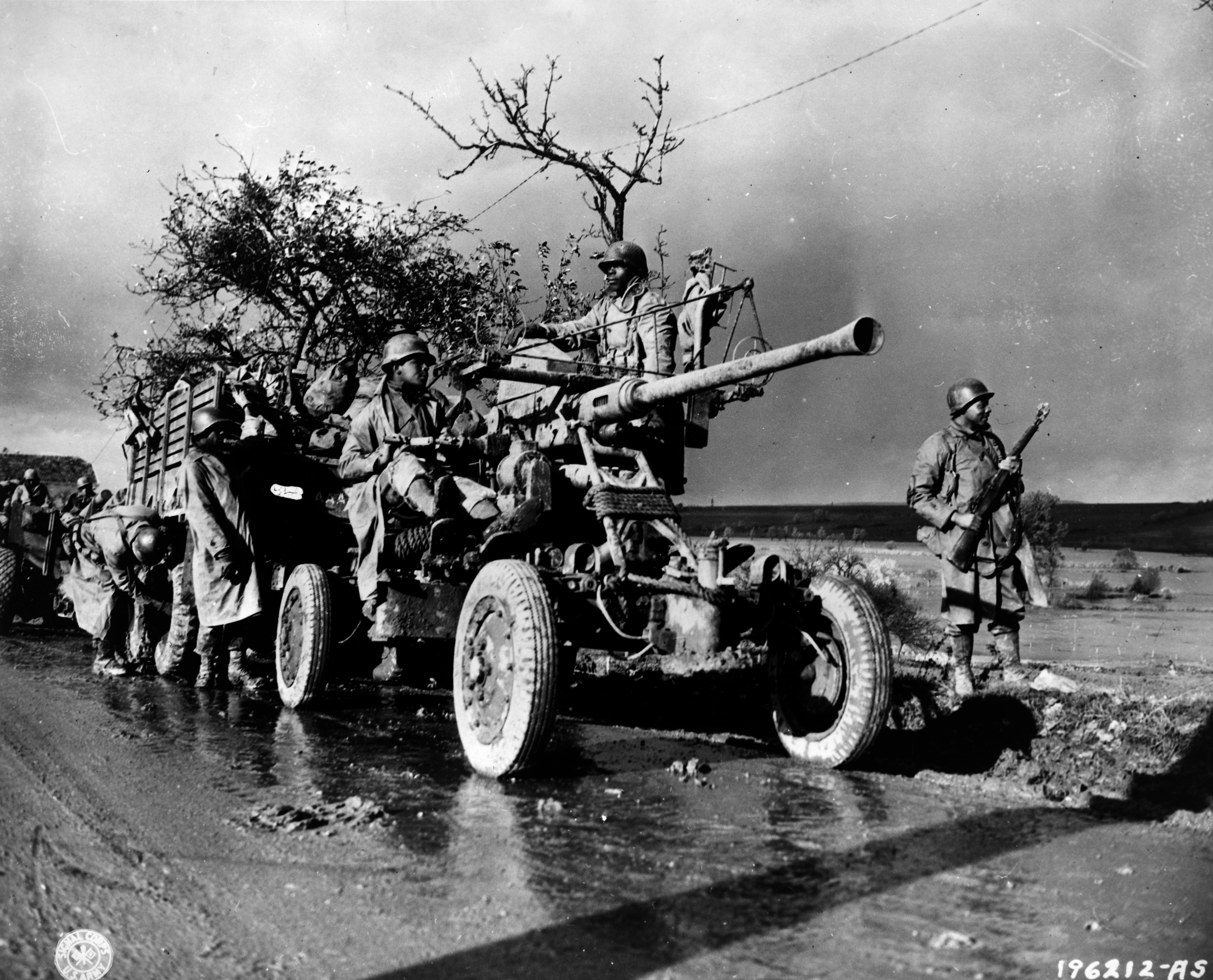
Battery A of the 452nd AAA Battalion, November 9, 1944

The first African Americans to serve in the modern Navy at any general rank were the members of the Navy B-1 Band, which was the Navy's first African American band, formed during World War II. Before the intervention of President Franklin Roosevelt in 1941, black Americans were only allowed in the Navy as kitchen help. The formation of this band marked a pivotal moment in Navy history, as it was the first time African Americans served at any general rank outside of kitchen duties. The band, composed initially of 45 members, served as a beacon of change and left a lasting legacy both within the Navy and the Chapel Hill community, where they were stationed. Their story, though not widely known, reflects a significant stride towards racial integration in the U.S. military.

The Port Chicago disaster on July 17, 1944, was an explosion of about 2,000 tons of ammunition as it was being loaded onto ships by black Navy stevedores under pressure from their white officers who were having a contest to see how quickly the men could load the ammo by hand, rather than using the lift. This obvious violation of safety regulations, instigated entirely by white officers, led to a massive explosion that killed 320 military and civilian workers, most of them black. The blatant disregard for the black Navy men's safety led to the Port Chicago Mutiny, the only case of a full military trial for mutiny in the history of the U.S. Navy. This was against 50 black stevedores who refused to continue loading ammunition under the same dangerous conditions. The trial was observed by the then-young lawyer and future Supreme Court Justice Thurgood Marshall and ended in conviction of all of the defendants. However, the trial was immediately criticized for not abiding by the applicable laws on mutiny, and became influential in the discussion of desegregation.

During the Attack on Pearl Harbor, Doris Miller, the valiant Navy mess attendant, who, with no weapons training at all, grabbed an anti-aircraft gun and started firing upon Japanese aircraft until he ran out of ammunition. Even after the incident, he felt the sting of racial injustice despite his instant fame. He was not acknowledged for this act of service for six months by navy officials, with black journalists having to campaign for his recognition until he became the first African-American recipient of the Navy Cross, awarded for his actions during the attack on Pearl Harbor. Nonetheless, the Navy still refused to identify Miller for another three months and rebuffed calls for Miller to come to shore and receive the award from President Roosevelt in person.

The story of Miller was one that was often repeated time and time again with other African-American sailors whose awardings of the Navy Cross were delayed until decades after the conflict ceased. Alonzo Swann and Eugene Smith were given Navy Crosses decades after the men enlisted in the Navy for their quick action as anti-aircraft gunners aboard the USS Intrepid. The teenaged Swann and Smith, manning Gun Tub No. 10, shot down an incoming Kamikaze pilot as the ship coasted through the Leyte Gulf. All but twenty of his fellow sailors bailed from their posts. Even as the remaining gunmen were successful in shooting down the pilot, the resulting crash killed nine men and injured six. Official Naval news releases were sent out announcing the award of the Navy Cross but the high honor was crossed out and replaced by the words "Bronze Star metals [sic]." This was then rectified in 1993 and 1994 respectively.

Several sailors of this era reported a similar story of their contribution to fighting in the conflict being overlooked in history such as Steward's Mate, 2nd class James Killebrew, who manned a 20mm gun on board the USS Tennessee and helped defend the boat from attacking aircraft in the battles of Leyte Gulf, Iwo Jima, and Okinawa. He reports that his story was not at all unusual, and that several other African Americans would volunteer to see combat in spite of their status as steward's mates or messmen.

A rarely mentioned facet of African American efforts in the Navy is that of black sailors stationed in submarines. While a volunteer-only position, many African Americans sought the job out due to the extra pay the hazardous job's crewmates received. While still stewards, those in the submarine fleet also served as ammunition passers, were assigned to gun crews, manned the helm, bow, or stern planes, and assisted with reloading torpedoes. They also reported more camaraderie with their white counterparts due to submarine crews' close proximity with each other in daily operation, unlike the surface vessel black sailors who faced extreme prejudice.

The Coast Guard offered opportunities to actually serve on boats, and on April 14, 1943, Joseph C. Jenkins became the first African-American commissioned officer in the United States Coast Guard. He was soon joined by Clarence Samuels on August 31, 1943, and then Harvey C. Russell Jr. in February 1944.

In March 1944, Paul Richmond, a member of the Naval Reserve and a recent Annapolis graduate, under Commander Armstrong, set up a Naval officer training school in the Great Lakes Naval Training Center for black men to become commissioned Naval officers in a mere two and a half months, paralleling the "90-day-wonders" for Army officers. His first 13 graduates had been through basic training and gone to college, but some of them had never been on a boat. Known as the Golden Thirteen, they became the Navy's first African-American commissioned officers. Samuel L. Gravely, Jr. became a commissioned officer the same year; he would later be the first African American to command a US warship, and the first to become an admiral.

World War II began with the individual branches having their own air corps, as they were known and these were as segregated as everything else in the army. Benjamin O. Davis Jr. served as commander of the Tuskegee Airmen, whose story of determination to fly in an army air corps that would not hear of it. He went on to become the first African-American general in the United States Air Force. His father, Benjamin O. Davis Sr., was the first African-American brigadier general in the Army (1940).

=== Black men in combat ===
African-American soldiers might have been allowed to carry rifles, but they were not allowed to shoot them. However, in the midst of the Battle of the Bulge in December 1944, General Eisenhower was severely short of replacement troops for the rapidly depleting all-white companies. Lieutenant General John C. H. Lee, General Eisenhower's deputy commander, ETO, provided a perfect solution when he suggested using the African American servicemen in the European theater to volunteer as infantry replacements. The call went out on December 26, and by February, more than 5,000 had volunteered to be combat riflemen. Eisenhower was quietly using this as an experiment in integrated combat troops, and, worried that the non-combat but nonetheless vital service jobs of black troops would be shortchanged. He decided to use 2,800. The black volunteers were organized into 53 platoons, which, while segregated and under the command of a white sergeant and a white officer, the platoons themselves were each placed within larger all-white divisions in the First Army, two of them armoured. Thus, for almost the first time, black and white American men were fighting side by side.

The brutal fighting on the Continent did more to desegregate the Army than anything else. The army began to run out of white officers almost for what would become 850,000 black troops and a segregated Officer Candidate School was opened for Black men with some college experience. By 1945, a handful of these black officer candidates men were being housed and trained with white officers, a tiny minority, to be sure, but nonetheless a technically integrated officer corps for the first time in the war.

In 1944, George Patton, charging across France, and desperate for more tanks for his Third Army, was told by the War Department that the only tank unit left in the entire country was the 761st, who were "Negro." "Who the hell asked for color?" Patton snapped, "I asked for tankers." He got them. The 800 men of the 761st tank group operated 54 M4 Sherman tanks in three companies and called themselves the "Black Panthers." Patton welcomed them with typical bluntness: "Men, you are the first Negro tankers ever to fight in the American army. I would never have asked for you if you were not good. I have nothing but the best in my army. I don't care what color you are as long as you go up there and kill those Krauts." By the end of the war, the 761st were known as Patton's Panthers; they had been in combat for 183 continuous days, fought in four major Allied campaigns in six different countries, starting with the Battle of the Bulge, and had inflicted more than 130,000 casualties on the enemy.

Eight black enlisted men received battlefield commissions (meaning they were given a higher rank on the battlefield) while 391 received decorations for heroism, including one Medal of Honor awarded posthumously in 1997 to Sergeant Ruben Rivers, who threw himself in front of a burning tank to save the other tankers; there were seven Silver Stars, 56 Bronze Stars, and 246 Purple Hearts. Three officers and 31 enlisted men had been killed in action, and 22 officers and 180 enlisted men had been wounded. In 1998, the 761st Tank Battalion received a much delayed Presidential Unit Citation.

In the meantime, the volunteer infantrymen in their increasingly-less segregated platoons worked out so well that an Army survey of 256 of their white officers (in the summer of 1945; this was Eisenhower further under-the-table exploration of integrated infantry, still a very sensitive topic) found that "100 percent of the officers and 98 percent of the enlisted men responded positively that Blacks, fighting side by side with Whites, had performed well," as. 86 percent of White officers and 92 percent of White platoon sergeants and men stated that Black soldiers fought "just the same" or "better than White troops." What's more, their commanders reported surprise on how well the men from these two races got along, particularly when fighting side by side.

Colored Troops in Japanese territory during Bougainville Campaign, 1 May 1944

These black infantry volunteers continued to fight with the First Army into Germany right through V-E Day. Then half were let go; the other half, despite their protests, returned to the grind of "support jobs," still essential in mopping up what was left of Europe. Of the 900,000 African Americans in the US Army, deployed in over a thousand units to North Africa, Italy, Europe, and the Pacific, these volunteers were part of the very few – only 3 percent – who were in combat outfits, and of those, even fewer engaged in actual combat.

Officer training continued to expand to create hundreds of African-American officers in all branches. Before the U.S. entered the war in 1941, there were only five black officers. By the end of the war, there were 7,000 In 1945, Frederick C. Branch became the first African-American United States Marine Corps officer. However, in the still-segregated military, African-American officers were not allowed to command white troops until Truman integrated the troops in 1948.

A blue plaque commemorating the contribution of African-American soldiers based in Wales during World War II was installed by the Nubian Jak Community Trust at RAF Carew Cheriton on the 75th anniversary of the D-Day landings, June 6, 2019.

The presence of African-American soldiers in the U.K. and subsequent encounters with the native population have been shown to have reduced the racial prejudice against black people, if only, in some cases, decades later, and, for the most part, African American soldiers were more welcome in the countries of European Allies than U.S. officials wished them to be. In the U.K especially, generally all GIs were commended for their generosity and bravery, and in some cases, the British public gained a special affection for African American soldiers that were thought to have better manners than the white Americans.

As in World War I, Black soldiers were primarily channeled to support labor, most of them as members of the Quartermaster Corps. The best-known work of the Quartermaster Corps in World War II was the brief Red Ball Express, which ferried food, supplies and fuel along the rapid advance of Allied forces from the Normandy Invasion to the incursion into Germany. Six thousand trucks operating 24 hours a day, most with two African American drivers on circular routes carried 400,000 tons of supplies through increasingly liberated Europe between August 25 and November 16, 1944. The work was relentless, exhausting and dangerous, and credited with helping to bring about the ultimate success of the Normandy Invasion. A 1952 movie, The Red Ball Express, brought more attention to the effort, but underplayed its African American aspect.

Among the least appealing of quartermaster responsibilities was burial of the dead and the construction of temporary and permanent cemeteries. Handling corpses, especially in jungle torpor, is dirty, hot work, and a source of infections. However, the Quartermaster units assigned to this grim duty did so with dignity, creating simple grave-markers in clear spaces, often quietly standing by the graves, the only mourners when a fallen soldier is laid to rest.

=== Units ===
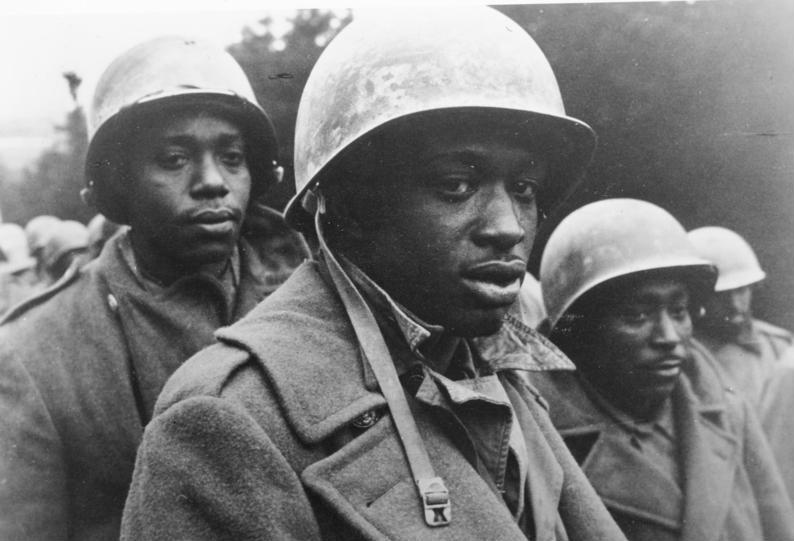
333rd Field Artillery Battalion African-Americans captured during the Battle of the Bulge, December 1944

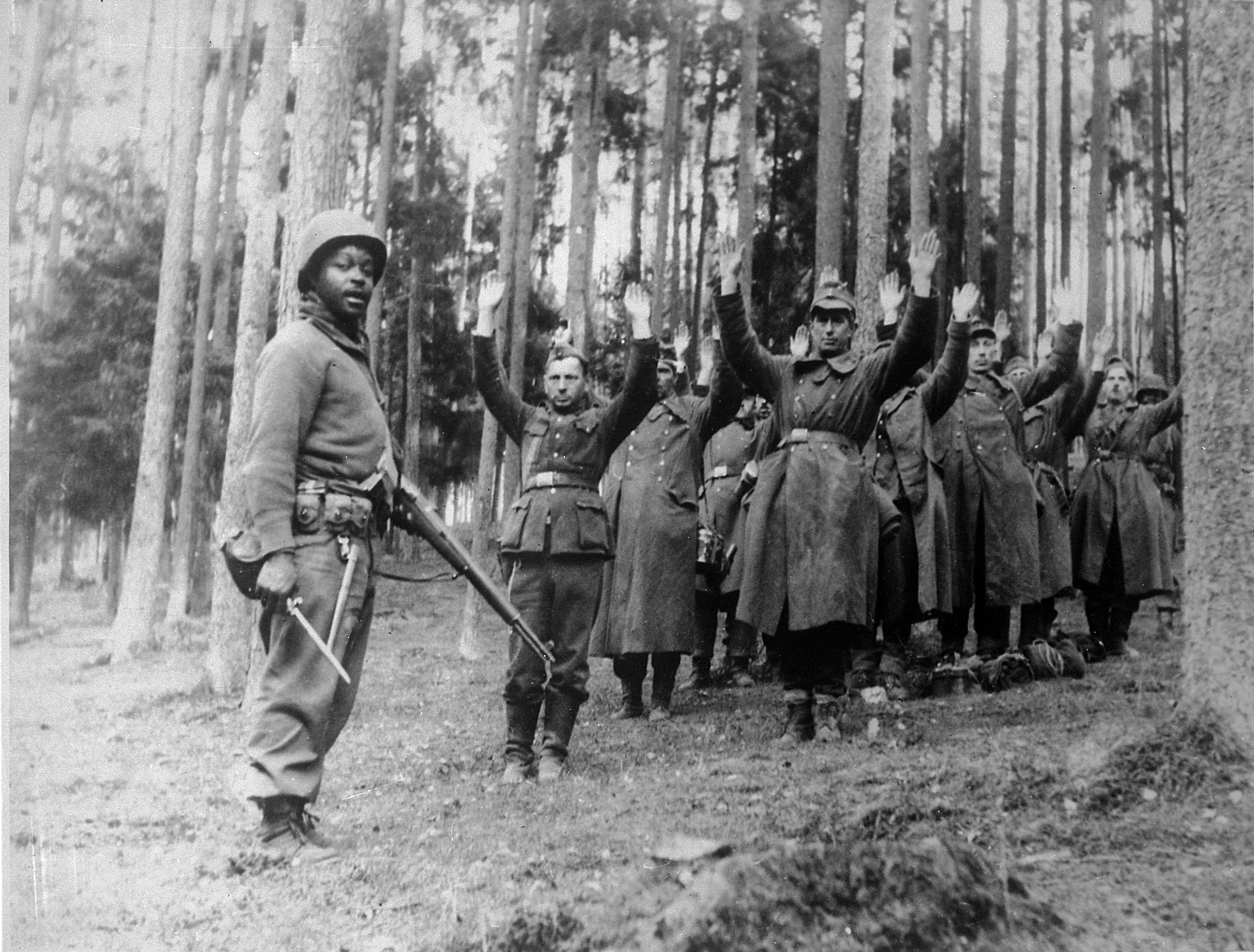
12th Armored Division soldier with German prisoners of war, April 1945

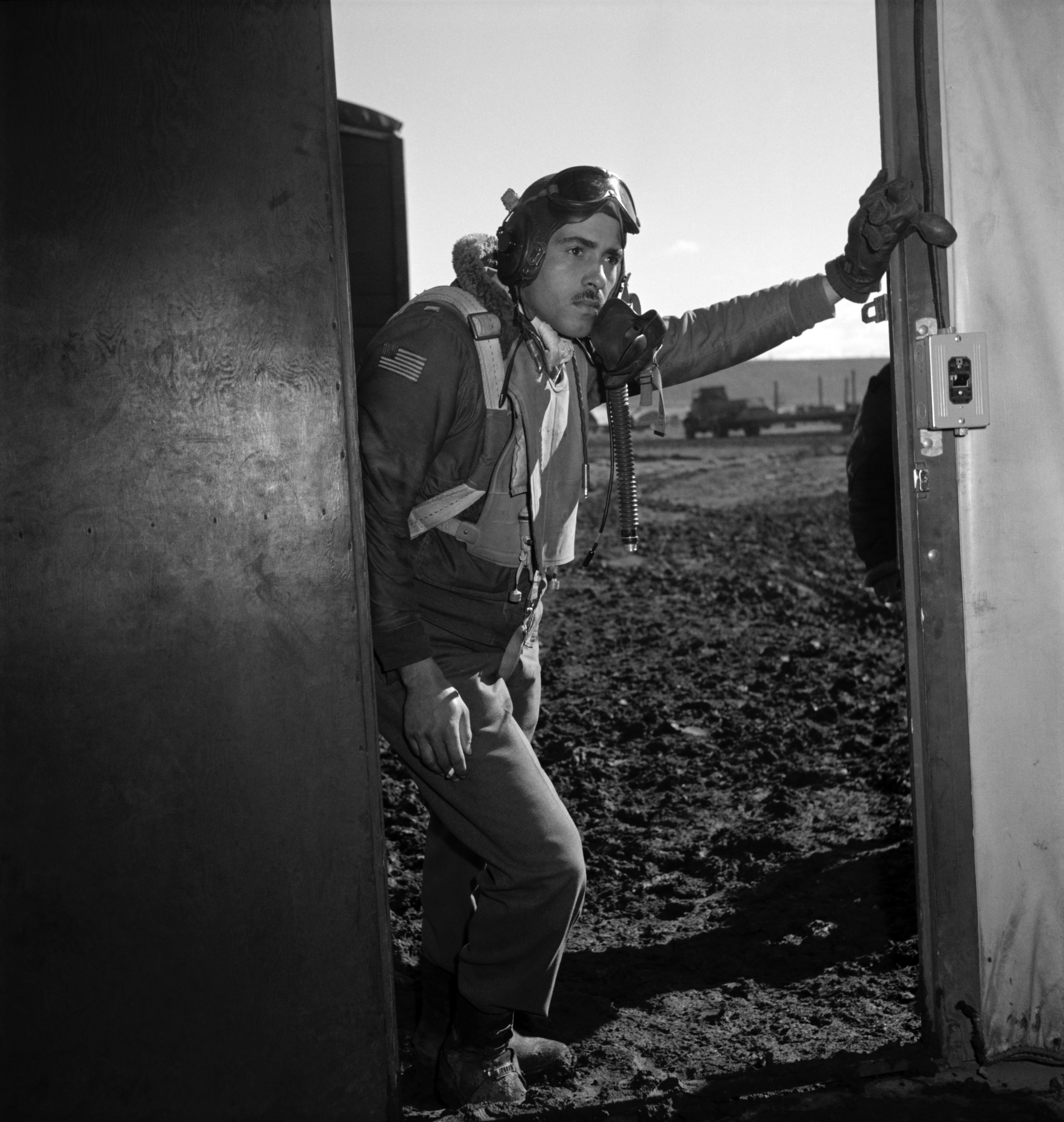
The Tuskegee Airmen were the first African-American pilots in United States military history; they flew with distinction during World War II. Portrait of Tuskegee airman Edward M. Thomas by photographer Toni Frissell, March 1945.

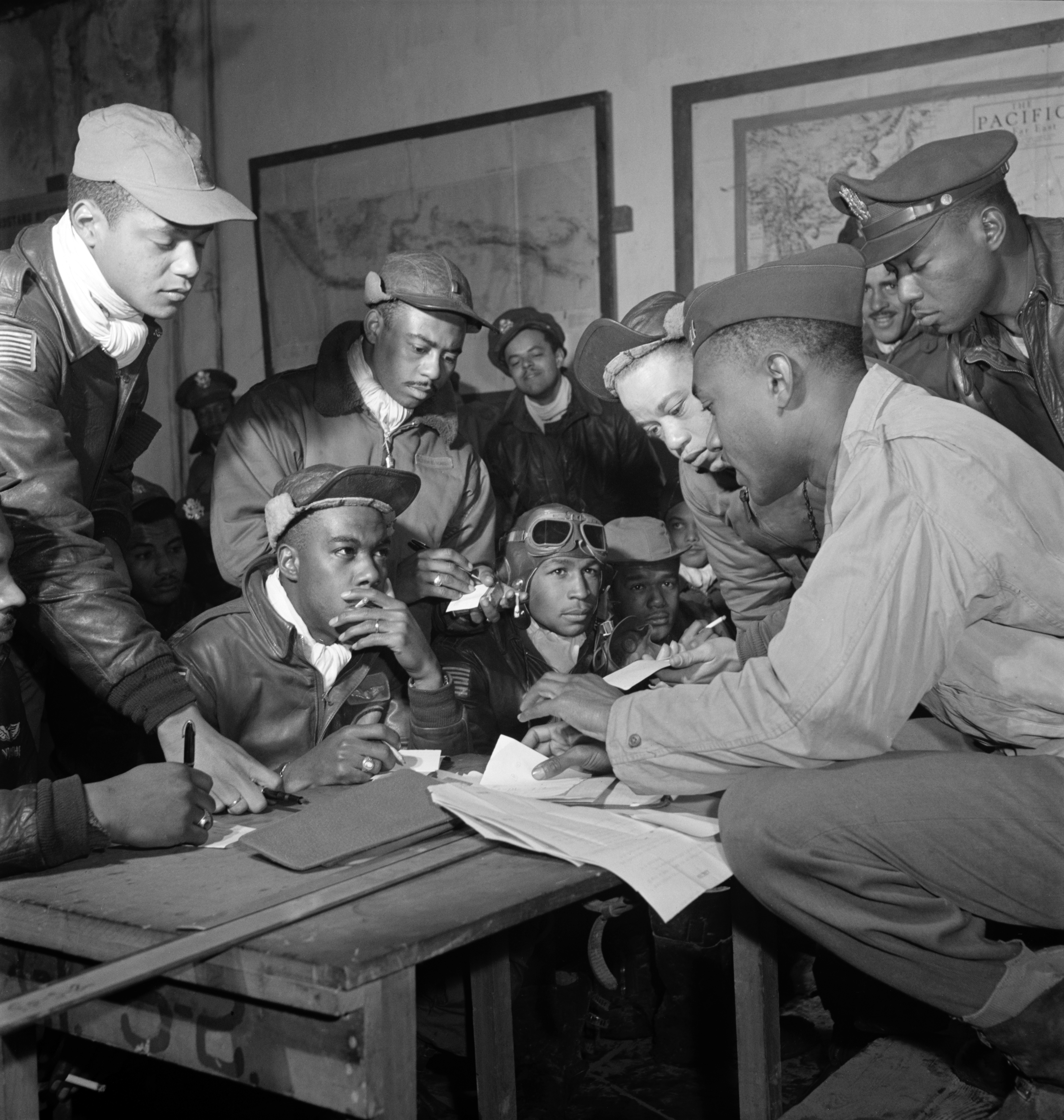
Several Tuskegee airmen at Ramitelli, Italy, March 1945

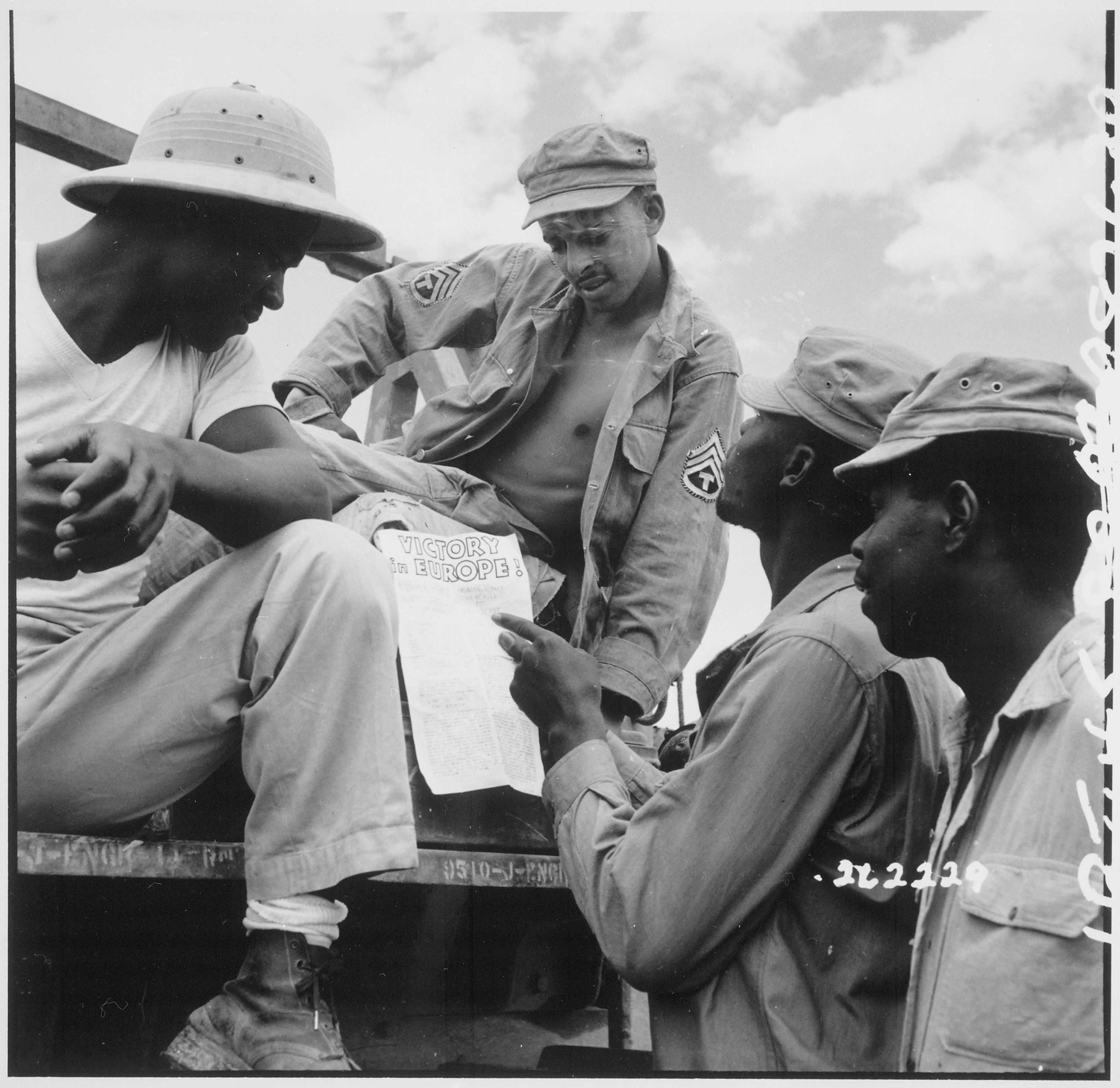
African-American soldiers in Burma stop work briefly to read President Truman's Proclamation of Victory in Europe, May 9, 1945.

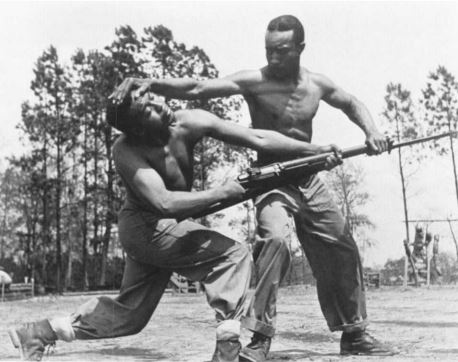
Unarmed combat training Marine Corps Base Montford Point (NARA)

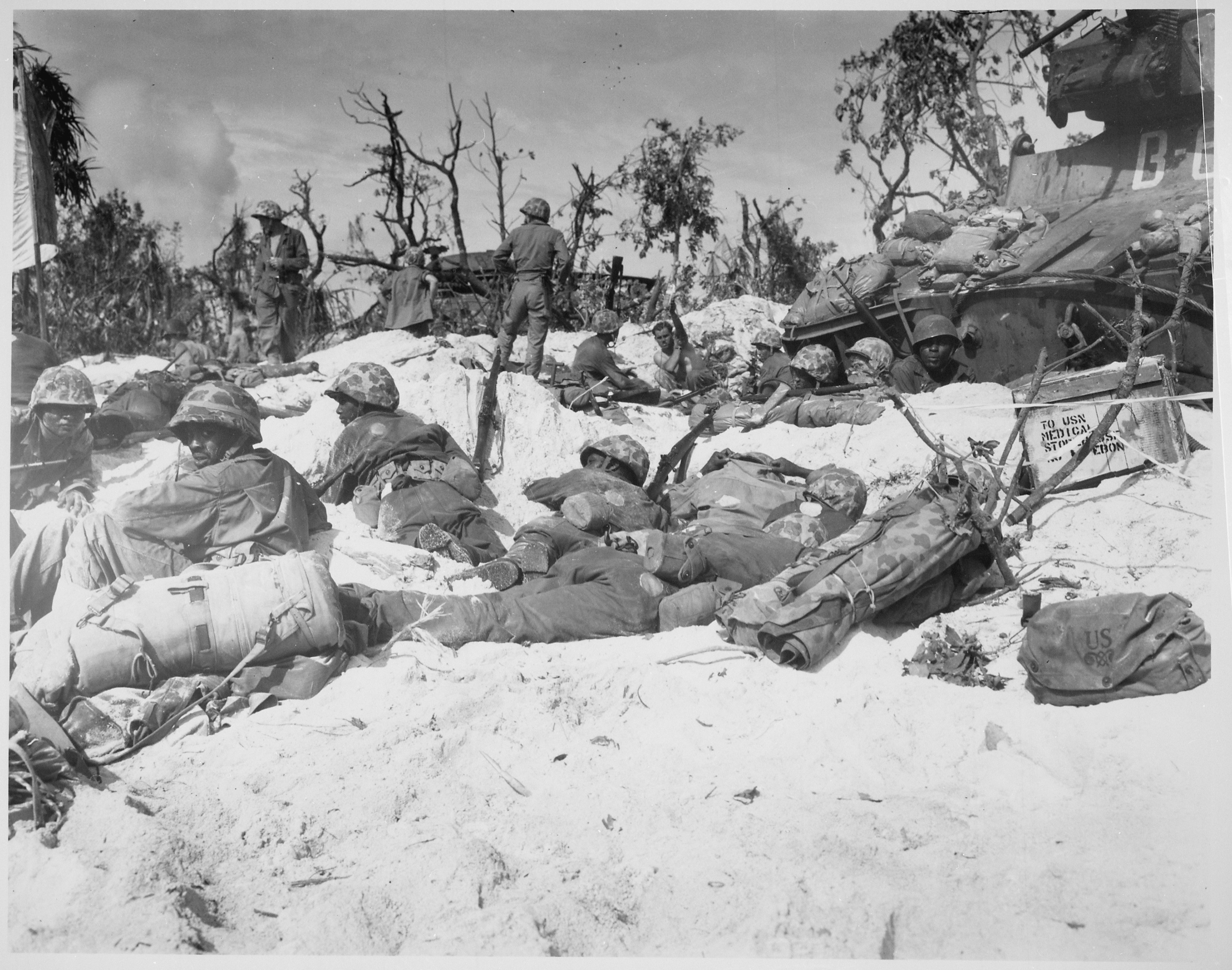
D-Day, Peleliu, African Americans of one of the two segregated units that supported the 7th Marines – the 16th Marine Field Depot or the 17th Naval Construction Battalion Special take a break in the 115 °F (46 °C) heat, September 15, 1944 – NARA – 532535

Army:

- 92nd Infantry Division
  - 366th Infantry Regiment
  - 370th Infantry Regiment
- 93rd Infantry Division
  - 369th Infantry Regiment
  - 371st Infantry Regiment
- 2nd Cavalry Division
  - 4th Cavalry Brigade
    - 10th Cavalry Regiment
    - 27th Cavalry Regiment
  - 5th Cavalry Brigade
    - 9th Cavalry Regiment
    - 28th Cavalry Regiment
- Non Divisional Units
  - Barrage Balloon Unit
    - 320th Barrage Balloon Battalion
  - Anti-Aircraft Artillery Unit
    - 452nd Anti-Aircraft Artillery Battalion
  - Infantry Units
    - 555th Parachute Infantry Battalion
  - Cavalry/Armor Units
    - US Military Academy Cavalry Squadron
    - 5th Reconnaissance Squadron
    - 758th Tank Battalion
    - 761st Tank Battalion
    - 784th Tank Battalion
  - Field Artillery Units
    - 46th Field Artillery Brigade
    - 184th Field Artillery Regiment, Illinois National Guard
    - 333rd Field Artillery Regiment
    - 349th Field Artillery Regiment
    - 350th Field Artillery Regiment
    - 351st Field Artillery Regiment
    - 353rd Field Artillery Regiment
    - 578th Field Artillery Regiment
    - 333rd Field Artillery Battalion
    - 349th Field Artillery Battalion
    - 350th Field Artillery Battalion
    - 351st Field Artillery Battalion
    - 353rd Field Artillery Battalion
    - 578th Field Artillery Battalion
    - 593rd Field Artillery Battalion
    - 594th Field Artillery Battalion
    - 595th Field Artillery Battalion
    - 596th Field Artillery Battalion
    - 597th Field Artillery Battalion
    - 598th Field Artillery Battalion
    - 599th Field Artillery Battalion
    - 600th Field Artillery Battalion
    - 686th Field Artillery Battalion
    - 777th Field Artillery Battalion
    - 795th Field Artillery Battalion
    - 930th Field Artillery Battalion
    - 931st Field Artillery Battalion
    - 969th Field Artillery Battalion
    - 971st Field Artillery Battalion
    - 973rd Field Artillery Battalion
    - 993rd Field Artillery Battalion
    - 999th Field Artillery Battalion
  - Tank Destroyer Units
    - 614th Tank Destroyer Battalion
    - 646th Tank Destroyer Battalion
    - 649th Tank Destroyer Battalion
    - 659th Tank Destroyer Battalion
    - 669th Tank Destroyer Battalion
    - 679th Tank Destroyer Battalion
    - 795th Tank Destroyer Battalion
    - 827th Tank Destroyer Battalion
    - 828th Tank Destroyer Battalion
    - 829th Tank Destroyer Battalion
    - 846th Tank Destroyer Battalion

Army Air Corps:

- 332nd Fighter Group (Tuskegee Airmen)
- 477th Bombardment Group

United States Marine Corps

- 51st Defense Battalion
- 52nd Defense Battalion
- 63 USMC Depot and Ammunition Companies were segregated.
  - 16th Marine Field Depot
    - 7th Marine Depot Company
    - 11th Marine Ammunition Company

United States Navy

- USS Mason (DE-529)
- USS PC-1264
- Naval Ordinance Battalions (stevedore)

United States Navy Seabees

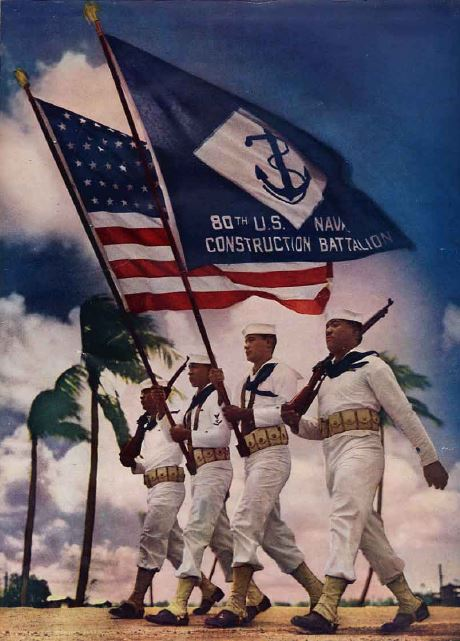
80th Seabees color guard

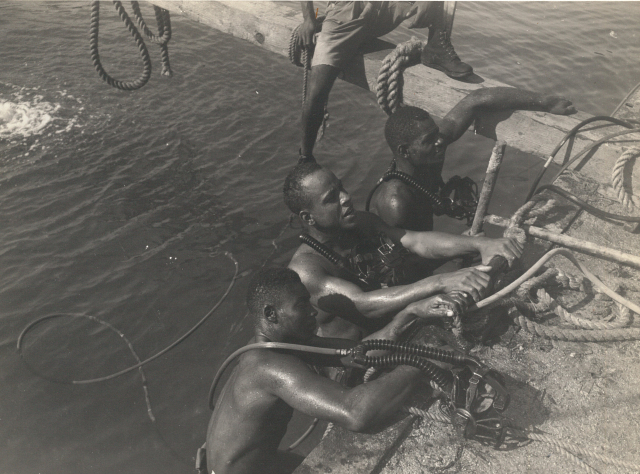
Seabee divers of the 34th CB at Gavutu in the Solomon Islands, 8 November 1943, installing a marine railway

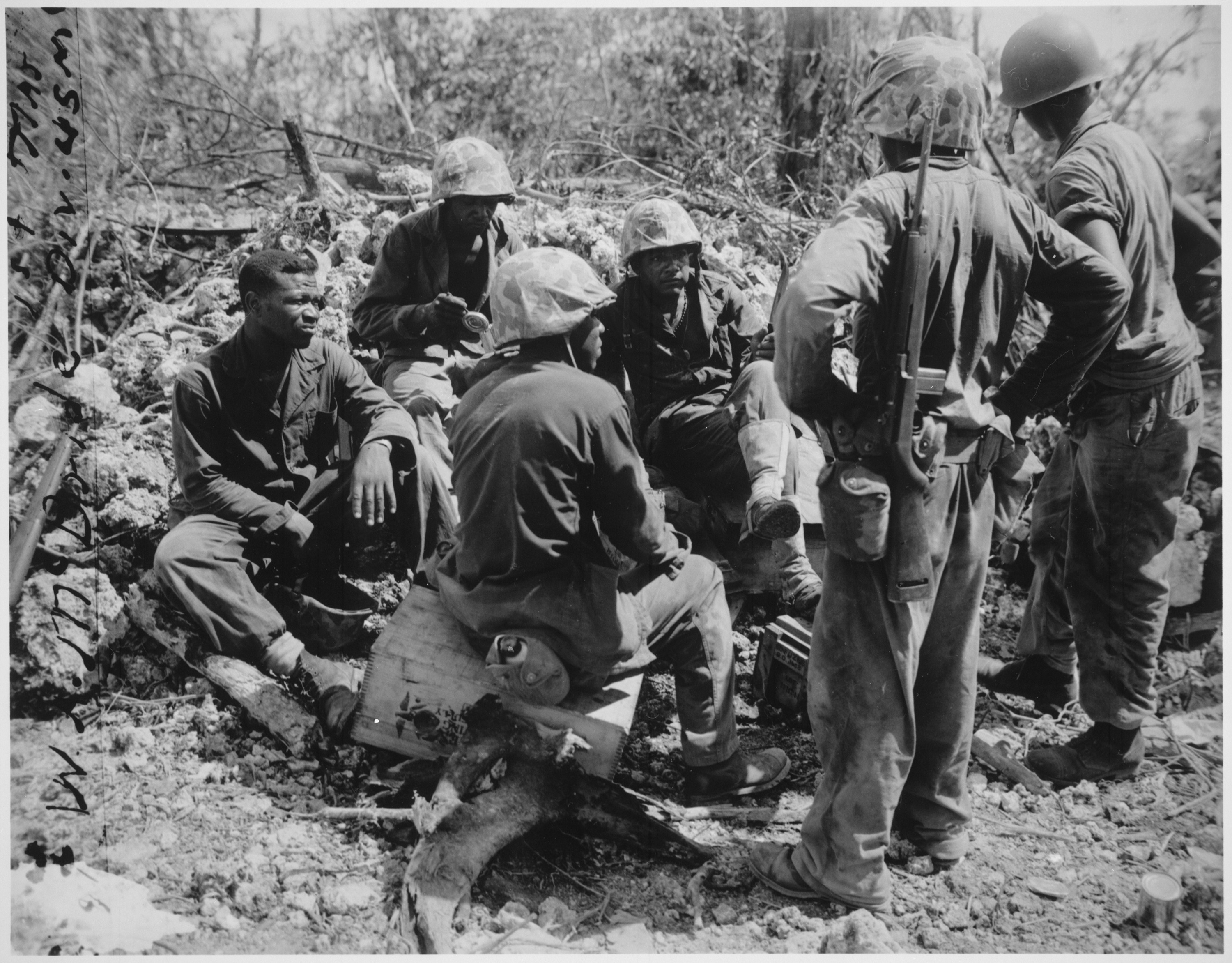
"17th Special" Seabees with the 7th Marines on Peleliu made national news in an official U.S. Navy press release. NARA-532537

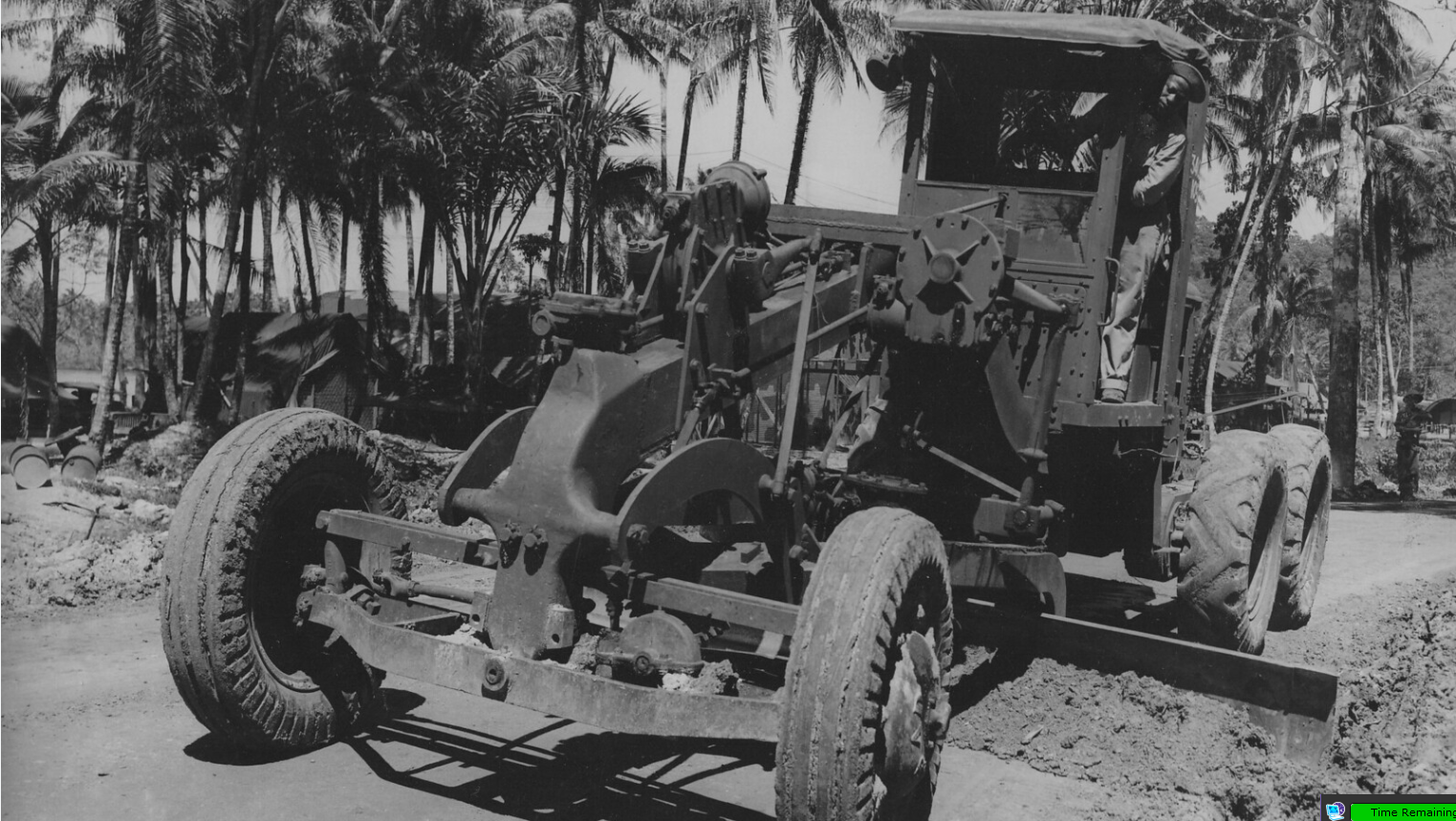
A Seabee of the 34th CB finishing a road

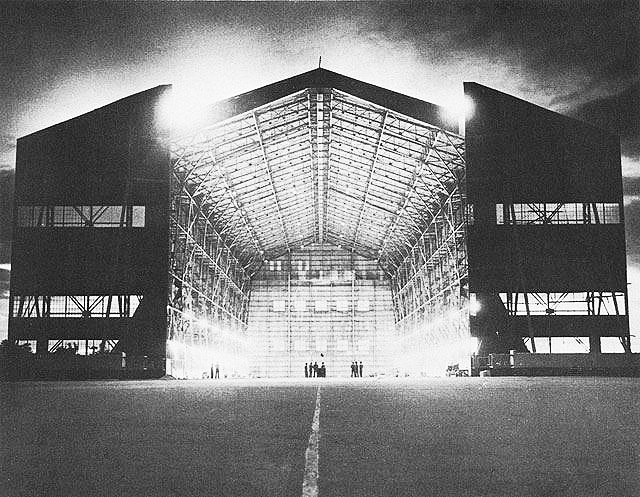
LTA airship Hangar built by the 80th CB at Carlsen Air Force Base on Trinidad

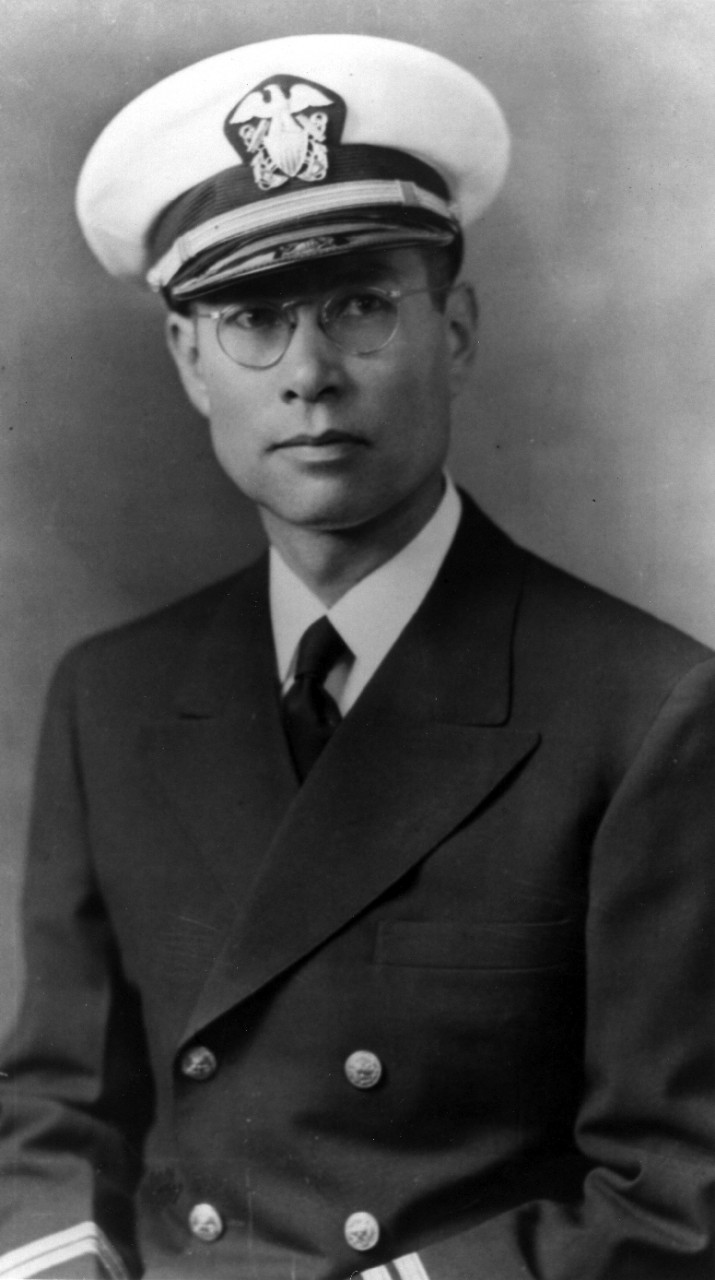
Lt Cmdr. Edward Swain Hope CEC of the Seabee officer corps was the most senior African American officer in the United States Navy during WWII. He was the Public Works officer at the Manana barracks installation.

- 34th Naval Construction Battalion
- 80th Naval Construction Battalion
- 15 USN Special Construction Battalions (stevedore) were segregated.
  - 15th Special Naval Construction Battalion
  - 17th Special Naval Construction Battalion
  - 20th Special Naval Construction Battalion
  - 21st Special Naval Construction Battalion
  - 22nd Special Naval Construction Battalion
  - 23rd Special Naval Construction Battalion
  - 30th Special Naval Construction Battalion

In February 1942, CNO Admiral Harold Rainsford Stark recommended African Americans for ratings in the construction trades. In April the Navy announced it would enlist African Americans in the Seabees. Even so, there were just two CBs that were "colored" units, the 34th and 80th. Both had white Southern officers and black enlisted. Both battalions experienced problems with that arrangement that led to the replacement of the officers. The men of the 34th went on a hunger strike which made national news. The Commander of the 80th had 19 enlisted dishonorably discharged for sedition. The NAACP and Thurgood Marshall got 14 of those reversed. In 1943 the Navy drew up a proposal to raise the number of colored CBs to 5 and require that all non-rated men in the next 24 CBs be colored. The proposal was approved, but not acted on.

The lack of stevedores in combat zones was a huge issue for the Navy. Authorization for the formation of cargo handling CBs or "Special CBs" happened mid-September 1942. By wars end 41 Special CBs had been commissioned, of which 15 were "colored". They were the first fully integrated units in the U.S. Navy. V-J Day brought the decommissioning of all of them. The Special CBs were forerunners of today's Navy Cargo Handling Battalions of the Navy Expeditionary Logistics Support Group (United States). The arrival of 15 colored Special CBs in Pearl Harbor made segregation an issue for the Navy. For some time the men slept in tents, but the disparity of treatment was obvious even to the Navy. The 14th Naval District felt they deserved proper shelter with at least separate but equal barracks. Manana Barracks and Waiawa Gulch became the United States' largest colored military installation with over 4,000 Seabee stevedores segregated there. It was the site of racial strife to the point that the camp was fenced in and placed under armed guard. The Seabees would be trucked back and forth to the docks in cattle trucks. Two naval supply depots were located at Waiawa Gulch.

Of note were the actions of the 17th Special Naval Construction Battalion and the 16th Marine Field Depot on Peleliu, September 15–18, 1944. On D-Day the 7th Marines were in a situation where there were not enough of them to man the lines and get the wounded to safety. Coming to their aid were the two companies of the 16th Marine Field Depot(segregated) and the 17th Special Seabee (segregated). That night the Japanese mounted a counter-attack at 0200 hours. The Field Depot Marines are recorded as again having humped ammunition, to the front lines on the stretchers they brought the wounded back on and picked up rifles to become infantrymen. By the time it was over nearly the entire 17th CB had volunteered alongside them. The Seabee record states that besides humping ammo and helping wounded they volunteered to man the line where the wounded had been, man 37mm artillery that had lost gun crews and volunteered for anything dangerous. The 17th remained with the 7th Marines until the right flank had been secured D-plus 3. According to the Military History Encyclopedia on the Web, were it not for the "Black Marine shore party personal" the counterattack on the 7th Marines would not have been repulsed.

- On Peleliu, the white shore party detachments from the 33rd and 73rd CBs received Presidential Unit Citations along with the primary shore party, 1st Marine Pioneers. The Commander of the 17th Special CB (segregated) received the same commendatory letter as the Company Commanders of the 7th Marine Ammo Co. (segregated) and the 11th Marine Depot Co.(segregated). Before the battle was even over, Major General Rupertus USMC wrote to each that: "The negro race can well be proud of the work performed [by the 11th Marine Depot Company/ 7th Marine Ammunition Company/ 17th CB]. The wholehearted co-operation and untiring efforts which demonstrated in every respect that they appreciated the privilege of wearing a marine uniform and serving with the marines in combat. Please convey to your command these sentiments and inform them that in the eyes of the entire division they have earned a "Well done"." The Department of the Navy made an official press release of a copy of the 17th CB's "Well Done" letter on November 28, 1944.

On Okinawa the 34th CB worked with the 36th CB constructing Awase Airfield once the rains allowed work to go forward. The 34th also built the Joint Communications Station at Awase. Today the Navy maintains a Low Frequency communications station for submarines on the site created by the 34th CB.

- African American Seabees

=== Medal of Honor recipients ===
On January 13, 1997, President Bill Clinton, in a White House ceremony, awarded the nation's highest military honor – the Medal of Honor – to seven African-American servicemen who had served in World War II.

The only living recipient was First Lieutenant Vernon Baker.

The posthumous recipients were:

- Major Charles L. Thomas
- First Lieutenant John R. Fox
- Staff Sergeant Ruben Rivers
- Staff Sergeant Edward A. Carter, Jr. Carter also has a Military Sealift Command vessel named after him.
- Private First Class Willy F. James, Jr.
- Private George Watson

=== Blue discharges ===
African-American troops faced discrimination in the form of the disproportionate issuance of blue discharges. The blue discharge (also called a "blue ticket") was a form of administrative discharge created in 1916 to replace two previous discharge classifications, the administrative discharge without honor and the "unclassified" discharge. It was neither honorable nor dishonorable. Of the 48,603 blue discharges issued by the Army between December 1, 1941, and June 30, 1945, 10,806 were issued to African Americans. This accounts for 22.2% of all blue discharges, when African Americans made up 6.5% of the Army in that time frame. Blue discharge recipients frequently faced difficulties obtaining employment and were routinely denied the benefits of the G. I. Bill by the Veterans Administration (VA). In October 1945, Black-interest newspaper The Pittsburgh Courier launched a crusade against the discharge and its abuses. Calling the discharge "a vicious instrument that should not be perpetrated against the American Soldier", the Courier rebuked the Army for "allowing prejudiced officers to use it as a means of punishing Negro soldiers who do not like specifically unbearable conditions". The Courier printed instructions on how to appeal a blue discharge and warned its readers not to quickly accept a blue ticket out of the service because of the negative effect it would likely have on their lives.

The House Committee on Military Affairs held hearings in response to the press crusade, issuing a report in 1946 that sharply criticized its use and the VA for discriminating against blue discharge holders. Congress discontinued the blue discharge in 1947, but the VA continued its practice of denying G. I. Bill benefits to blue-tickets.

== Discrimination faced by African American soldiers ==
African American soldiers were frequently subjected to discrimination during their service in the US military during World War II. An aspect of racism in the United States in general and an aspect of racism against African Americans in particular, this practice was prevalent abroad and it was also prevalent domestically, and it was particularly prevalent in the Southern United States.

According to detailed accounts which were given during World War 2, near St Louis, a white lieutenant ordered Black GI's who were seated in front of the black car to give their seats to fifteen Italian prisoners of war who were being transported by rail.

The press frequently excluded African American soldiers from advertisements, newsreels and war reports. Additionally, black soldiers were not given any awards for their contributions to the war effort. In February 1944, black leaders complained to the Bureau of Motion pictures, an official of the NAACP sent a letter and a petition was signed by 1053 people who protested against the exclusion of coloured American troops from films as well as from the OWI's media, stating, 'one tenth of men and women in our armed forces and in our culture are coloured Americans and by the laws of chance they should appear more often in your releases.

=== The FEPC and civil rights activism ===
African Americans and the role which they played during the US's war effort received more attention during the civil rights movement, due to discrimination charges and radicalised political attitudes as a result of the treatment which they received while they were in the service.

African Americans turned to the FEPC to profile discrimination charges during WWII, with a million African Americans holding defence jobs at this time. The NAACP helped claimants bring claims of peonage in the rural south, and violations of due process rights in employment in the north to the department of justice, and cases developed by the FEPC were pushed higher by unfair employment, highlighting the governments responsibility. This governmental issue combined with wartime racial discrimination helped to advance radicalism projecting the civil rights movement.

A coalition of black troops who opposed 'Hitlerism at home' boosted enrolment in the NAACP. The prolonged discrimination which was faced by African American soldiers included more than 240 violent racial incidents in forty seven cities around the country in 1943.

Judge William Hastie, the civilian aide for race relations in the war department, received thousands of letters which detailed the bad treatment of African American troops. In his letters, one soldier described camp Livingston in Louisiana by referring to it as a 'hell hole', he wrote the following, 'brother if you're coloured you don't stand a chance down here.' Another letter by an African American soldier stated, 'even German prisoners of war have more opportunities' than us.'

== Integration of the armed forces ==
On July 26, 1948, President Harry S. Truman signed Executive Order 9981, integrating the military and mandating equality of treatment and opportunity. It also made it illegal, per military law, to make a racist remark. Desegregation of the military was not complete for several years, and all-black Army units persisted well into the Korean War. The last all-black unit was not disbanded until 1954.

In 1950, Lieutenant Leon Gilbert of the still-segregated 24th Infantry Regiment was court martialled and sentenced to death for refusing to obey the orders of a white officer while serving in the Korean War. Gilbert maintained that the orders would have meant certain death for himself and the men in his command. The case led to worldwide protests and increased attention to segregation and racism in the U.S. military. Gilbert's sentence was commuted to twenty and later seventeen years of imprisonment; he served five years and was released.

The integration commanded by Truman's 1948 Executive Order extended to schools and neighborhoods as well as military units. Fifteen years after the Executive Order, Secretary of Defense Robert McNamara issued Department of Defense Directive 5120.36. "Every military commander", the Directive mandates, "has the responsibility to oppose discriminatory practices affecting his men and their dependents and to foster equal opportunity for them, not only in areas under his immediate control, but also in nearby communities where they may gather in off-duty hours." While the directive was issued in 1963, it was not until 1967 that the first non-military establishment was declared off-limits. In 1970 the requirement that commanding officers first obtain permission from the Secretary of Defense was lifted, and areas were allowed to be declared housing areas off limits to military personnel by their commanding officer.

Since the end of military segregation and the creation of an all-volunteer army, the American military saw the representation of African Americans in its ranks rise dramatically.

== Korean War ==
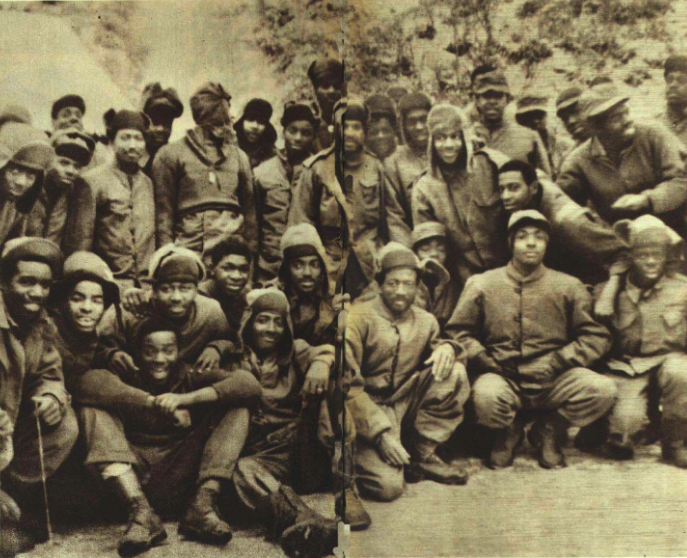
African-American prisoners of war in Korea in 1950

Jesse L. Brown became the U.S. Navy's first black aviator in October 1948. He died when his plane was shot down during the Battle of Chosin Reservoir in North Korea. He was unable to parachute from his crippled F4U Corsair and crash-landed successfully. His injuries and damage to his aircraft prevented him from leaving the plane. A white squadron mate, Thomas Hudner, crash-landed his F4U Corsair near Brown and attempted to extricate Brown but could not and Brown died of his injuries. Hudner was awarded the Medal of Honor for his efforts. The U.S. Navy honored Jesse Brown by naming a frigate after him – the USS Jesse L. Brown (FF-1089).

James H. Harvey (born July 13, 1923) became the U.S. Air Force's first African-American jet fighter pilot to engage in combat during the Korean War.

Two enlisted men from the 24th Infantry Regiment (still a segregated unit), Cornelius H. Charlton and William Thompson, posthumously received the Medal of Honor for actions during the war.

U.S. President Harry Truman issued the order to desegregate the armed forces on July 26, 1948. Truman believed that passing this order would help end racial discrimination. In 1950, North Korea invaded South Korea and the United States entered to war. African American troops composed part of the task force.

On November 24, 1950, 300,000 Chinese troops stormed across the Yalu River, and the majority black 503rd Battalion found themselves directly in the line of fire. The ill-equipped unit lost the battle and many soldiers were killed or taken prisoner by the Chinese. The conditions in these prisons were cold with not enough food. The African American soldiers spent up to three years in the prisons. The Chinese captors believed that African Americans were particularly vulnerable to anti-American propaganda because of the discrimination they faced back home and in their units. As a result, the Chinese subjected African Americans to anti-capitalist and anti-imperial brainwashing more than their white counterparts.

About 600,000 African Americans served in the armed forces during the war and 5,000 died in combat. Many were awarded the Distinguished Service Cross, Silver Star, and Bronze Star.

== Vietnam War ==
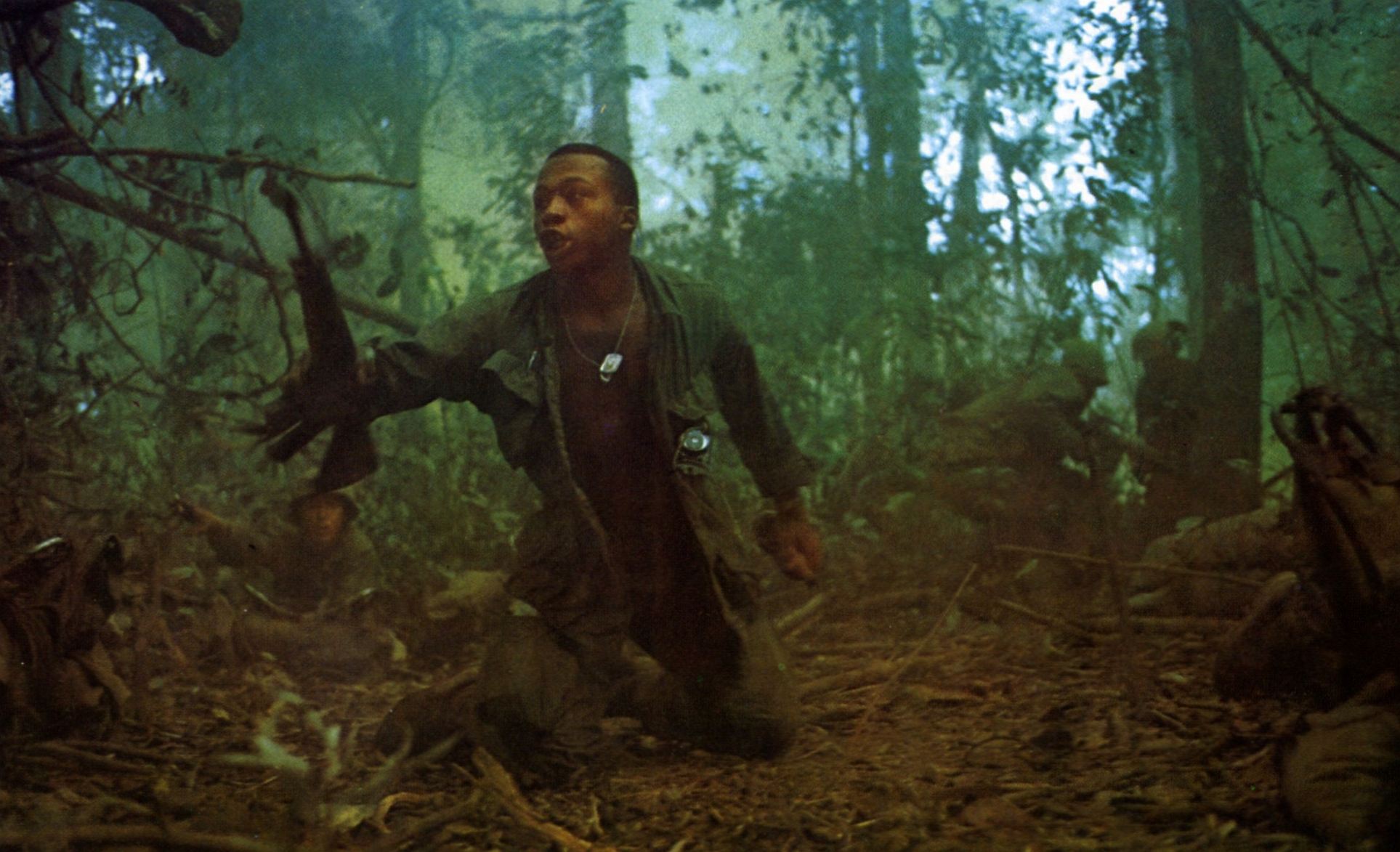
A U.S. soldier of 1st Battalion, 503rd U.S. Infantry battles for Hill 882, southwest of Dak To, November 1967

Troop D, 1st Squadron, 10th Cavalryman in elephant grass, 20 October 1970

The Vietnam War saw many great accomplishments by many African Americans, including twenty who received the Medal of Honor for their actions. African Americans were over-represented in hazardous duty and combat roles during the conflict, and suffered disproportionately higher casualty rates. Civil-rights leaders protested this disparity during the early years of the war, prompting reforms that were implemented in 1967–68 resulting in the casualty rate dropping to slightly higher than their percentage of the total population.

In 1967, President Lyndon B. Johnson presented the Medal of Honor to U.S. Army Specialist Five Lawrence Joel, for a "very special kind of courage – the unarmed heroism of compassion and service to others." Joel was the first living African American to receive the Medal of Honor since the Mexican–American War. He was a medic who in 1965 saved the lives of U.S. troops under ambush in Vietnam and defied direct orders to stay to the ground, walking through Viet Cong gunfire and tending to the troops despite being shot twice himself. The Lawrence Joel Veterans Memorial Coliseum in Winston-Salem, North Carolina, is dedicated to his honor.

On August 21, 1968, with the posthumous award of the Medal of Honor, U.S. Marine James Anderson, Jr. became the first African-American U.S. Marine recipient of the Medal of Honor for his heroic actions and sacrifice of life.

On December 10, 1968, U.S. Army Captain Riley Leroy Pitts became the first African-American commissioned officer to be awarded the Medal of Honor. His medal was presented posthumously to his wife, Eula Pitts, by President Lyndon B. Johnson.

Four out of the 23 African-American Medal of Honor recipients were Army Special Forces, also known as Green Berets, who served in Vietnam. Sergeant First Class Melvin Morris, SFC. Eugene Ashley, Jr., and SFC. William Maud Bryant were members of the 5th Special Forces Group. Paris Davis, COL, was a member of the 10th Special Forces Group.

Melvin Morris received the Medal of Honor 44 years after the action in which he earned the Distinguished Service Cross. Sergeant Ashley's medal was posthumously awarded to his family at the White House by Vice President Spiro T. Agnew on December 2, 1969.

== From the post-Vietnam War era to the present day ==
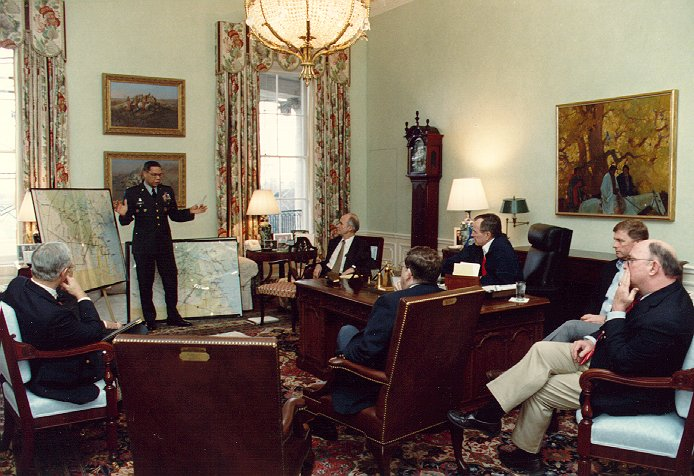
General Colin Powell briefs President George H. W. Bush and his advisors on the progress of the Gulf War

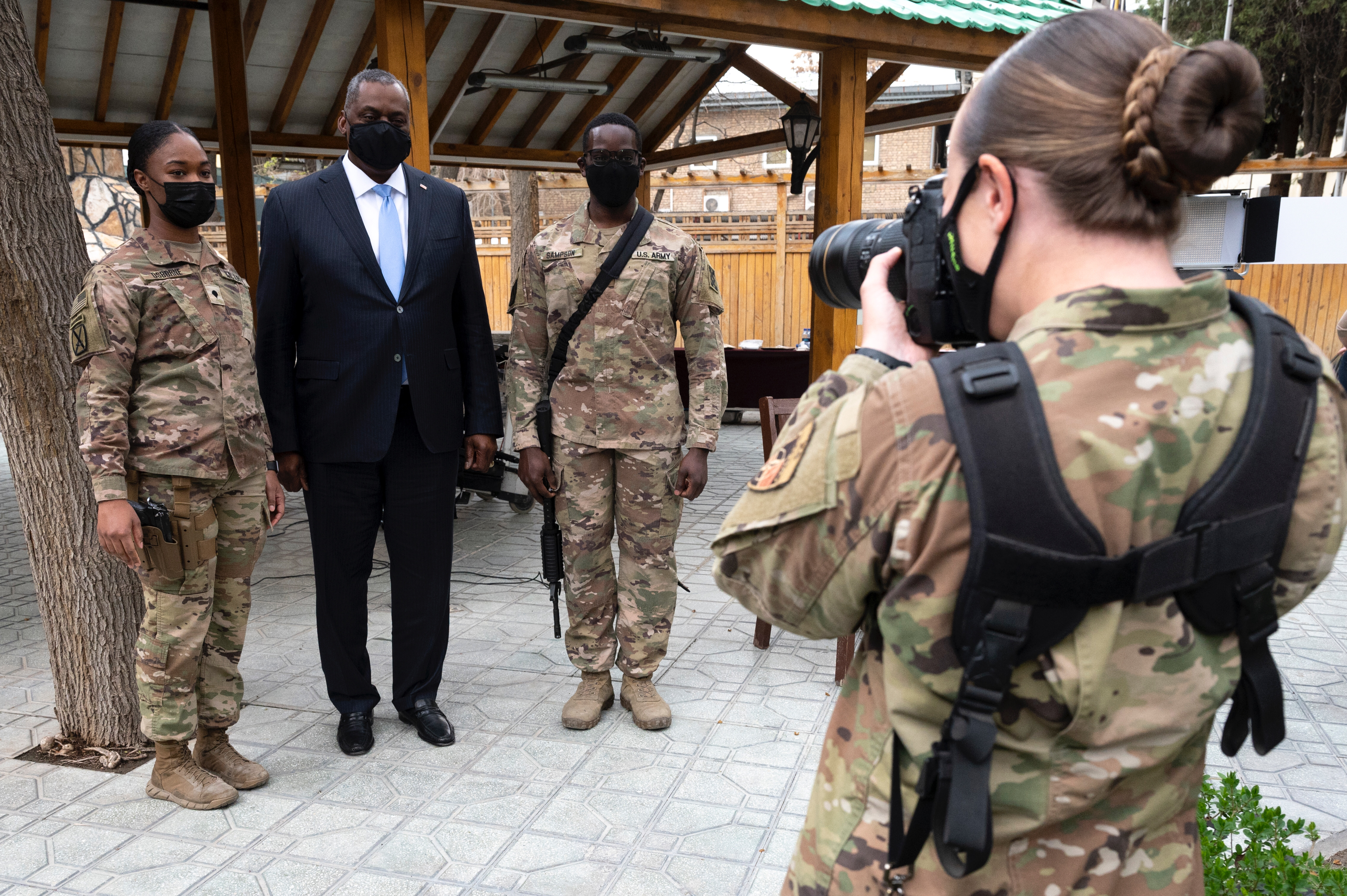
Secretary of Defense Lloyd Austin poses for a photo alongside U.S. Army soldiers in Afghanistan.

In 1976, the first class of female cadets entered the military academies including Priscilla Walker Locke who would be the first African American graduate of the USMA.

In 1989, President George H. W. Bush appointed Army General Colin Powell to the position of Chairman of the Joint Chiefs of Staff, making Powell the highest-ranking officer in the United States military. Powell was the first, and is so far the only, African American to hold that position. The chairman serves as the chief military adviser to the President and the Secretary of Defense. During his tenure Powell oversaw the 1989 United States invasion of Panama to oust General Manuel Noriega and the 1990 to 1991 Gulf War against Iraq. General Powell's four-year term as Chairman ended in 1993.

General William E. "Kip" Ward was officially nominated as the first commander of the new United States Africa Command on July 10, 2007. He assumed command on October 1, 2007.

Ronald L. Green, former sergeant major of the Marine Corps, is African-American.

On January 20, 2009, Barack Obama was inaugurated as President of the United States, making him ex officio the first African-American commander-in-chief of the United States Armed Forces.

On August 6, 2020, Charles Q. Brown Jr. became the first African-American chief of a United States military service branch, when he took over as Chief of Staff of the Air Force.

On January 22, 2021, Lloyd Austin became the first African-American Secretary of Defense.

== African American Veterans Monument ==
The African American Veterans Memorial in Buffalo and Erie County Naval & Military Park in downtown Buffalo, New York, was dedicated on September 24, 2022, after six years of planning. It honors the service of African Americans in all U.S. military conflicts. It is the first monument of its kind in the United States. Names of African American veterans are inscribed on dog-tag-like paver stones on the plaza in front of the monolith representing each significant U.S. military conflict, from the American Revolutionary War to the global war on terror. The on-site interactive experience includes interpretive videos, which visitors with mobile devices can access through QR codes.

== Military history of African Americans in popular culture ==
Tuskegee Airmen were featured in Wings for This Man (1945).

The following is a list of notable African-American military members or units in popular culture.

Release date (or year)	Name (or event)	Notability	Reference
1944	The Negro Soldier	a Frank Capra recruitment documentary	
1945	Wings for This Man	a propaganda short about the Tuskegee Airmen was produced by the First Motion Picture Unit of the Army Air Forces. The film was narrated by Ronald Reagan.	
1949	Home of the Brave	This film combines three of the top film genres of 1949: the war film, the psychological drama and the problems suffered by African-Americans. The film is based on a 1946 play by Arthur Laurents where it originally featured the protagonist as Jewish rather than black.	
1951	The Steel Helmet	an early Samuel Fuller film about black and white soldiers fighting side by side in Korea, with racial tensions tightened by a redneck sergeant and a North Korean agitator	
1959	Pork Chop Hill	a film directed by Lewis Milestone, starring Gregory Peck and Woody Strode. It depicts the first Battle of Pork Chop Hill towards the end the Korean War.	
1960	All the Young Men	a Korean War feature film directed by Hall Bartlett and starring Alan Ladd and Sidney Poitier dealing with desegregation in the United States Marine Corps.	
1960	Sergeant Rutledge	a John Ford western film about a fictional court-martial of a 1st Sgt. in the 9th U.S. Cavalry who is acquitted when the real criminal is discovered.	
1965–1971	Hogan's Heroes	In this sitcom, set in a German prisoner-of-war (POW) camp during World War 2, Ivan Dixon played the role of Staff Sergeant James Kinchloe (seasons 1–5), the electronics/communications expert. Casting an African-American actor as a positively-shown supporting character was a major step forward for a television show in the mid-1960s. Dixon left the show prior to the final season and was replaced by another African-American actor, Kenneth Washington as Sgt. Richard Baker.	
1966–1969	Star Trek (the original series)	Actress Nichelle Nichols played the role of Lieutenant Nyota Uhura. Her portrayal in the series, in the role of an African female officer was groundbreaking for African American actresses on American television.	
1972	DC Comics	John Stewart of the Green Lanterns was created as an African-American Marine	
1984	A Soldier's Story	a 1984 drama film directed by Norman Jewison, based upon Charles Fuller's Pulitzer Prize-winning Off Broadway production A Soldier's Play. A black officer is sent to investigate the murder of a black sergeant in Louisiana near the end of World War II.	
1989	Glory	film featuring the 54th Union regiment composed of African-American soldiers. Starring Denzel Washington and Matthew Broderick	
1990	The Court-Martial of Jackie Robinson	A film about the early life of the baseball star in the army, particularly his court-martial for insubordination regarding segregation.	
January 31, 1992	Family Matters; ABC TV series	In the episode entitled "Brown Bombshell", Estelle (portrayed by actress Rosetta LeNoire) is determined to share the stories of her late fighter-pilot husband and World War II's Tuskegee Airmen to an uninterested Winslow clan. Eventually, she is invited to share her stories to Eddie's American history class.	
1992	The Liberators: Fighting on Two Fronts in World War II	Documentary film co-produced by Bill Miles and Nina Rosenblum and narrated by actors Louis Gossett Jr. and Denzel Washington. It tells the story of the primarily black 761st Tank Battalion (United States) and 183rd Combat Engineers during World War II.	
1993	Posse	The first part of the film shows Buffalo Soldiers from the US Army's 10th Cavalry Regiment during the Spanish–American War in Cuba.	
1994	Assault at West Point: The Court-Martial of Johnson Whittaker	Shown as a flashback (narrative), the film retraces when, in 1880, Johnson Chesnut Whittaker, one of the first African-American cadets at West Point, is assaulted by three white cadets. The academy instead court-martials Whittaker in the belief that he staged his own attack, supposedly to avoid a philosophy exam.	
1996	The Tuskegee Airmen	Produced and aired by HBO and starring Laurence Fishburne.	
1997	G.I. Joe action figure series	The Tuskegee Airmen are represented.	
1997	Buffalo Soldiers (1997 film)	Set in 1880, the film tells the true story of the black cavalry corps known as the Buffalo Soldiers, who patrolled and protected the Western territories after the end of the American Civil War.	
1999	Mutiny	TV made film of the 1944 Port Chicago disaster	
2001	The Wild Blue: The Men and Boys who Flew the B-24s over Germany	Book by Stephen Ambrose in which the Tuskegee Airmen are mentioned and honored.	
2001–2005	JAG	The Commander Peter Ulysses Sturgis Turner (played by Scott Lawrence) is an African-American Navy Officer in the JAG TV series. Former submarine officer, he serves now as lawyer in JAG	
2002	JAG: "Port Chicago"	The television drama features the incident	
2002	Antwone Fisher	Biographical drama film about an African-American United States Navy sailor	
2002	Hart's War	a film about a World War II prisoner of war (POW) based on the novel by John Katzenbach	
2004	Silver Wings and Civil Rights: The Fight to Fly	this documentary was the first film to feature information regarding the "Freeman Field Mutiny", the struggle of 101 African-American officers arrested for entering a white officers' club.	
2005	Willy's Cut & Shine	a play by Michael Bradford depicting African-American World War II soldiers and the troubles they encounter upon returning home to the Deep South.	
2006	Flyboys (film)	Film set during World War 1 about the Lafayette Escadrille (the 124th air squadron formed by the French in 1916). It was mostly composed of volunteer American pilots before the United States entered the war. One of the pilots is Eugene Skinner (played by Abdul Salis). This character is based on Eugene Bullard, one of the first African-American military pilots.	
2007	A Distant Shore: African Americans of D-Day	A television documentary that was produced for The History Channel by Flight 33 Productions. It tells the story of African American soldiers who went ashore in France during the 1944 Invasion of Normandy (D-Day).	
2008	Miracle at St. Anna	Italian epic war film set primarily in Italy during German-occupied Europe in World War II. Directed by Spike Lee, the film is based on the eponymous 2003 novel by James McBride, who also wrote the screenplay.	
2009	Fly	a play about the Tuskegee Airmen	
2010	For Love of Liberty	a PBS documentary television series that portrays African-American servicemen and women and their dedicated allegiance to the United States military.	
2011	The Wereth Eleven	This film retraces the steps of eleven African-American G.I.s from the 333rd Field Artillery Battalion (United States) after their unit was overrun at the start of the Battle of the Bulge.	
2012	Red Tails	George Lucas announced he was planning a film about the Tuskegee Airmen. In his release Lucas says, "They were the only escort fighters during the war that never lost a bomber so they were, like, the best."	
2020	The 24th	Historical war drama film surrounding the events prior, during and after the Houston riot of 1917.	
2022	The Railway Children Return	Towards the end of the film, an African-American U.S. Army general discharges from military service an African-American soldier on being informed that the said soldier is only 14 years old and had lied about his age when he enlisted.	
2022	Devotion	In this film, based on a true story, actor Jonathan Majors plays the role of Jesse Brown, the first African-American aviator to complete the U.S. Navy's flight naval program and later saw combat while fighting in the Korean War.	
2022	Amsterdam	In this film, there is a scene were African American soldiers are made to wear French Army uniforms prior to the Meuse-Argonne offensive (26/09/1918 – 11/11/1918).	

== See also ==
- African-American mutinies in the United States Armed Forces
- Military history of the United States
- United States Colored Troops
- List of African American Medal of Honor recipients
- Frederick C. Branch
- Benjamin O. Davis
- Martin Delany
- Daniel "Chappie" James, Jr.
- National Association for Black Veterans
- List of African-American astronauts
- African-American discrimination in the U.S. Military
- Racial segregation in the United States Armed Forces
