= 679 =

679 or 679th may refer to:

== In general ==
- 679 (number), the number
- AD 679, a year in the Common Era
- 679 BC, a year Before the Common Era

== Places ==
- +679, the country dialing code for Fiji
- 679 area code, a telephone area code in Michigan, USA
- 679 Pax (Asteroid #679), a main belt asteroid, the 679th asteroid registered.
- Highway 679, see list of highways numbered 679

== Groups, companies, organizations ==
- 679 Artists, a former record label
- No. 679 Squadron RAF, a WW2 unit of the British Royal Air Force
- No. 679 (The Duke of Connaught's) Squadron AAC, a 21st-century British army helicopter unit
- 679th Tank Destroyer Battalion, a WW2 unit of the U.S. Army
- 679th Bombardment Squadron, a WW2 unit of the U.S. Army Air Force
- 679th Radar Squadron, a Cold War unit of the U.S. Air Force

== Transportation and vehicular ==
- Type 679 training ship, a Chinese training ship class
- Avro 679 Manchester, a British WW2 heavy bomber
- Thai Airways Flight 679 (8 September 2013), a runway excursion on landing
- London Buses route 679, London, England, UK; a bus route

== Other uses ==
- 679 (song), a 2015 song by Fetty Wap
- Mohamed Tahar (1980–2017; internment number: 679), a Yemenese Guantanamo detainee

== See also ==
- 6/79
  - June 1979
  - June 1879
  - June 79 AD
- 67/9
  - September 1967
  - September 1867
  - September 67 AD
