= Alfred Brothers =

American politician (1919–2002)

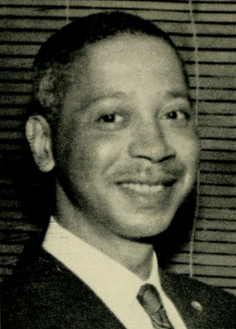

Member of the Massachusetts House of Representatives from the 11th Suffolk district
- In office 1961–1965
- Preceded by: Oswald Jordan / George Green
- Succeeded by: Franklin W. Holgate / Michael E. Haynes

Personal details
- Born: Alfred Sylvester Brothers; November 4, 1919 Somerville, Massachusetts, United States
- Died: September 6, 2002 (aged 82) Brockton, Massachusetts, United States
- Party: Republican
- Children: 2
- Education: Boston University

Alfred Sylvester Brothers (November 4, 1919 – September 6, 2002) was an American politician who served two terms in the Massachusetts House of Representatives.

== Early life ==
Brothers was born on November 4, 1919, in Somerville, Massachusetts. He graduated from Boston's Mechanic Arts High School and Boston University. During World War II he served in the all-black 366th Infantry Regiment and was awarded the Bronze Star Medal. While in the Army, Brothers became close friends with Edward Brooke. Brothers suggested Brooke move to Massachusetts and later talked him into entering politics. Brooke represented Massachusetts in the United States Senate from 1967 to 1979 and was the first popularly elected African-American senator. After the war, Brothers entered in the construction and real estate business and he and Brooke had their offices in the same building (an old theater they rented from Necco).

== Government ==
Brothers represented Roxbury in the Massachusetts House of Representatives from 1961 to 1965. He represented the 11th Suffolk district, which covered Boston's Ward 12. In 1964 the district lines were redrawn and Brothers lost his bid for reelection in the 7th Suffolk district.

Brother was a close campaign advisor to Brooke and held several positions within General Services Administration's Boston office, retiring in 1986 as the director of the civil rights and contract compliance division.

== Death ==
Brothers died on September 6, 2002, at Good Samaritan Medical Center in Brockton, Massachusetts. He was survived by his wife and two children.
