= Oswald Jordan =

American politician

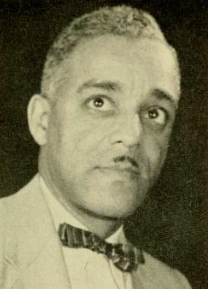
- Jordan in 1959

Member of the Massachusetts House of Representatives from the 11th Suffolk district
- In office 1959–1961
- Preceded by: Leo Sontag
- Succeeded by: Royal L. Bolling / Alfred Brothers

Personal details
- Born: Oswald Louis Jordan; May 9, 1912 Boston, Massachusetts, United States
- Died: November 7, 1991 (aged 79) Hyannis Port, Massachusetts, United States
- Party: Democratic
- Children: 3
- Education: Howard University; Boston University School of Law

Oswald Louis Jordan (May 9, 1912 – November 7, 1991) was an American politician who represented the 11th Suffolk district in the Massachusetts House of Representatives. He was the first African-American to represent Roxbury in the House.

== Early life ==
Jordan was born on May 9, 1912, in Boston. He graduated from Boston Latin School and earned a bachelor's degree and a master's degree in political science at Howard University. During the 1930s he led the Massachusetts chapter of the Brotherhood of Sleeping Car Porters. During World War II he served as warrant officer in the all-black 366th Infantry Regiment. After the war he earned a law degree from the Boston University School of Law.

== Government service ==
In 1946, Jordan joined the staff of the state's Fair Employment Practices Commission, which became the Massachusetts Commission Against Discrimination. He served one term in the Massachusetts House of Representatives (1959–60). During the Presidency of Jimmy Carter, Jordan served as the area director of the Office of Federal Contract Compliance Programs' Boston office.

== Death ==
Jordan died on November 7, 1991, at his home in Hyannis Port, Massachusetts. He was survived by his three children.
