= Howard Queen =

American army officer (1893–1978)

Howard Donovan Queen
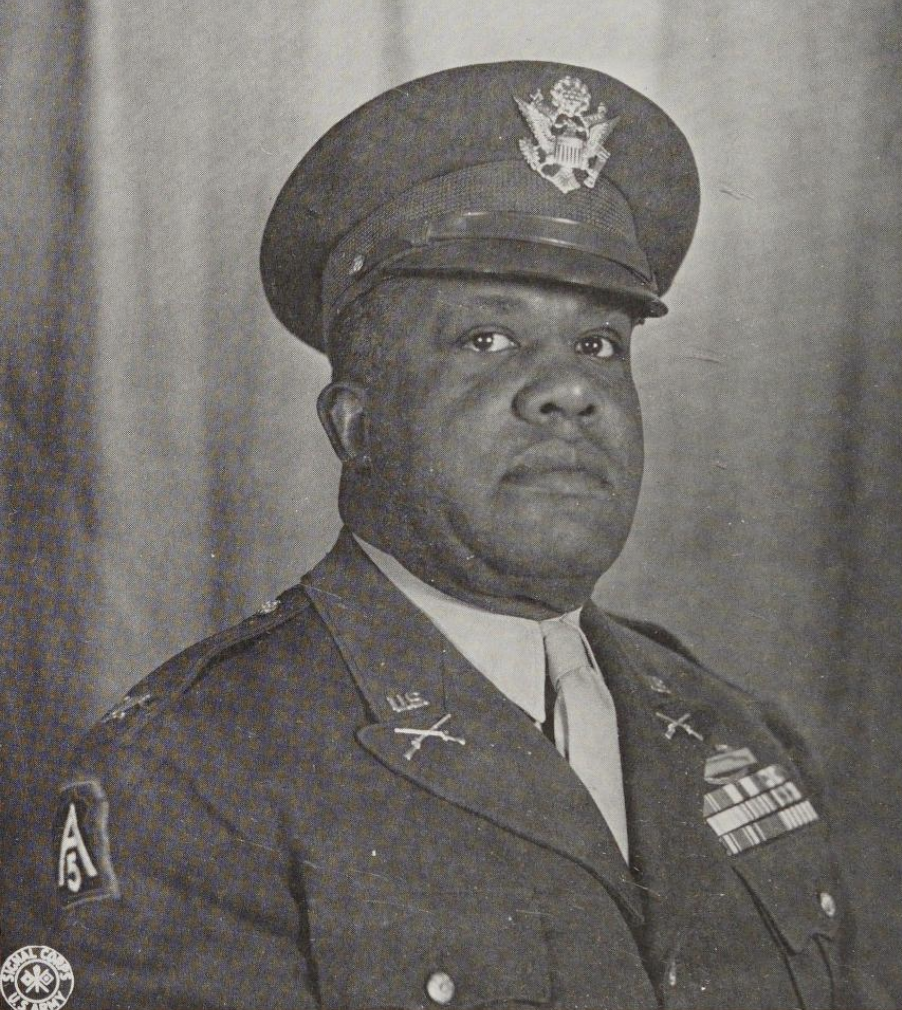
- Queen in 1944
- Born: November 18, 1893; Maryland, U.S.
- Died: March 6, 1978 (aged 84) Coatesville, Pennsylvania, U.S.
- Allegiance: United States
- Branch: U.S. Army
- Service years: 1914–1945
- Rank: Colonel
- Commands: 366th Infantry Regiment
- Conflicts: Italian campaign
- Education: Howard University

Howard Donovan Queen (November 18, 1893 – March 6, 1978) was a United States Army colonel and commanding officer of the 366th Infantry Regiment, an all-Black unit attached to the 92nd Infantry Division, during World War II. Queen commanded the regiment in combat during the Italian campaign and previously fought in the Pancho Villa expedition and on the Western Front in World War I.

== Early life and military service ==
Queen was born in Maryland in 1893. His father, Richard Queen, was a sergeant in the 10th Cavalry Regiment and a 15-year veteran of the Indian Wars. As a teenager, Queen enlisted in the regiment on April 13, 1911. He saw combat in northern Mexico during the Pancho Villa expedition and survived the Battle of Carrizal in 1916. During World War I, he was a captain with the 368th Infantry Regiment, 92nd Division, made up of Black soldiers and junior officers commanded by white senior officers. Racially segregated and initially tasked with unskilled labor by the U.S. Army, his regiment was seconded to the French Army and subsequently distinguished itself in combat in the Lorraine and Meuse-Argonne campaigns.

In 1925, he received a degree in electrical engineering from Howard University.

== Military service during World War II ==
In 1943 during World War II, Queen assumed command of the newly formed all-Black 366th Infantry Regiment. In May 1944, Colonel Queen and his regiment deployed to the Italian theater, where they were given noncombat guard duties at air bases until November 26, when they transferred to the 92nd Division, whose Black troops reported to white officers under Major General Edward Almond, at Livorno. The regiment was soon broken up, with companies deployed to frontline positions to relieve combat-weary 92nd Division and white units.

According to the men and officers of the 366th, General Almond expressed displeasure at the 366th's deployment. First Lieutenant John T. Letts quoted Almond's remarks: "Your Negro newspapers have seen fit to cause you to be brought over here; now I'm going to see that you suffer your share of the casualties." First Lieutenant Robert Brown recalled that Almond told the assembled regiment to their faces that "he did not ask for us and he did not need us and that the only reason we were there was because of the Negro newspapers, and since we were there, he was going to make us fight." Letts speculated that General Almond and his staff resented the presence of high-ranking Black officers in the 366th Regiment. When Queen protested about his men's inadequate training and weapons, Almond retorted that the 366th would have to fight, whether "equipped or not equipped." Almond also told the 92nd Division's assembled Black officers that he did not believe any Black soldier should be promoted beyond the rank of captain.

On December 15, Queen filed a written request to be relieved from command, declaring, "The treatment the regiment and myself have received during the period attached to the 92nd Infantry Division has been such as to disturb me mentally and has not been such as is usually given an officer of my grade and service." Colonel Queen was relieved on the grounds of physical disability and replaced by his first officer, Lieutenant Colonel Alonzo Ferguson. Queen retired after more than 30 years of military service.

In his foreword to a 1987 book about the experience of Black soldiers during the Second World War, Queen wrote, "The malignancy of racism reached such outrageous proportions during our war against fascism it bordered on insanity."

== Personal life ==
After retiring from the army, Queen chaired the mathematics department at the Downingtown Industrial School from 1953 to 1964. He chaired the Parkesburg Planning Commission from 1967 to 1970 and was a deacon of the Upper Octorara Presbyterian Church.

Queen was married to Clara S. Queen, who died in Parkesburg on August 6, 1952, and is buried alongside him at Arlington National Cemetery. He later remarried to Helen Hall Queen. In failing health, he entered the Coatesville Veterans Administration Hospital in 1974 and died there in 1978 at the age of 84. His burial was at Arlington National Cemetery.
