= Riboscioli (Barga) =

- Abandoned village
- Riboscioli

Population
  - Total: 0

Riboscioli is a small abandoned hamlet located within the municipality of Barga, in the Province of Lucca, Tuscany, Italy. The name refers to one of the many rural and mountainous settlements once inhabited in the Val di Corsonna, an Apennine area between the villages of Sommocolonia and Renaio.

== History and features ==
Riboscioli is classified as one of the “abandoned hamlets” that can be found throughout the mountainous regions of the middle Serchio Valley. It appears in historical land registry maps and in the municipal urban planning documents among the depopulated rural areas.

The hamlet was gradually abandoned during the 20th century due to the decline of subsistence farming and its geographical isolation. The area is prone to hydrogeological instability and is currently overgrown and inaccessible by road.

== Tourism and heritage initiatives ==
In recent years, the Municipality of Barga has included Riboscioli in its broader cultural and environmental revitalisation plans. These efforts aim to recover and promote the memory of the area's rural past. Other sites involved include Bacchionero, historical mills, and chestnut groves once vital to the local economy.

== Folklore ==
The surrounding area is rich in local legends and oral traditions. Notably, nearby Val di Corsonna is associated with the ghostly tale of “The Headless Man”, a folkloric figure said to haunt the woods and paths.

== Accessibility ==
Riboscioli is only accessible on foot via unmarked woodland paths. Visitors are advised to consult local topographic maps or be accompanied by an experienced guide.

== See also ==
- Apennine Mountains
