= Aaron R. Fisher =

United States Army officer

Aaron Richard Fisher
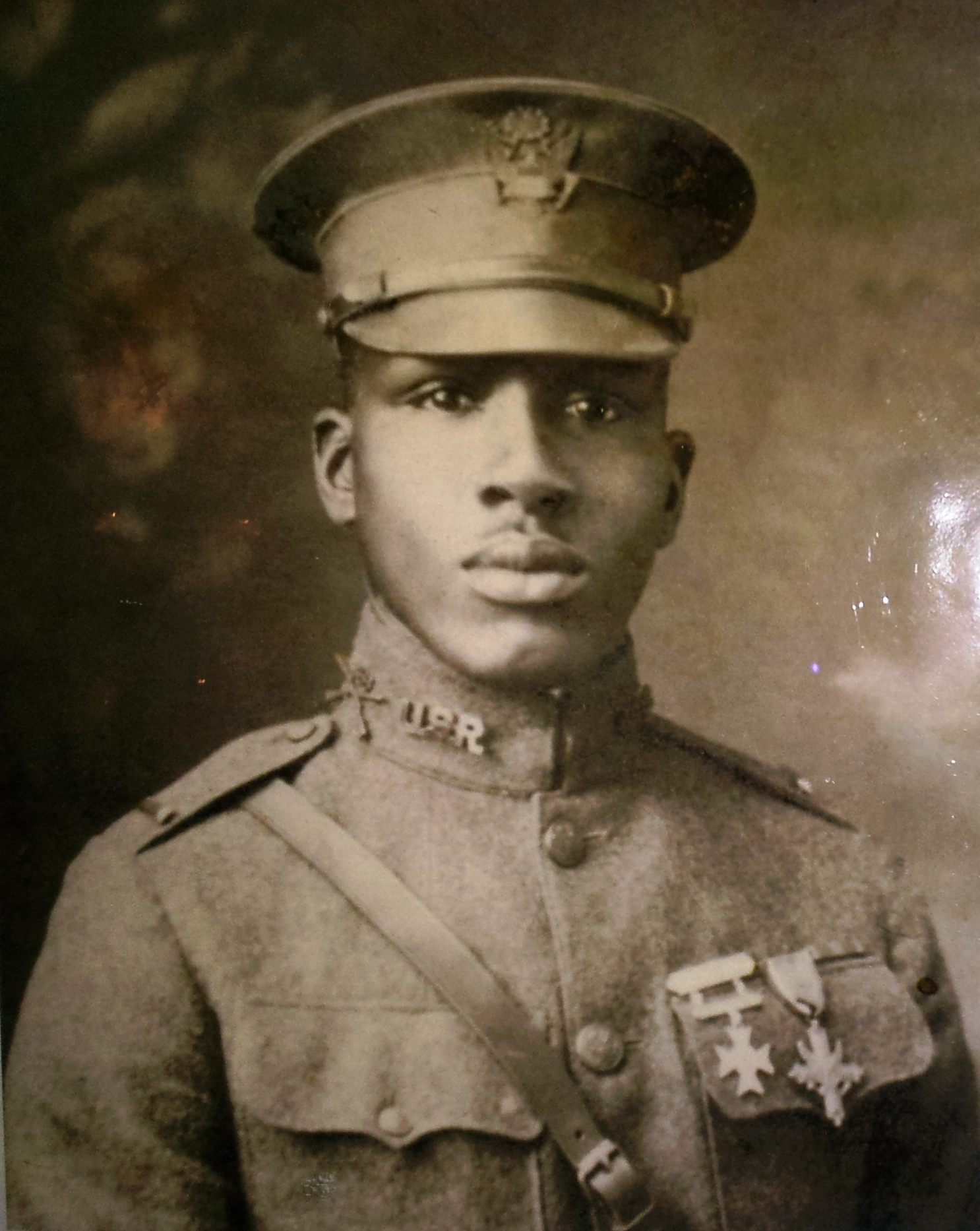
- Born: May 14, 1895; Lyles, Indiana, United States
- Died: November 22, 1985 (aged 90); Xenia, Ohio, United States
- Military career
- Allegiance: United States
- Branch: United States Army
- Service years: 1911–1947
- Rank: Captain (1919); Chief Warrant Officer (1947)
- Unit: 366th Infantry Regiment
- Conflicts: World War I World War II
- Awards: Distinguished Service Cross; Croix de Guerre; Purple Heart; Mexican Service Medal; World War I Victory Medal; Army Commendation Medal

Aaron Richard Fisher (May 14, 1895 – November 22, 1985) was an American soldier. He served more than thirty years in the U.S. Army (1911–1947) and was a recipient of several military awards, most notably the Distinguished Service Cross and Purple Heart from the United States and the Croix de Guerre with gold star from the French government for actions in battle, while serving as a second lieutenant during World War I.

In addition Fisher was awarded a U.S. Army Commendation Medal for eleven and a half years of service with the Reserve Officers' Training Corps unit at Wilberforce University. Fisher was promoted to chief warrant officer in 1942 and retired from the military in 1947. He spent his final years in Xenia, Ohio, where he was a civilian employee at Wright-Patterson Air Force Base. He died on November 22, 1985. His remains are buried at Valley View Memorial Gardens near Xenia.

Fisher, who enlisted in the U.S. Army in 1911, initially served with the 9th Cavalry Regiment and the 24th Infantry Regiment, both of which were African-American regiments. The Army was segregated. He was commissioned as a second lieutenant and deployed to Europe, where he served in the 366th Infantry Regiment, 92nd Infantry Division, in France. After World War I Fisher rose through the ranks of enlisted men. He served in the 24th Infantry Regiment, was promoted to the grade of warrant officer in 1921, and was appointed as a second lieutenant in the U.S. Army Reserve. Fisher's military career included duty in Texas, Arizona, New Mexico, California, Hawaii, Mexico, and the Philippines, before his appointment to the ROTC's military tactics unit at Wilberforce University in Ohio in 1936. Called "Cap" or Captain Fisher by the Wilberforce ROTC cadets, he retired from military duty in 1947.

== Early life and education ==
Aaron Richard Fisher was born on May 14, 1895, at Lyles Station, an African-American community in Gibson County, Indiana. He was the son of Macy Octiva (Barnhill) and Benjamin F. Fisher. Aaron's father, a farmer, had served in the infantry with the U.S. Colored Troops during the American Civil War. His mother died when he was ten years old; his father's second wife was Susan Lyles Lawrence.

Fisher attended the public grade school at Lyles Station and spent two years at Lincoln High School, an all-black high school in Princeton, Indiana. After leaving high school he worked on his father's farm at Lyles Station until joining the U.S. Army in 1911.

== Career ==
=== Early military service ===
Fisher enlisted in the U.S. Army on February 28, 1911, at Jefferson Barracks near Saint Louis, Missouri, and was sent to Camp Sherman, Ohio, and Leon Springs, Texas, for military training. Initially assigned to the 9th Cavalry Regiment, one of four African-American regiments in the U.S. Army at the time, Fisher was transferred to the 24th Infantry Regiment, another African-American regiment. He was promoted to the rank of corporal on September 13, 1914. By 1916 Fisher was performing guard duty in New Mexico and across the border in Mexico. Fisher was promoted to sergeant on December 31, 1916. In early 1917, when the United States entered World War I, Fisher was serving with the 24th Infantry at Douglas, Arizona, and at Camp Furlong, New Mexico.

Fisher continued his military service in the 366th Infantry Regiment, one of the four infantry regiments that comprised the 92nd Infantry Division, one of the two black infantry divisions formed at the end of 1917. Fisher completed a 90-day Officer Candidate School at Fort Des Moines Provisional Army Officer Training School in Des Moines, Iowa, in May 1918 and was deployed to Europe on June 15, 1918.

=== World War I military service ===
Fisher received a commission as a second lieutenant, effective June 1, 1918, and served in the 366th Infantry Regiment, 92nd Infantry Division. Fisher was awarded the Distinguished Service Cross, the country's second highest honor awarded for valor, for his "extraordinary heroism in action" in a battle that took place on September 3, 1918, when the 92nd Division was stationed in the Saint Die sector in France. Fisher's citation reads:

The President of the United States of America, authorized by Act of Congress, July 9, 1918, takes pleasure in presenting the Distinguished Service Cross to Second Lieutenant (Infantry) Aaron R. Fisher, United States Army, for extraordinary heroism in action while serving with 366th Infantry Regiment, 92d Division, A.E.F., near Lesseux, France, 3 September 1918. Lieutenant Fisher showed exceptional bravery in action when his position was raided by a superior force of the enemy by directing his men and refusing to leave his position, although he was severely wounded. He and his men continued to fight the enemy until the latter were beaten off by counterattack.

Because Fisher's effort was made in support of America's French allies, the government of France bestowed upon him its Croix de Guerre with gold star on May 17, 1910, acknowledging him as "an officer of admirable courage." Fisher, who was wounded in action, was later awarded the Purple Heart.

=== Postwar military service ===
After the war Fisher decided to remain in the U.S. Army, although it would require giving up his officer's commission. He was discharged as a commissioned officer on March 17, 1919, but reenlisted as a first sergeant in the 24th Infantry Regiment and served along the U.S-Mexican border. Black Officers who elected to stay in the service generally were reverted to warrant officer rank and Fisher was promoted to the grade of warrant officer on August 20, 1921. In addition, he was appointed as a second lieutenant in the U.S. Army Reserve and served as a reserve officer until 1947. Fisher was assigned to the Eighth Corps Headquarters at Fort Bliss, Texas, attended Quartermaster School at Philadelphia from September 1923 to June 1924, and continued his service in Arizona and New Mexico. He also served three years at Schofield Barracks (1927 to 1930) in Hawaii and completed a two-year tour of duty in the Philippines, before returning to the United States in 1934 for a year of service in San Francisco, California, with the Headquarters, Second Corps Area.

On June 29, 1936, Fisher was appointed to the Reserve Officers' Training Corps (ROTC) military tactics unit at Wilberforce University in Wilberforce, Ohio, where he remained as an instructor for eleven and a half years. His students included World War II Medal of Honor recipient John R. Fox. Fisher was promoted to chief warrant officer on June 16, 1942, but the Wilberforce cadets addressed him as "Cap" for Captain Fisher. He retired from the military in 1947.

== Later years ==
Around 1947 Fisher began to experience health problems that required him to spend much of the latter half of the year in and out of hospitals and forced his retirement from the U.S. Army on December 31, 1947. Fisher spent his later years in Xenia, Ohio, where he was a civilian employee at Wright-Patterson Air Force Base, east of Dayton, Ohio. In 1961 Fisher received a certificate of service from U.S. Air Force Secretary Eugene M. Zuckert, honoring "Fifty Years of faithful Federal service."

== Death and legacy ==
Fisher, who suffered from hypertension and blindness in his last years, died on November 22, 1985, at the age of 90 in Xenia, Greene County, Ohio. Fisher's remains are interred at Valley View Memorial Gardens near Xenia. The remains of Mary Myall Fisher (1905–1987), Fisher's wife, are buried beside him.

== Awards and tributes ==
- Distinguished Service Cross
- Purple Heart
- Army Commendation Medal for his service with the ROTC at Wilberforce University
- Croix de Guerre with gold star (France)
- Mexican Service Medal
- Victory Medal
- American Defense Service Medal
- American Campaign Medal
- World War II Victory Medal

The Wilberforce ROTC alumni, class of 1942, organized a tribute to Fisher in Chicago, Illinois, on July 22, 1983. During the gathering Fisher's former students and military friends noted that he had served as a role model for the Wilberforce cadets. Known for his "booming" voice, strict discipline, and military "spit and polish," Fisher also successfully established an "esprit de corps" among the Wilberforce cadets and taught them to be "tough and resilient."
