= Allen Greer =

Allen Greer might refer to:

- Allen Eddy Greer, Australian herpetologist
- Allen James Greer (1878–1964), officer in the United States Army
