= John R. Fox =

US Army Medal of Honor recipient (1915–1944)

John Robert Fox
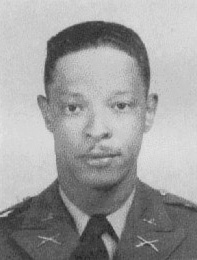
- John Fox posthumously received the Medal of Honor in 1997 for actions during World War II
- Born: May 18, 1915; Cincinnati, Ohio, U.S.
- Died: December 26, 1944 (aged 29); Sommocolonia, Italy
- Burial place: Colebrook Cemetery, Whitman, Massachusetts
- Military career
- Allegiance: United States of America
- Branch: United States Army
- Service years: 1940–1944
- Rank: First Lieutenant
- Units: 598th Field Artillery Battalion, 366th Infantry Regiment, 92nd Infantry Division
- Conflicts: World War II: Italian Campaign †
- Awards: Medal of Honor; Bronze Star; Purple Heart

John Robert Fox (May 18, 1915 – December 26, 1944) was a United States Army first lieutenant who was killed in action after calling in artillery fire on the enemy during World War II. In 1997, he was posthumously awarded the Medal of Honor, the nation's highest military decoration for valor, for his actions on December 26, 1944, in the vicinity of Sommocolonia, Italy. He asked that American artillery fire on his own location; it is believed that he did this because he was in an area overrun with German soldiers.

Fox and six other African Americans who served in World War II were awarded the Medal of Honor on January 12, 1997. The Medal of Honor was posthumously presented to Fox by President Bill Clinton on January 13, 1997, during a Medal of Honor ceremony for the seven recipients at the White House in Washington, D.C. These seven were the only black Medal of Honor recipients for World War II.

== Biography ==
Fox was born in Cincinnati, Ohio, on May 18, 1915, the eldest of three children. He was raised in Wyoming, Ohio, and attended Ohio State University. He transferred to Wilberforce University, participating in ROTC under Captain Aaron R. Fisher, a highly decorated World War I veteran. Fox graduated with a degree in engineering and received a commission as a U.S. Army second lieutenant in 1941.

=== Military service ===
During World War II, Fox was in the 92nd Infantry Division, known as the Buffalo Soldiers, a segregated African American division. Lt. Fox was a forward observer of the 598th Artillery Battalion, supporting the 366th Infantry Regiment of the division. On December 26, 1944, Fox was part of a small forward observer party that volunteered to stay behind in the Italian village of Sommocolonia, in the Serchio River Valley. American forces had been forced to withdraw from the village after it had been overrun by the Germans. From his position on the second floor of a house, Fox called in defensive artillery fire. As the Wehrmacht soldiers continued attacking, Fox radioed the artillery to bring its fire closer to his position, eventually ordering to fire directly on his position.

The soldier who received the message, Fox's close friend, Lt. Otis Zachary (1917–2009), was stunned, knowing that Fox had little chance to survive, but Fox said, "Fire it! There's more of them than there are of us. Give them hell!" The resulting artillery barrage killed Fox and approximately 100 German soldiers surrounding his position. Fox's sacrifice gained time for U.S. forces to organize a counterattack. The village was recaptured by January 1, 1945.

Fox was buried in Colebrook Cemetery in Whitman, Massachusetts. On April 15, 1982, Fox was posthumously awarded the Distinguished Service Cross; the initial award recommendation had been lost.

=== Medal of Honor ===
In the early 1990s, the US Army determined that black soldiers had been denied consideration for the Medal of Honor in World War II because of race discrimination. In 1993, the U.S. Army commissioned Shaw University in Raleigh, North Carolina, to research and determine if there was racial disparity in the Medal of Honor nomination and awarding process. The study found that there was systematic discrimination; it recommended in 1996 that ten African American veterans of World War II be awarded the Medal of Honor. In October 1996, Congress passed a bill to allow President Bill Clinton to award the Medal of Honor to these former soldiers. Seven of the ten, including Fox, were approved, and awarded the Medal of Honor (six had Distinguished Service Crosses upgraded to the Medal of Honor) on January 12, 1997.

A day later, President Clinton awarded the Medal of Honor to the seven soldiers in a formal ceremony, but six awards were made posthumously and received by family members. Fox's widow accepted the Medal of Honor on his behalf. Vernon Baker was the only living recipient of the medal at the time.

=== Other honors ===
After the war, the citizens of Sommocolonia erected a monument to nine men who were killed during the artillery barrage: eight Italian soldiers and Lt. Fox.

In 2005, the toy company Hasbro introduced a 12-inch action figure "commemorating Lt. John R. Fox as part of its G.I. Joe Medal-of-Honor series."

Sommocolonia dedicated a peace park in memory of Fox and his unit in 2000.

American Legion Post 631, located in Fox's birthplace of Cincinnati, Ohio, is named for Fox.

== Military awards ==
Fox's decorations and awards include:

Badge	Combat Infantryman Badge		
1st row	Medal of Honor		
2nd row	Bronze Star Medal	Purple Heart	American Defense Service Medal
3rd row	American Campaign Medal	European–African–Middle Eastern Campaign Medal with 1 campaign star	World War II Victory Medal

== Medal of Honor citation ==
Fox's Medal of Honor citation reads:

The President of the United States in the name of The Congress takes pride in presenting the Medal of Honor posthumously to

First Lieutenant John R. Fox
United States Army

Citation:

For conspicuous gallantry and intrepidity at the risk of his life above and beyond the call of duty: First Lieutenant John R. Fox distinguished himself by extraordinary heroism at the risk of his own life on 26 December 1944 in the Serchio River Valley Sector, in vicinity of Sommocolonia, Italy. Lieutenant Fox was a member of Cannon Company, 366th Infantry, 92nd Infantry Division, acting as a forward observer, while attached to the 598th Field Artillery Battalion. Christmas Day in the Serchio Valley was spent in positions which had been occupied for some weeks. During Christmas night, there was a gradual influx of enemy soldiers in civilian clothes and by early morning the town was largely in enemy hands. An organized attack by uniformed German formations was launched around 0400 hours, 26 December 1944. Reports were received that the area was being heavily shelled by everything the Germans had, and although most of the U.S. infantry forces withdrew from the town, Lieutenant Fox and members of his observation party remained behind on the second floor of a house, directing defensive fires. Lieutenant Fox reported at 0800 hours that the Germans were in the streets and attacking in strength, He called for artillery fire increasingly close to his own position. He told his battalion commander, "That was just where I wanted it. Bring it 60 yards!" His commander protested that there was a heavy barrage in the area and bombardment would be too close. Lieutenant Fox gave his adjustment, requesting that the barrage be fired. The distance was cut in half. The Germans continued to press forward in large numbers, surrounding the position. Lieutenant Fox again called for artillery fire with the commander protesting again stating, "Fox, that will be on you!" The last communication from Lieutenant Fox was. "Fire it! There's more of them than there are of us. Give them hell!" The bodies of Lieutenant Fox and his party were found in the vicinity of his position when his position was taken. This action, by Lieutenant Fox, at the cost of his own life, inflicted heavy casualties, causing deaths of approximately 100 Germans, thereby delaying the advance of the enemy until infantry and artillery units could be reorganized to meet the attack. Lieutenant Fox's extraordinary valorous actions exemplify the highest traditions of the military service.

/S/ Bill Clinton

== See also ==
- Edward A. Carter Jr.
- Willy F. James Jr.
- Ruben Rivers
- Charles L. Thomas
- George Watson
- List of African-American Medal of Honor recipients
- Final protective fire
- Winter Line
