= Sommocolonia =

- Comune
- Comune di Sommocolonia
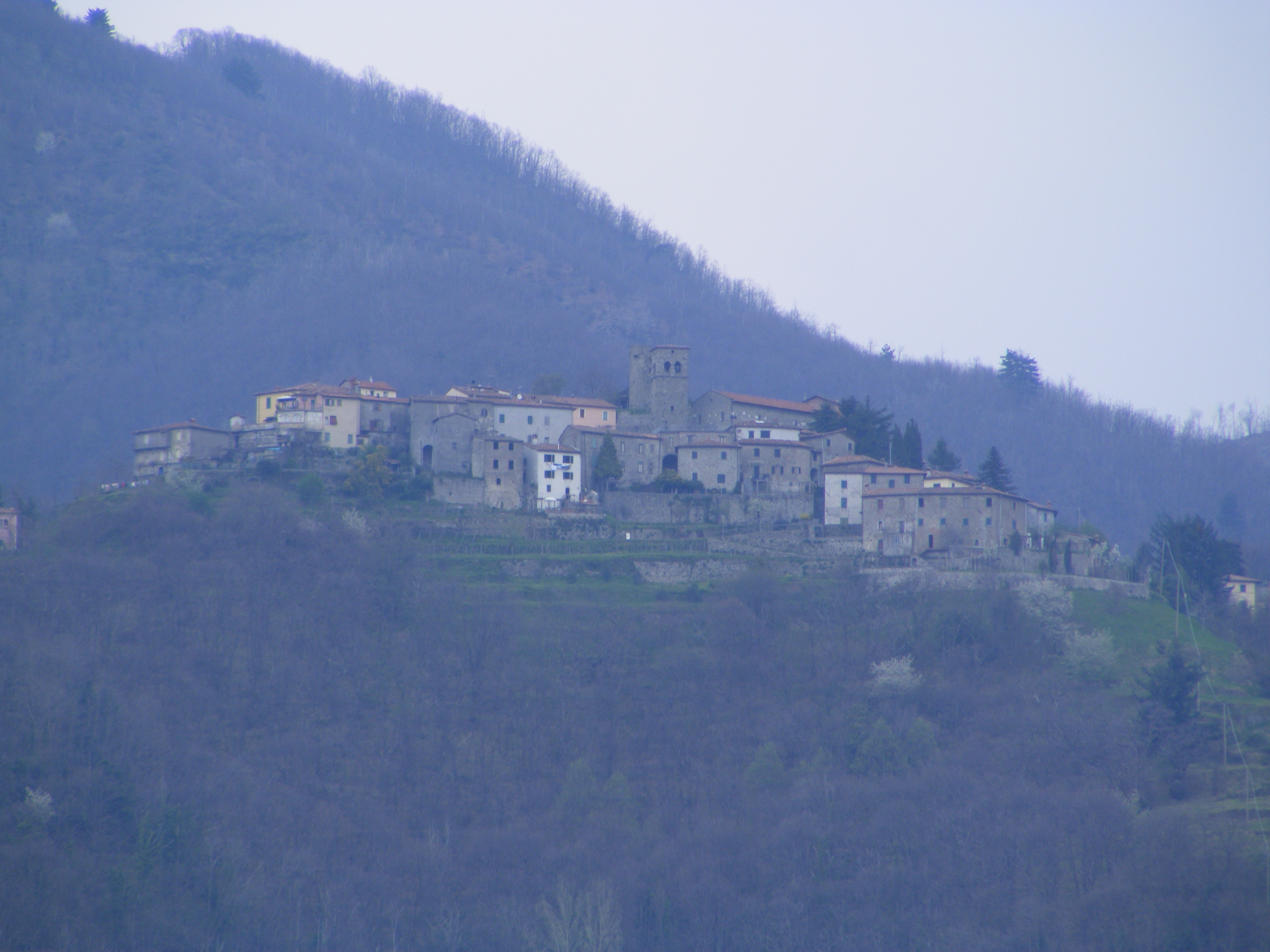
- Sommocolonia seen from Barga

- Location within Italy Location within Tuscany
- Country: Italy
- Region: Tuscany
- Province: Lucca (LU)

Population (2022)
  - Total: 22
- Time zone: UTC+1 (CET)
  - Summer (DST): UTC+2 (CEST)
- Postal code: 55051
- Dialing code: 0583

Sommocolonia is a hilltop village in Barga, Lucca, Italy. As of 2022, it had a population of 21. The village was heavily damaged during World War II, where it was the site of a battle between the Wehrmacht and the African American 92nd Infantry Division. The village's population has gradually decreased since the 1930s, as most residents left in search of work.

== History ==
Sommocolonia was once a Roman settlement. A vast majority of its buildings were constructed during the Middle Ages and Renaissance eras.

In the 1930s, there were approximately 400 villagers in Sommocolonia. The village only received telephone service and proper roads in the 1950s; prior to that, communication was made with nearby villages and towns through smoke signals.

=== World War II ===
During World War II, Sommocolonia was part of the Gothic Line. During the winter of 1944, the people of Sommocolonia had virtually nothing to eat other than chestnuts. This changed when African American soldiers with the United States Army's segregated 92nd Infantry Division arrived in the village and shared their field rations with them.

On 26 December 1944, soldiers with the 92nd Infantry Division clashed with the Wehrmacht's Austrian 4th Mountain Battalion in Sommocolonia during the Battle of Garfagnana. 70 American soldiers and 25 Italian partisans were surrounded in the village by the Austrian forces, some of which were dressed as partisans. The Austrian troops began burning buildings containing wounded American troops, shooting anyone who attempted to escape. Out of the 95 American soldiers and partisans involved in the battle, only 18 managed to fight their way out of the village at night and return to U.S. Fifth Army lines. After the battle, the Austrians rounded up villagers who were hiding in cellars during the battle and forced them out of the village.

During the battle, 1st Lt. John R. Fox with the 366th Infantry Regiment's 598th Artillery Battalion volunteered to stay behind in the village as a forward observer. While calling defensive artillery fire and a smoke screen to cover the escape of wounded American troops and partisans, he realized his observation post on the second floor of a house was surrounded by the Austrian soldiers. He then ordered a heavy concentration of mortar and 105 mm artillery shells on his own position. The artillery officer on the other end, Fox's close friend Otis Zachary, was stunned, knowing Fox's chances of survival would be very slim, but Fox demanded the barrage go ahead, saying "Fire it! There's more of them than there are of us. Give them hell!" as his last transmission. The resulting barrage killed Fox and approximately 100 Austrian troops surrounding his position. Fox's sacrifice halted the Wehrmacht's advance and allowed the U.S. Army to plan a counterattack. Sommocolonia was recaptured by 1 January 1945.

Due to the systemic racism within the United States Armed Forces at the time, Fox's sacrifice was not recognized, and there was no official record of the battle at Sommocolonia. After a review in 1982, Fox was posthumously awarded the Distinguished Service Cross for his actions. A later investigation in 1997 led to Fox and six other African American soldiers being awarded the Medal of Honor, the highest military decoration for valor in the United States Armed Forces.

The residents of Sommocolonia dedicated a monument to Fox and the eight Italian partisans who died while defending his position. In 2000, they also dedicated a peace park in memory of Fox and his unit.

=== Post-war ===
After World War II, Sommocolonia's population began to decline as most residents gradually left in search of work. Due to the village's shrinking and aging population, the village's school closed in 1975 and the village's market closed in the 1980s. Groceries are now delivered to the town by a converted ambulance.

The village saw an increase of visitors in the 2010s. Around 2018, the village received funding from Barga's mayor to build a cultural center and the town's first bar in 30 years.

== Geography ==
Sommocolonia is 6.3 kilometres (3.9 mi) southeast of Barga. It is located in the Serchio river valley.
