= James Harden Daugherty =

American writer (1923–2015)

- Military career
- Unit: 92nd Infantry Division
- Conflicts: World War II: Italian Campaign

James Harden Daugherty (1923–2015) served in the only African-American infantry division to see action in Europe during World War II during the 92nd's Italian Campaign. After the war, Daugherty returned to live in Maryland, where he encountered Jim Crow laws that segregated African Americans from whites in many aspects of life. Daugherty became the first African American to serve as a member of the school board of Montgomery County, Maryland. After the war, he was recognized for his bravery during World War II by receiving the Bronze Star Medal and the Combat Infantryman Badge.

He wrote a self-published autobiography, The Buffalo Saga: A Story from World War II U.S. Army 92nd Infantry Division known as the Buffalo Soldiers.

== Drafted ==
During World War II, Daugherty had a job working for the U.S. government in Washington, D.C. for the Bureau of Engraving and Printing, and believed that because of this he would not be drafted into the military. However, in December 1943 he received a draft letter ordering him to report for duty; Daugherty was 19 years old at the time. He had very mixed feelings about serving in the military, due to the reality of living under Jim Crow laws that deprived him and other African Americans of many of their civil rights and liberties. He felt that it was difficult for him to justify going to another country to fight for someone else's freedom under the flag of a country that denied him his own. Daugherty, recalling his feelings about being drafted as a second-class citizen, describes thinking: "How dare they draft me and force me to go into a war when I was living in D.C. and had to go to segregated schools... I was fighting for two evils, the Nazis in Germany and my own country that was doing the same kind of things."

Still, he reported for duty, and was assigned to the all-black 92nd Infantry Division, known from its World War I nickname as the Buffalo Soldiers, a term given to African-American troops by Native Americans during the late 19th century. Although the 92nd had significant casualties, Daugherty recounts how the military did not send replacement troops to keep their numbers up. As units within his division were cut down through attrition, they were forced to continue on without reinforcements. Daugherty recalls asking another soldier why the officers couldn't just call up replacements, and he replied: "Look, bud, they don’t train colored soldiers to fight…they train them to load ships, and you don’t expect them to put white boys in a Negro outfit, do you? What do you think this is, a democracy or something?"

He saw combat action in Italian Campaign during late 1943 and early 1944, including operations in the area between Bologna and Florence. Daugherty expressed the opinion that the 92nd was meant to keep German troops occupied in Italy, preventing them from being deployed to fight against the Soviet Army in eastern Europe, or against the Allied forces moving against the German frontier along the Rhine. This was perceived as a policy of using African-American soldiers in a secondary role, instead of including them in the main thrust in the north.

Daugherty narrowly escaped death after surviving a mortar attack. He describes the surprise that other soldiers had at seeing him walking around afterwards with a bright shard of steel shrapnel, which he had received during the barrage, sticking out of his helmet, and which came within 1/4 of an inch (0.6 cm) from penetrating his skull.

== Back home ==
After the war ended, Daugherty returned to his home in Maryland, and ended up working in the same job at the Bureau of Engraving and Printing that he had held before being drafted. He used money from the G.I. Bill to put himself through college at Howard University, and eventually became the first African American to serve on the local Montgomery County School Board, one of the largest school districts in the U.S. He also had a distinguished career working for the United States Public Health Service in administrative capacities, as well as serving for many years in a governor-appointed position with the Maryland School for the Deaf.

Daugherty describes that he received no hero's welcome after coming home from World War II. Instead, he and the other African Americans who had fought in the war came home to face the same situation that they had left, including legally-sanctioned racial discrimination and segregation. The African American soldiers who served in World War II were overlooked when it came time to hand out medals, and it was not until many years later, and after significant changes in American life and law, that medals began to be awarded to some of the members of the 92nd Infantry Division, some of them posthumously. In 1997 two soldiers from the 92nd finally received the Congressional Medal of Honor from President Bill Clinton. Daugherty himself received the Bronze Star Medal for heroic achievement, and a Combat Infantryman Badge for outstanding performance of duty in action against the enemy.

In his book, Daugherty describes how he chose to face the racism in his country after returning home. He writes: "We are home now though our flame flickers low. Will you fan it with the winds of freedom, or will you smother it with the sands of humiliation? Will it be that we fought for the lesser of two evils? Or is there this freedom and happiness for all men?" Dedicating his life to working in public health to help all people regardless of race or background was how Daugherty chose to respond to this challenge.

== Writing his memoirs ==
As part of his determination to grapple with the struggle of returning home from the war to a Jim Crow America, Daugherty wrote the original manuscript of his autobiography in 1947, two years after the end of World War II. He wrote it down by hand, and his wife Dorothy then typed out numerous copies. She relates how emotional it was for her to do this: "It's like I fought that war, all of the emotions that I experienced—crying, laughing—it was so much a part of me, having done it so many times."

Finally, after years of having the manuscript lying sealed away, in 2009 Daugherty published his autobiography through self-publishing service Xlibris promoted it, including being interviewed on the National Public Radio program All Things Considered. Daugherty expressed in this interview that although he is pleased to see the current situation in the U.S. military where African Americans are not segregated, and can aspire to hold even the highest positions of power and influence within the system, that he still is reluctant to endorse using the military to gain civil rights for people. He firmly stated that: "War is never the answer."

After his book was published, his home town of Silver Spring, Maryland, officially declared July 28 as "Buffalo Soldier James Daugherty Day".

== See also ==
- Miracle at St. Anna
