= Allen J. Greer =

United States Army officer

Allen James Greer
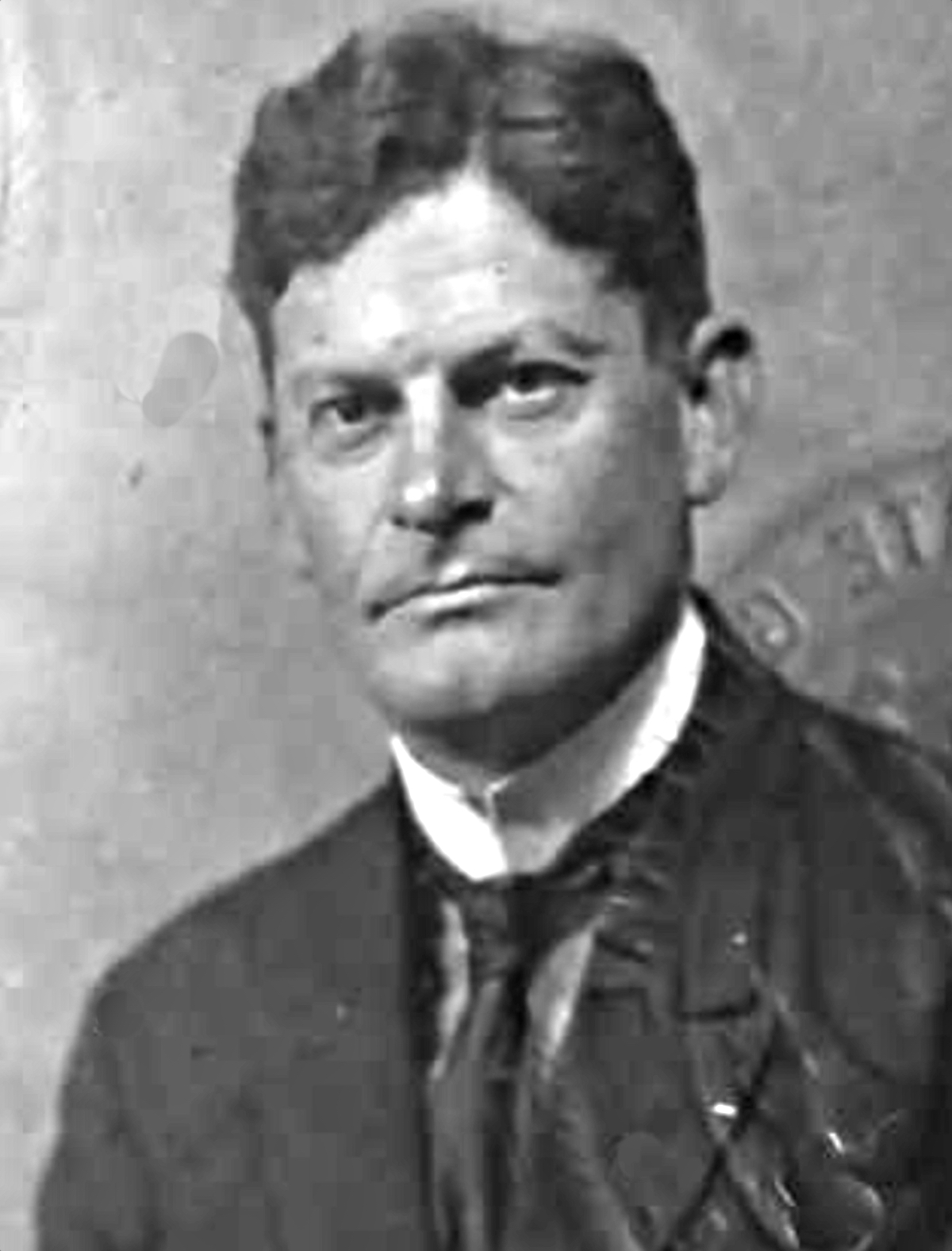
- Allen James Greer, Medal of Honor recipient
- Born: August 11, 1878; Memphis, Tennessee, US
- Died: March 16, 1964 (aged 85); Orange, California, US
- Burial place: Arlington National Cemetery
- Military career
- Allegiance: United States
- Branch: United States Army
- Service years: 1898–1940
- Rank: Colonel
- Units: 92nd Division; 4th Infantry Regiment; 7th Infantry Regiment; 28th Infantry Regiment
- Conflicts: Philippine–American War; World War I
- Awards: Medal of Honor

Allen James Greer (1878–1964) was an officer in the United States Army who received the Medal of Honor for actions near Majada, Laguna Province, Philippines, July 2, 1901. He was chief of staff of the 92nd Division during World War 1.

== Military career ==
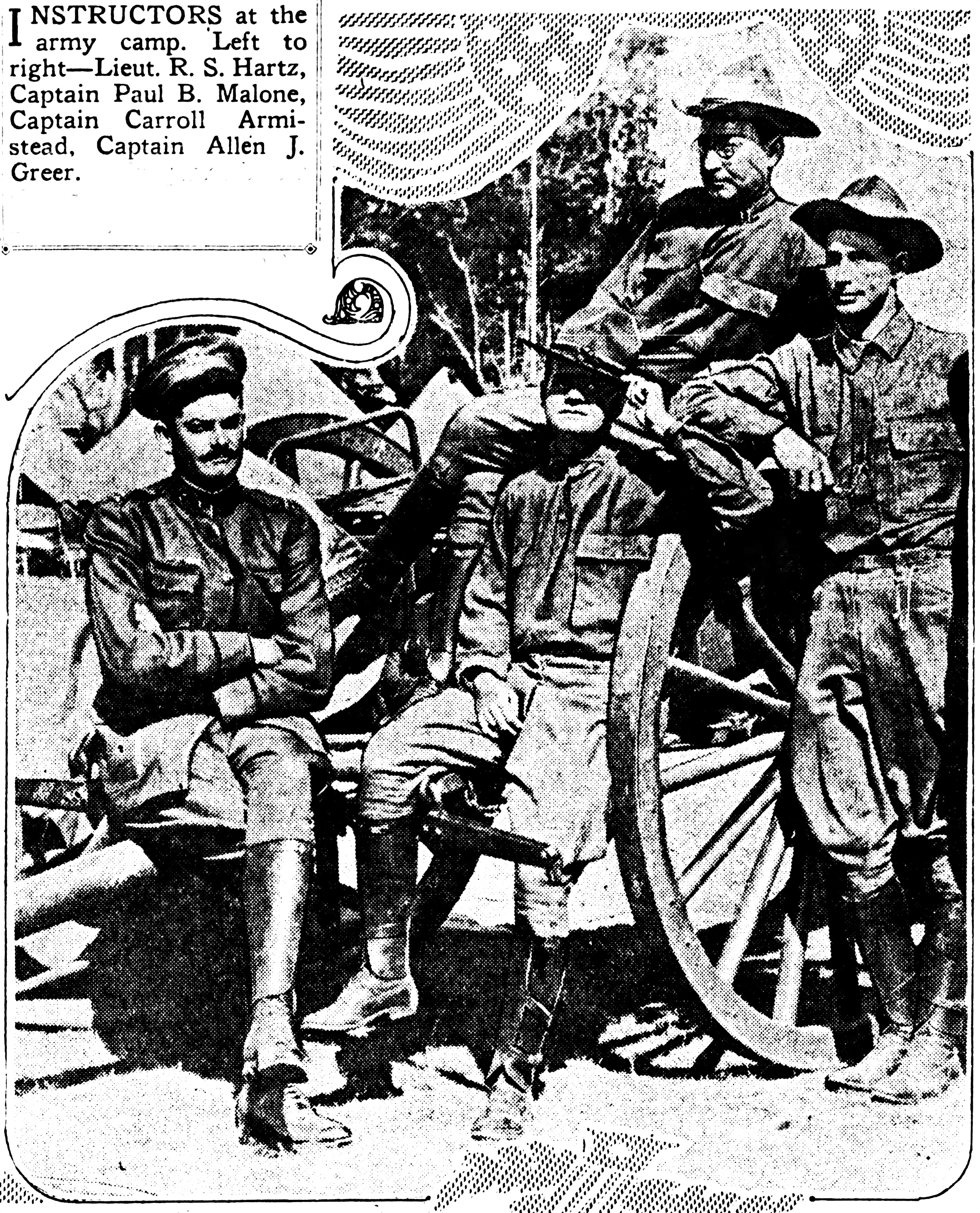
Captain Allen J. Greer, right, was an instructor at a U.S. Army training camp in San Francisco in 1915. The others are, left to right, Lt. R.S. Hartz, Capt. Paul B. Malone, and Capt. Carroll Armistead.

=== Medal of Honor ===
He was awarded the Medal of Honor on March 10, 1902, for his action on July 2, 1901, during the Philippine Insurrection, when he charged alone against an insurgent outpost with his pistol, killing one, wounding two, and capturing three, with their rifles and equipment. The action took place near Majada, Laguna Province.

=== Infantry ===
After his graduation from college, Greer, with J. Walter Canada, raised sixty volunteers for duty in the Spanish–American War (Company L), and he was made their lieutenant. The company, also known as the 4th Tennessee Volunteer Infantry, did duty in Cuba under Captain Cordell Hull. It was composed of the members of Greer's college graduating class.

Greer was commissioned in July 1898 as a second lieutenant in the Army. During the Philippine Insurrection he commanded a company of Philippine Scouts in Cavite Province.

In 1904, as a lieutenant, Greer moved from the 4th Infantry to the 28th Infantry, and in 1908, he was a recruiting officer with the 12th Cavalry Regiment, stationed at Fort Sam Houston, Texas.

Greer was an honorary graduate of the Army School of the Line in 1912. In 1913, he was a captain with the 16th Infantry Regiment, and in August 1914, he was stationed in or near El Paso, Texas, with that regiment. Greer was a graduate of the Army Staff College in 1915, and in August of that year he was the adjutant at a new Army training camp at the Presidio.

He served with John J. Pershing in the Punitive Expedition in Mexico in 1916.

At the beginning of United States involvement in World War One, Captain Greer was in Tennessee, where he and Lieutenant-Colonel Luke Lea began a volunteer light-artillery unit, which later became the 114th Field Artillery.

In the American Expeditionary Force in Europe, Colonel Greer was chief of staff of the 92nd Infantry Division, composed of black troops, except for higher officers. Military historian Robert H. Ferrell wrote that Greer "took assignments because of the opportunity for promotion and perhaps opportunity to move out of the division to more attractive" positions.

He was a graduate of the Field Artillery School Advanced Course in 1923, and he graduated from the Army War College in 1925.

In 1927 he transferred from the infantry to the artillery.

In postwar service, Greer was an instructor with the organized army reserves in Buffalo, New York.

=== Legal duties ===
In 1908 Greer was named an Army judge advocate. He was sent to Mindanao, Philippines, as part of the 28th Infantry. He was later transferred to the 7th Infantry. In 1910, he was ordered to St. Louis, Missouri, where he was to be acting judge advocate in the Department of the Missouri.

Around 1913 Greer was detailed to attend a military law school at Fort Leavenworth, after which he was selected to defend Colonel Lewis E. Goudier, who was accused of interfering with the administration of the Army's aviation school in San Diego, California.

=== Civilian Conservation Corps ===
In May 1933, Greer was appointed commandant of Group or District 4 of the Civilian Conservation Corps in Tompkins County, New York.

He was one of the officers who "helped restore order following a mutiny of Negro recruits" in the CCC camp at Preston, New York. He was at the camp for reveille on July 8, 1933, but "satisfied that the trouble was over, [he] left the camp early." The black corpsmen had protested when two Negro clerks were replaced by whites. Six were arrested and 34 others were "sent back to Harlem."

=== Retirement ===
In April 1940, the "Army Orders" stated that "Col. Allen J. Greer, Field Artillery, [is] relieved from Fort Hayes, O., and, for the convenience of the government[,] will proceed to his home and await retirement."

"Army Orders" stated in September 1940: "By direction of the President, Col. Allen J. Greer, Field Artillery, upon his own application[,] is retired from active service effective Sept. 30, 1940."

== Opinions and persuasion ==
=== Cavalry ===
In 1915, Captain Greer, as an instructor at the Presidio training camp, paid tribute to the horse as a still-valid tool in twentieth-century warfare. In a class lecture, he said that despite the advent of the airplane, the cavalry was still best for gathering information, patrolling, reconnoitering, and harassing the enemy. The leader any given horse-mounted scouting unit had to be equipped with a compass, a map, field glasses, pencil and notebook, message blanks, and a watch.

He noted the importance of the "getaway man" on the battlefield, a rider who would be detached from the scouting party but still be in touch with it.

=== African-American soldiers ===
==== Letter to senator ====
In 1919, Colonel Greer was stationed in Washington, D.C., between assignments in Europe. Self-identified as "General Staff, U.S.A," he wrote a letter to U.S. Senator Kenneth D. McKellar of Tennessee which contained, according to a newspaper account, "startling revelations as to negro troops failing to measure up to the required standard of efficiency and valor while in active service." According to historian Robert H. Ferrell, Greer also sent letters to "officers he thought might enlighten the department on the use of African-American troops" in the Army.

He gave out copies of his letter to reporters in Washington with the aim of getting publicity for his views, not only "from a military point of view but from that which all southerners have. I refer to the question of negro officers and negro troops." He noted that he had been chief of staff of the mostly black 92nd Division since it was organized in October 1917,

The letter stated:

To start with, all company officers of infantry, machine guns and engineers were negroes, as were most of the artillery lieutenants and many of the doctors. Gradually as their incompetence became perfectly evident to all, the engineers and artillerymen were replaced by white officers. ...

The letter said that the black soldiers of an American regiment attached to a French corps failed "in all their missions, laid down and sneaked to the rear, until they were withdrawn. Thirty officers of this regiment alone were reported for cowardice or failure to prevent their men from retreating."

Greer claimed that the 92nd Division had "had about thirty cases of rape, among which was one where twenty-two men at Camp Grant (Illinois) raped one woman, and we have had eight (I believe) reported in France with about fifteen attempts besides."

There have been numerous accidental shootings, several murders, and also several cases of patrols or sentinels shooting at each other. . . . at the same time, so strict has been the supervision and training that many officers passing through our areas would remark that our men actually had the outer marks of better discipline than the other divisions. . . . Gen. Bullard asked me my estimate[,] and I said they could do anything but fight.

Of the black troops, Greer said, "Accuracy and the ability to describe facts is lacking in all[,] and most of them are just plain liars in addition." He stated: "They have, in fact, been dangerous to no one but themselves and women."

Historian Ferrell wrote:

But what was surprising was his [Greer's] animus against African-Americans on the rape question. One might well ask how he could have said such things. On this point, he provided no answers, only statements. . . . The colonel blamed black misconduct of this sort entirely on black officers. In regiments of engineers and artillery where supervised by white officers there had been only a single case of rape.

He quoted Greer as writing: "The undoubted truth is that the colored officers neither control nor care to control the men. They themselves have been engaged largely in the pursuit of French women, it being their first opportunity to meet white women who did not treat them as servants."

==== Response ====
Editors of black publications The Crisis of New York and The Eagle of Washington, D.C., began a movement to have Greer fired from the Army.

According to W. E. B. Du Bois, the publisher of The Crisis, the Post Office Department held up the magazine's distribution of its May 1919 issue because of "articles in the magazine related to prejudice alleged to have been shown toward American negro officers in France by white officers." That issue contained the full text of Greer's letter.

The League for Democracy, an organization of Negro officers, wrote an objection to Secretary of War Newton D. Baker, stating: "We cannot permit our descendants to read this letter [Greer's] in future histories and look upon our graves with scorn and contempt. . . . In this matter our slogan is 'Greer must be tried and the race vindicated.'"

=== Oath of allegiance ===
Lieutenant-Colonel Greer was a prosecutor in the noted June 1922 court-martial of Major Malcolm Wheeler-Nicholson, who was convicted of violating the 96th Article of War in publishing an open letter to President Warren G. Harding critical of the Army's high command.

Wheeler-Nicholson based his defense on freedom of speech, but, as The New York Times put it, Greer argued "that when an officer or soldier took the oath of allegiance [,] he waived these rights. He said he would sum up the whole history of the case in the words of a song, 'Everybody's Out of Step but Jim,' referring to Major Nicholson."

Greer said that the Army way of doing things might not be perfect but constructive criticism was always welcome. He said of Nicholson's stance: "[A]ny attempt to restrain him has been tyranny. Any orders applying to him which he does not like are styled Prussianism. The service at large apparently meant nothing to him."

=== Type of cannon ===
According to Greer, while serving under Gen. Douglas MacArthur after 1927, Greer promoted the use of the 105 mm cannons over the 75 mms by writing an article which drew the support of his commander-in-chief."

"I knew I was right or I would not have written the article," he told MacArthur.

== Personal life ==
=== Birth and education ===
Allen Greer was born August 11, 1878, in Memphis, Tennessee, the son of Judge James M. Greer of Mississippi and Betty Buckner Allen of Lexington, Kentucky. He had two brothers, Autrey and Rowan Adams.

He earned a Bachelor of Arts from the University of Tennessee in 1898, a Bachelor of Laws from the University of Minnesota in 1907, and a Master of Arts from the University of California, Los Angeles, in 1938.

=== Marriages and children ===
==== First marriage ====
Greer, who in 1903 was described as one of the "social lions" of San Antonio, Texas, was married on June 1 of that year to Augusta Goodhue of Beaumont, Texas, the daughter of Mr. and Mrs. John H. Goodhue, in Trinity Episcopal Church, San Francisco, California. It was "one of the events of the season in Army society." The next day they sailed for the Philippines, where Lieutenant Greer was to be stationed with the 4th Infantry Regiment.

The two returned to the United States the next year aboard the USAT Thomas. It was reported they had "quarreled and separated." A newspaper said that "At every meal they sat at the same table without speaking to each other." Upon landing, Greer went to the Palace Hotel and his wife to the California Hotel.

It was noted that Mrs. Greer had been the object of "considerable attention" aboard the ship by a fellow passenger, Ulysses S. Grant III, who "last night spent the evening with her at her apartments, which she shares with Mrs. Lake, the wife of a Honolulu hotel man."

Mrs. Greer told a reporter that she and her husband had "agreed that I shall, if I can, get a divorce on the grounds of incompatibility. If not, we will live apart. . . . It is outrageous for anybody to intimate that Lieutenant Grant came between my husband and myself. . . . We cannot live together and have agreed to disagree."

Grant said: "I never met Lieutenant Greer and his wife until the Thomas was ten days out from Manila. . . . What little attention I have shown the lady is what any gentleman surely could and can show without being criticized.

Grant and Mrs. Greer went to the theater together in San Francisco but each denied that their relationship was the cause of any rupture in the Greer marriage.

An uncontested divorce was granted to Greer in December 1904 on the ground of desertion. He alleged that his wife refused to live with him in Fort Snelling, Minnesota. She resumed her birth name.

==== Second marriage ====
In 1913, Captain Greer was again a husband. His wife was costumed as a "colonial girl" at a dress ball presented by the Presidio Officers' Club.

By 1914, they had a son, Allen, and a daughter. They were divorced in San Francisco in 1919.

In 1919, Greer lived at 2701 Green Street, near the San Francisco Presidio. At the time of the 1920 census Greer was single and living on a military base in Germany.

In 1933, Greer broke his collarbone when he and his daughter were in an automobile accident in Valparaiso, Indiana, as he drove her back to the University of Wisconsin.

==== Third marriage ====
In 1927, Greer met Mary Owings Smith of Olympia, Washington, when he was stationed at Fort Lewis in that state. Later that year, he was living in San Francisco, at 2640 Van Ness Avenue. Colonel Greer, 51, and Smith, 25, were married November 30, 1929, in San Francisco. They sailed the succeeding week for the Philippines, where Greer was to be stationed.

At the time of the 1940 census, Greer was single and living in Buffalo, New York.

=== Civilian life ===
After leaving the Army, Greer wrote for the North American Newspaper Alliance. He said he was a military analyst for the Buffalo Evening News in Europe and Japan during World War II and that he wrote about the Bikini atomic-bomb tests in 1946.

=== Retirement and death ===
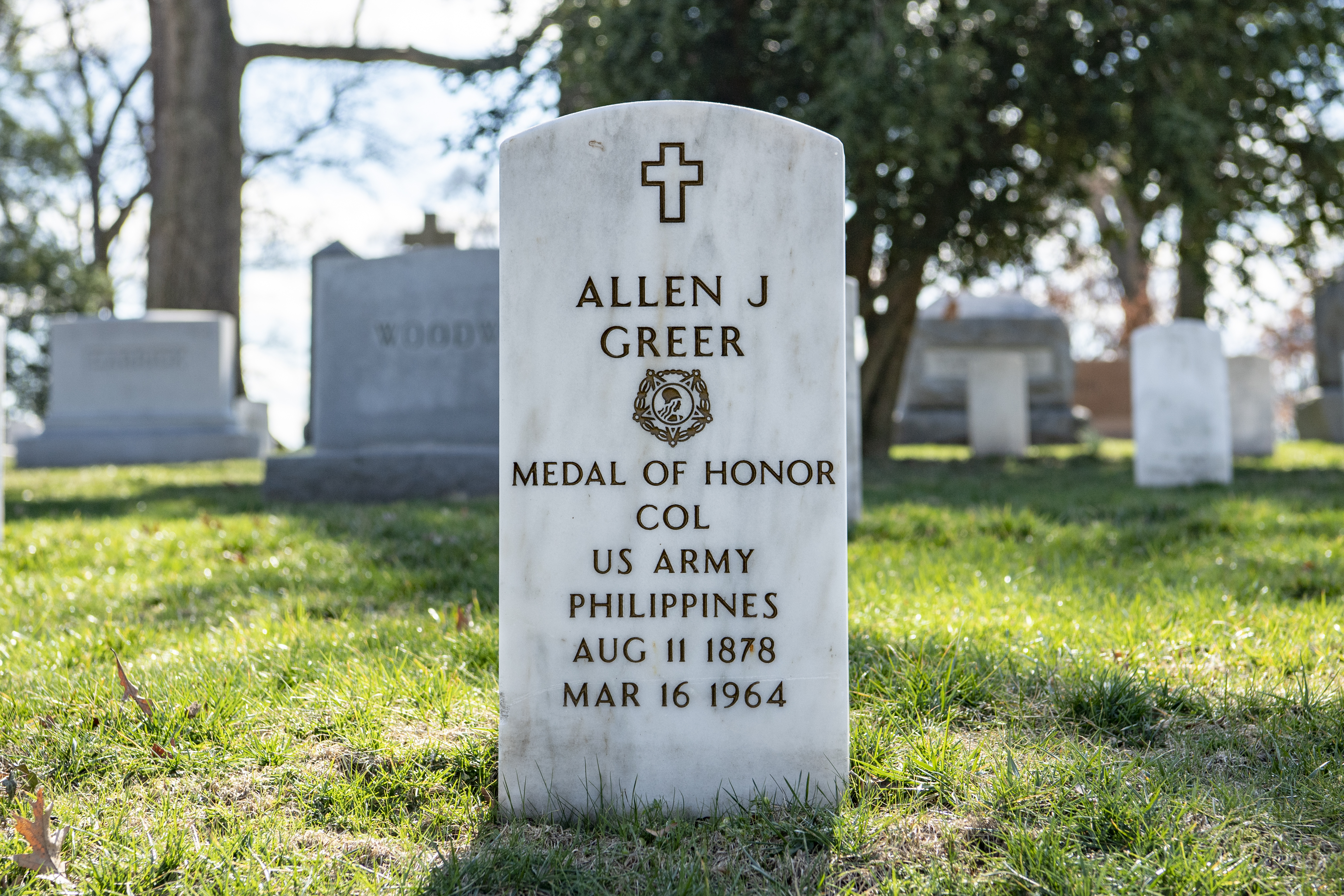
Grave at Arlington National Cemetery

In 1961, Greer was living in San Clemente, California, with his son, Allen Jr., and daughter-in-law. A reporter described him as "mellow," "scholarly" and "almost a disinterested spectator" of the modern world who "walks around his neighborhood and occasionally has a beer." Greer died on March 16, 1964, in Orange, California, at the age of 85. He is buried at Arlington National Cemetery in Arlington, Virginia.

== See also ==
- List of Medal of Honor recipients
- List of Philippine–American War Medal of Honor recipients
