= 679th Tank Destroyer Battalion =

- Active: 1943–1945
- Disbanded: 27 October 1945
- Country: United States
- Allegiance: Army
- Part of: Independent unit
- Equipment: 3 inch Gun M5
- Engagements: World War II: La Spezia

The 679th Tank Destroyer Battalion was a tank destroyer battalion of the United States Army active during the Second World War. The unit was activated in June 1943 and shipped overseas in January 1945. After arrival in France, the unit was sent to the Mediterranean front. After arrival, the unit was attached to the 92nd Infantry Division. Like the 614th Tank Destroyer Battalion, it was one of the three segregated tank destroyer battalions that participated in combat during the Second World War.

== Early service ==
The 679th Tank Destroyer Battalion was activated on 26 June 1943 in Camp Hood. It was the last American tank destroyer battalion to be activated. It was staffed exclusively by black American soldiers. Initially training was in self-propelled tank destroyers, but in July 1943 the unit was converted to a towed outfit. Training continued in November 1944 Lieutenant Colonel Donald McGrayne became commander of the 679th Tank Destroyer Battalion. In December orders arrived to prepare for overseas service, the unit was moved New York and in January 1945 the battalion departed for Europe, where the soldiers arrived on 21 January 1945. In February 1945 new orders arrived and the battalion was moved from France to Italy.

== Combat in Italy ==
On 6 March 1945 the 679th Tank Destroyer Battalion was attached to the 92nd Infantry Division, one of the two segregated infantry divisions. The 92d had been fighting in Italy since 1944. On 18 March 1945 the battalion 'fired our first round in anger at the enemy.' The battalion was employed in support of attacks of the 92nd Infantry Division and combat around the Punta Bianca peninsula, near La Spezia, Italy against coastal artillery guns until the end of the war.

== Post War Service ==
After the Second World War the unit was employed as guards, watching over munition depots and prisoners. Several men of the battalion died in an accident at Viareggio, Italy. On 18 July 1945, a store of enemy mines exploded and the nearby Red Cross Club was caught in the blast. In total 24 soldiers were killed, of which 23 were Black Americans. From the 679th Tank Destroyer Battalion, three people died: Sergeant William E. Forster, Technicians Fifth Grade James Alford and Clarence L. Smith. The unit was eventually shipped back to the United States with the intent of being used against the Japanese army, but their surrender meant the unit had become superfluous. On 27 October 1945 the unit was disbanded.
