= 366th Infantry Regiment (United States) =

Segregated African American regiment

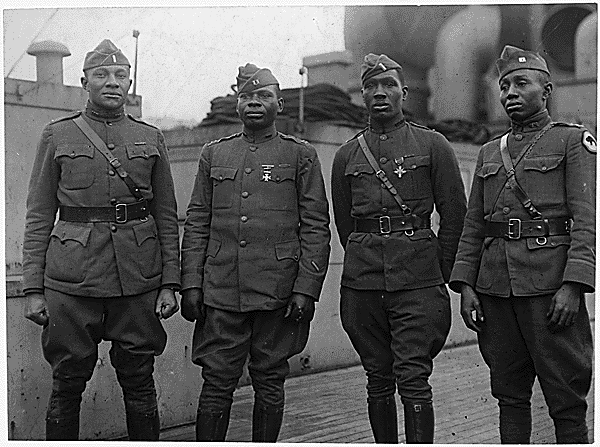
- Officers of the United States Army's 366th Infantry Regiment on board the RMS Aquitania, en route home from World War I. Left to right: Lieutenant Cleveland L. Abbott, Yankton, South Dakota; Captain Joseph L. Lowe, Pacific Grove, California; Lieutenant Aaron R. Fisher, Lyles, Indiana, recipient of Distinguished Service Cross; Captain E. White, Pine Bluff, Arkansas
- Active: August 1917–25 March 1919; 10 February 1941-28 March 1945
- Country: United States
- Branch: United States Army
- Type: Infantry
- Size: Regiment
- Garrison/HQ: Fort Devens, Massachusetts
- Motto: "Labor Conquers All Things."
- Engagements: World War I; World War II
- Battle honours: Meuse-Argonne Offensive; Rome-Arno Campaign

The 366th Infantry Regiment was a segregated African American regiment of the 92nd Infantry Division of the United States Army. The regiment served in World War I and World War II, and in 1941 guarded infrastructure in Maine, earning them the nickname, "The Black Guards of Maine."

During World War I, the 366th served in Saint-Dié-des-Vosges and in the Meuse–Argonne offensive in France. In World War II, they trained in northern Africa before undertaking guard duty throughout southern Italy, then moved to stations throughout northern Italy where they saw combat and took some 1,300 casualties.

In 1997, 1st Lieutenant John R. Fox posthumously received the Medal of Honor for his sacrifice during the 1944 battle of Sommocolonia, becoming one of just seven African Americans to receive the U.S. military's highest decoration for service during World War II.

== World War I ==
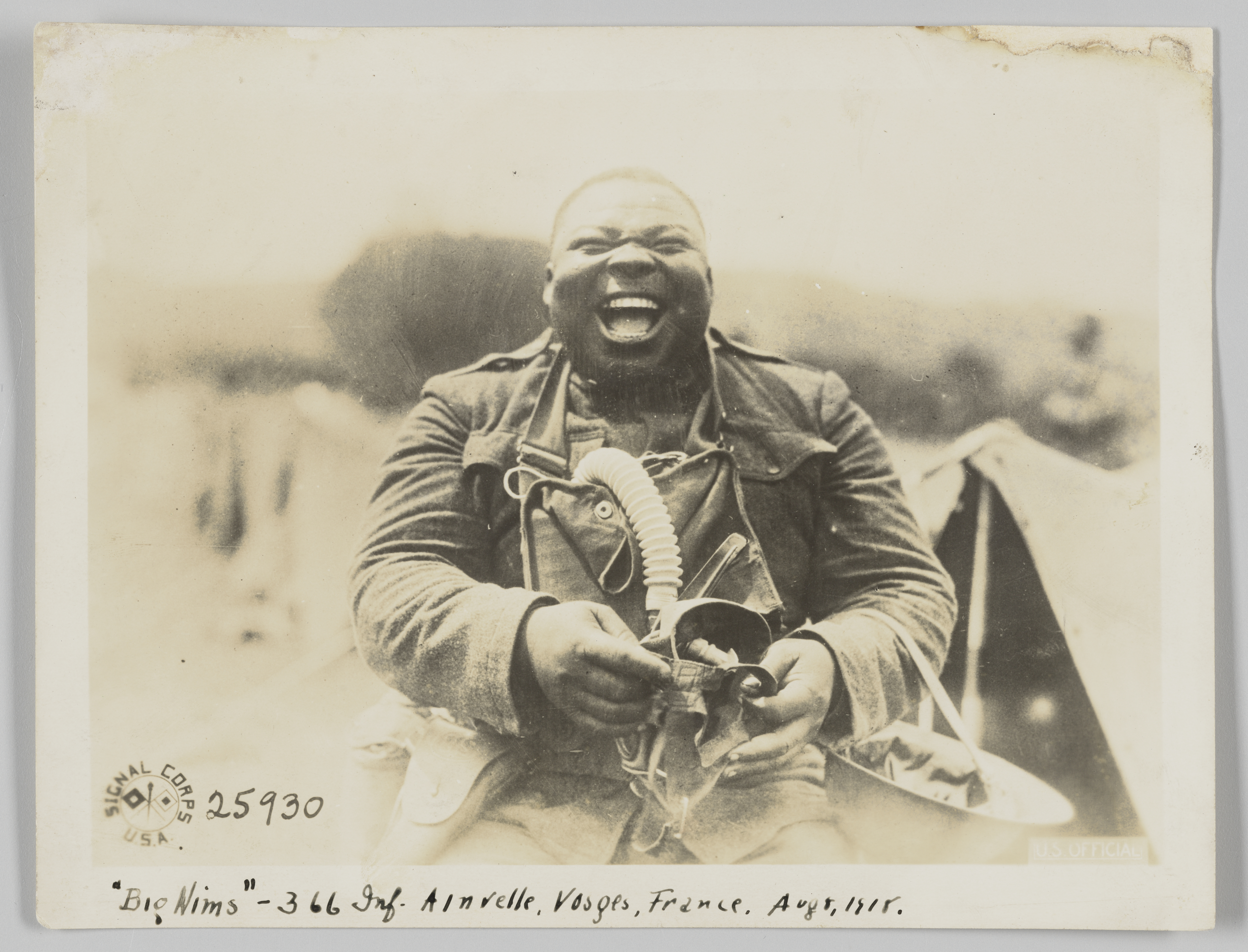
A soldier of the 366th Infantry Regiment in Ainvelle, Vosges, France, in August 1918

The 366th Infantry was established 16 August 1917 as part of the 92nd Infantry Division and stationed at Camp Dodge, Iowa, in November 1917. Along with the rest of the 92nd, the 366th trained there for five months before their deployment.

The regiments of the 92nd began leaving for Europe in May 1918. In France, they initially trained with the rest of the 92nd at Bourbonne-les-Bains, and on 21 August arrived at Saint-Dié-des-Vosges. As the 366th was arriving to relieve the 6th Infantry, enemy forces attempted to retake the village of Frapelle, a recent key loss for the Germans. The Germans razed the village, and the 366th lost two men and six were wounded. It was the first time the regiment had encountered flamethrowers in combat.

At Saint-Dié, the regiments were instructed in trench warfare and mountain patrols, although the mountainous terrain made training regimens difficult to complete. However, the challenging terrain also prevented extensive military operations, limiting the armies to "minor forays on one another's tranches" and "brief skirmishes between patrols out in no man's land." On 1 September, the 366th played a key role in holding off enemy forces as they attacked Ormont, and in mid-September a raiding party of the 366th captured five German soldiers, the first such capture in the division since its arrival.

The 92nd left Saint-Die on 19 September for Meuse-Argonne, where they worked building roads and transporting supplies, and occupied the Marbache sector until 24 October. In Centre de Resistance Seille, two men were killed and nine wounded over the course of the month of October.

On November 10 and 11, 365th and 366th took and held the Bois Voivrotte until November 14 when they were relieved by the French army.

Overall, from August to November 1918 the 366th saw approximately 29 men killed, 176 wounded and 135 gassed. The 92nd returned to the United States in March 1919.

The 366th Infantry was demobilized on 25 March 1919 at Fort Oglethorpe, Georgia, and reconstituted on 16 December 1940 in the Regular Army.

== World War II ==
The 366th Infantry Regiment was activated on 10 February 1941 at Fort Devens, Massachusetts and assigned to the Eastern Defense Command on 30 April 1942. They men trained at Camp Atterbury until March 1944, when they were sent to Camp Henry in Virginia to prepare to deploy.

=== Fort Devens ===
From February 1941 until November 1943, the 366th was based at Fort Devens in Massachusetts. Many soldiers who came from more southern parts of the United States struggled to adjust to the cold and snow. Several men died during this period, and at least one was buried in the cemetery at Fort Devens. Lieutenant Elmer Best, another enlisted member of the 366th from New York City, was killed in a gun accident during this time.

The approximately 3200 enlisted men of the 366th Infantry Regiment were accompanied at all times by between 126 and 180 officers. While the brigade was composed exclusively of soldiers of color, they were not all African-American: Several soldiers of East Asian descent were also enlisted in the 366th. The regiment was one of very few World War II units comprised both of African-American soldiers and African-American officers at both the junior and senior levels.

Also unique was the regiment's embedded services and its lack of attachment to a combat division. The 366th contained embedded anti-tank, cannon artillery, and medical detachment services. Most other regiments needed to call on other battalions to provide these services, but the 366th could move around more smoothly as they were self-sufficient in these areas. The regiment was also designated as "separate" in that they were not attached directly to a combat regiment, and were instead attached to commands above the division level. In order to enter combat, the 366th would need to attach itself to a combat division.

=== Africa ===
The 366th initially sailed from Hampton Roads, Virginia to Casablanca, and proceeded by train to Oran, Algeria, arriving 6 April 1944. There, they were mistreated and demoralized by white officers, and Commanding Officer Howard Queen was forbidden from entering the officers' club.

=== Southern Italy ===
In April 1944, the 366th sailed from Oran to Naples, Italy, where they were split up across southern Italy to guard Air Force installations for the Fifteenth Air Force Service Command. They provided security for the air bases and guarded weaponry, frequently playing softball games with other Allied units to maintain camaraderie. As the months progressed, however, the commanders raised concern that guard duty and limited training was "eroding combat readiness"

=== Northern Italy ===
In the fall of 1944, the 366th was instructed to move to Livorno, Italy to become the fourth regiment of the 92nd Division.

Commanded by Col.Howard Queen, they were the first and only combat regiment in United States military history commanded by an African American colonel.[4][1]

Despite Col. Queen's concern that the unit retain its cohesiveness and undergo further training, and despite 92nd Division commander Edward Almond's promise to provide 15 days of re-training as infantry, on 30 November 1944 the 366th was again split and its units assigned to corresponding battalions of the 92nd on the front lines:

366th Infantry Regiment assignments within the 92nd Infantry Division, northern Italy, 1944
Unit of the 366th	Attached to
Company E	3d Battalion, 371st Infantry (on the coast)
Intelligence and Reconnaissance Platoon	Divisional reconnaissance troop
B Company	3d Battalion, 371st
2nd Battalion (without Company E)	370th's forward positions (Serchio valley)
I Company	371st Infantry
Cannon company	370th Infantry
Antitank company	371st Infantry
K Company	370th Infantry
1st Battalion (Note: The 1st Battalion operated directly under the 92nd division and not under regimental command.)	Relieved the 3rd Battalion, 371st Infantry (coastal sector)

Almond told the soldiers of the 366th:

I did not send for you. Your Negro newspapers, Negro politicians, and white friends have insisted on your seeing combat and I shall see that you get combat and your share of the casualties.

Officers of the 366th were not assigned with their companies, leaving the soldiers "orphaned without trusted commanders". On 15 December 1944, Col. Queen was "evacuated for physical disability, and Lt. Col. Alonzo Ferguson made commander.

The 92nd division had been struggling to break through a series of caves and high fortifications, called the Green Line or the Gothic Line, that the Wehrmacht had constructed across Tuscany to prevent Allied troops from proceeding north. The 366th was sent to assist the 92nd in breaking through that line.

In the early morning of 26 December 1944, the Wehrmacht fired on the village of Sommocolonia, where soldiers from the 366th were supporting the 598th Field Artillery Battalion. The offensive was part of the Battle of Garfagnana, intended to advance the Wehrmacht to the port of Livorno where they could recapture Livorno and cut off Allied supply lines. In the ensuing combat, more than two thirds of the American soldiers were killed, including First Lieutenant John R. Fox who was posthumously awarded a Medal of Honor in 1997 for his role in the conflict.

The 366th also took part in the unsuccessful offensive attempt of the 92nd to cross the Cinquale Canal and attack German forces Sinquale (sp?) canal; tried to cross the canal in the face of overwhelming German artillery, suffered lots of casualties in two days.

The campaign in Northern Italy left the 366th with 1,300 casualties.

In the war overall, they saw 2997 casualties and 56 prisoners of war.[7]

== After the war ==
The 366th was the only unit of the 92nd that was stripped of its infantry status. When the soldiers returned to the United States, they were made to sit in the rear of the transport buses behind the German prisoners of war, who rode in the front.

Information about individual soldiers from the 366th, such as names and photos, is scarce. No list for this regiment exists, and many soldiers' names are not included on memorials of soldiers killed in World War II.

The 366th Infantry Regiment was disbanded in March 1945, and the soldiers were transferred to "engineering service regiments".

== The Black Guards of Maine ==
The 366th was one of the few battalions armed, trained and ready to defend sensitive facilities and infrastructure throughout New England. Remembering the 1915 Vanceboro international bridge bombing and fearful of further attempts by the Germans to sabotage infrastructure in the United States, the Army sent platoons from the 366th to guard airfields, railroad bridges, water systems, and other key spots in Maine beginning in 1941. Based out of Camp Keyes in Augusta, many soldiers slept in boxcars near their assigned posts, which included locations in the towns of North Yarmouth, Old Town, Morkill, and Monson.

The "Black Guards of Maine," as the soldiers became known, were met with widely varied reactions as they were introduced to communities around the state. In Falmouth, where they guarded the Presumpscot River Bridge, the soldiers joined a local baseball team and led them to the league championship. From their boxcar barracks in Yarmouth, soldiers made friends with local families and participated in dances and bean suppers. In Morkill, soldiers were stationed to guard the Onawa Trestle railroad bridge in 12-hour shifts around the clock, at one point discovering dynamite left below it, possibly by local loggers. While in Morkill, the soldiers held a performance for the local community. In Old Town, however, the owner of the Penobscot Times used both the newspaper and his relationship with Ku Klux Klan-affiliated former governor and current United States senator Ralph Brewster to attempt to have the soldiers removed from the town.

The soldiers of the 366th left Maine between 1942 and 1945 and the Army National Guard and other Army units were sent to replace them. The 366th returned to Fort Devins to continue their training.

== Notable veterans ==
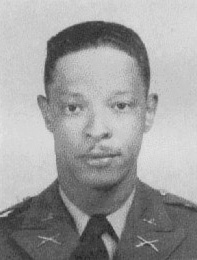
John R. Fox, Medal of Honor recipient

- West A. Hamilton
- Edward W. Brooke III
- Frederic E. Davison
- William L. Dawson
- Aaron R. Fisher
- John R. Fox
- James F. Hamlet
- William Phelps, career Army, financial officer for Morgan State University and then Johns Hopkins University
- Wade H. McCree
- Fredrick Ellis, Army general
- John Letts, Michigan judge
- Samuel Wilbert Tucker
- Ralph Boyd, civil rights activist
- Harold Russell, postal administrator and Director of Disaster Services for Nassau County, New York Red Cross
- Rothacker Smith, prisoner of war
- Edward Peaks, journalist and civil rights activist
- Hyman Chase, zoologist and professor
- James D. Fowler, West Point 1941, retired as the ranking African American Army Colonel

== See also ==
- Military history of African Americans
- Winter Line
- United States Colored Troops
