= 92nd Infantry Division (United States) =

92nd Division 92nd Infantry Division (Colored)
- Shoulder sleeve insignia
- Active: 24 October 1917–February 1919 (National Army); 15 October 1942–28 November 1945 (Organized Reserves)
- Country: United States
- Branch: United States Army
- Type: Infantry
- Size: Division
- Nickname: "Buffalo Soldiers"
- Mottos: "Deeds, not Words"
- Engagements: World War I; Meuse-Argonne; Lorraine 1918; World War II; North Apennines; Po Valley
- Decorations: Italian Croce al Merito di Guerra Italian War Cross of Military Valor

Commanders
- Notable commanders: Maj. Gen. Edward M. Almond; Maj. Gen. James W. Anderson

Insignia
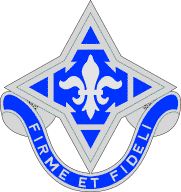
- Distinctive unit insignia

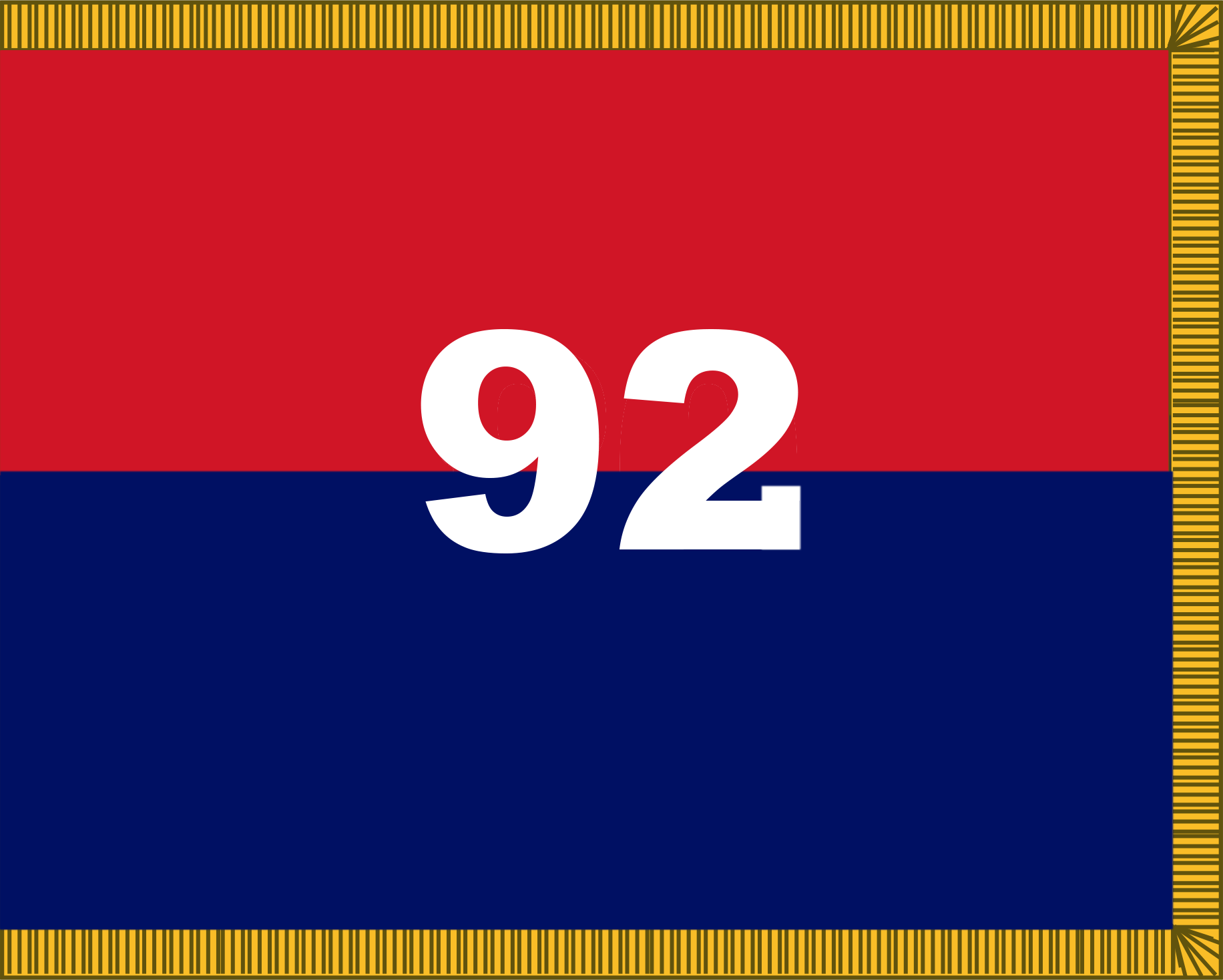
- 92nd Infantry Division Flag

The 92nd Infantry Division (known as the 92nd Division during World War I) was an African American, later mixed, infantry division of the United States Army that served in World War I, and World War II. The military was racially segregated during the World Wars. The division was organized in October 1917, after the U.S. entry into World War I, at Camp Funston, Kansas, with African American soldiers from all states. In 1918, before leaving for France, the American buffalo was selected as the divisional insignia due to the "Buffalo Soldiers" nickname, given to African American cavalrymen in the 19th century. The divisional nickname, "Buffalo Soldiers Division", was inherited from the 366th Infantry, one of the first units organized in the division.

The 92nd Infantry Division was the only African American infantry division that participated in combat in Europe during World War II. Other units were used as support and the 93rd Division fought in the Pacific Theater. The 92nd Infantry Division was a part of the U.S. Fifth Army, fighting in the Italian Campaign from 1944 to the war's end.

== History ==
=== World War I ===
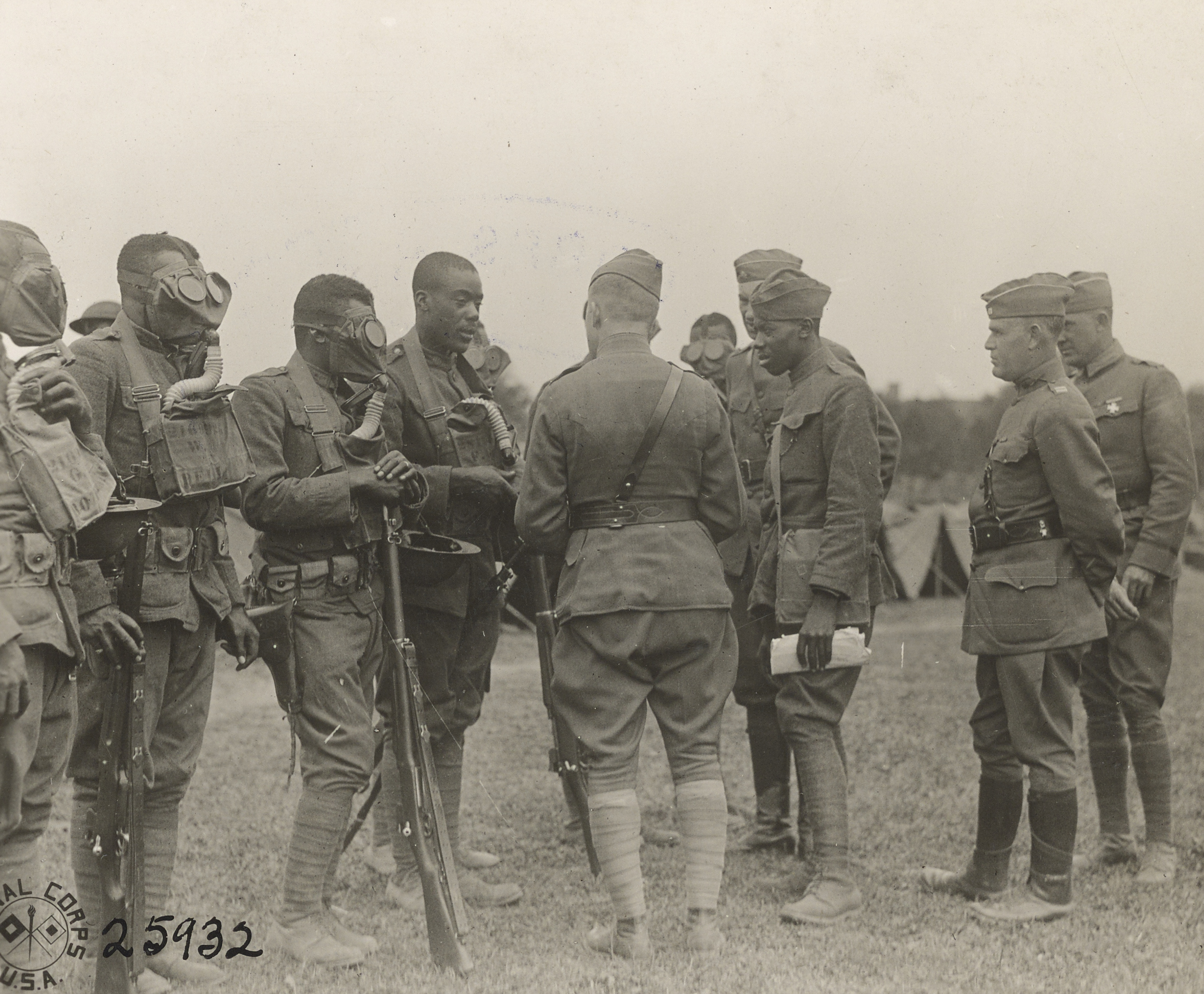
African American doughboys of the 366th Infantry Regiment, 92nd Division, inspecting their gas masks behind the front line, Ainvelle, Vosges, France, August 1918.

- Activated: 24 October 1917
- Overseas: 18 July 1918
- Major operations: Meuse-Argonne less field artillery
- Casualties: total: 1,647 (KIA: 120; WIA: 1,527).
- Commanders: Maj. Gen. Charles C. Ballou (29 October 1917), Maj. Gen. Charles H. Martin (19 November 1918), Brig. Gen. James B. Erwin (16 December 1918).
- Returned to United States and inactivated: February 1919.

The 92nd Division was first constituted on paper on 24 October 1917 in the National Army, over six months after the American entry into World War I. The division was commanded throughout most of its relatively brief existence by Major General Charles C. Ballou and was composed of the 183rd Infantry Brigade with the 365th and 366th Infantry Regiments, and the 184th Infantry Brigade with the 367th and 368th Infantry Regiments, together with supporting artillery, engineer, medical and signal units attached.

The division was organized on 27 October 1917 from draftees (Selective Service men) from the United States at large at eight camps. The War Department did not set up a single cantonment for this unit, and distributed the sub-units of men widely throughout the Midwest and East Coast: at Camp Funston on the grounds of Fort Riley, Kansas; Camp Dodge, Iowa; Camp Grant, Illinois; Camp Sherman, Ohio; Camp Meade, Maryland; Camp Dix, New Jersey; Camp Upton, New York. All of the enlisted personnel and about four-fifths of the officers were African American, but the great majority of the staff and field grade, supply, artillery, engineer, and quartermaster officers were white. For this division, 104 Black captains, 397 first lieutenants, and 125 second lieutenants were trained at a "negro officers' camp" in Des Moines, Iowa.

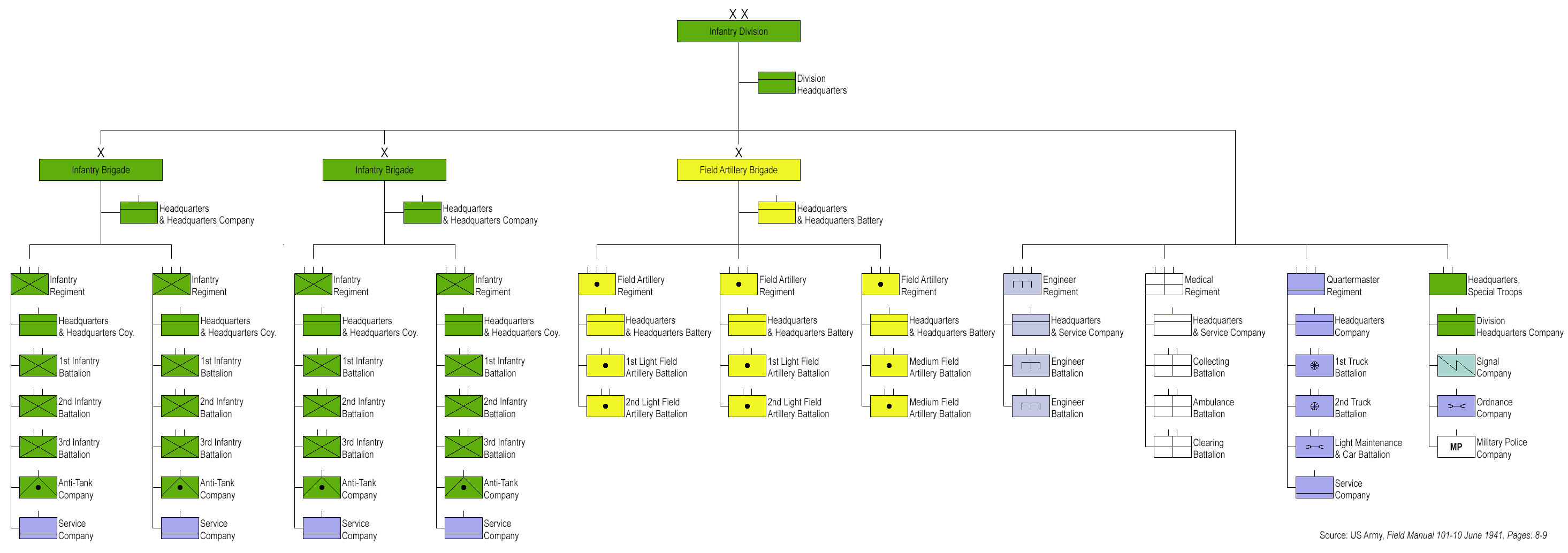
Square division example: 1918 US infantry division. On the far left can be seen two infantry brigades of two infantry regiments each

A special "Negro zone" was to be built at the east end of Camp Funston, with "separate amusement places and exchanges." A.D. Jellison, a banker of Junction City, Kansas, gave a plot of land for a "community house," to be erected by the Black trainees who had been drafted from seven states.

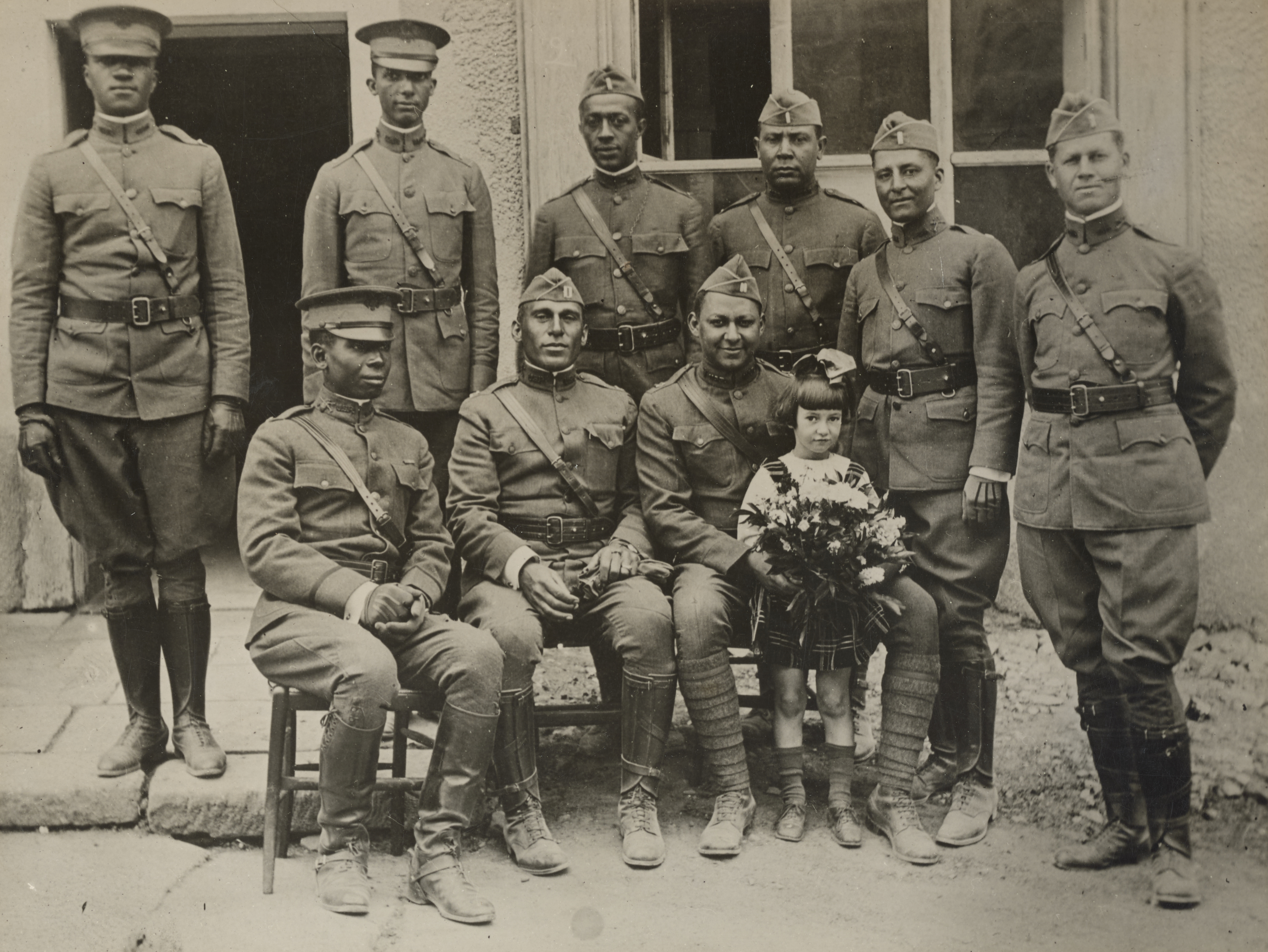
Officers of the 367th Infantry Regiment, 92nd Division, on the Western Front, pictured here in September 1918.

As was the case with the 93rd Division, parts of the 92nd served under and alongside the French Army. The main body of the American Expeditionary Forces (AEF), adhering to the racial policies of Southern President Woodrow Wilson, Secretary of War Newton D. Baker, and southern Democrats, who promoted the "separate but equal" doctrine, refused to allow African American soldiers to serve in combat with white American soldiers.

Arriving on the Western Front, the 92nd was a green and untried unit that was not even given time to maneuver as a division before being committed to the line. After arrival the 92nd, like all AEF units, trained in trench warfare. They began to be introduced by company into the French sector of the front lines in mid-August 1918. The 92nd Artillery Brigade did not come online until October 1918. Ralph Waldo Tyler was assigned to report on the 92nd Division by Secretary Baker. He was the first and, at the time, only accredited African American reporting on the Great War.

The 92nd Division saw combat in the Meuse–Argonne offensive, the largest battle fought by the AEF in the war (and the largest in U.S. military history), during November 1918 and was engaged in fighting right up until the Armistice with Germany on November 11.

==== Order of battle ====
- 92nd Division
  - Headquarters, 92nd Division
  - 183rd Infantry Brigade
    - 365th Infantry Regiment
    - 366th Infantry Regiment
    - 350th Machine Gun Battalion
  - 184th Infantry Brigade
    - 367th Infantry Regiment
    - 368th Infantry Regiment
    - 351st Machine Gun Battalion
  - 167th Field Artillery Brigade
    - 349th Field Artillery Regiment
    - 350th Field Artillery Regiment
    - 351st Field Artillery Regiment
    - 317th Trench Mortar Battery
  - 349th Machine Gun Battalion
  - 317th Engineer Regiment
  - 317th Field Signal Battalion
  - 325th Field Signal Battalion
  - Headquarters Troop, 92nd Division
  - 317th Train Headquarters and Military Police
    - 317th Ammunition Train
    - 317th Supply Train
    - 317th Engineer Train
    - 317th Sanitary Train
      - 365th, 366th, 367th, and 368th Ambulance Companies and Field Hospitals

=== World War II ===
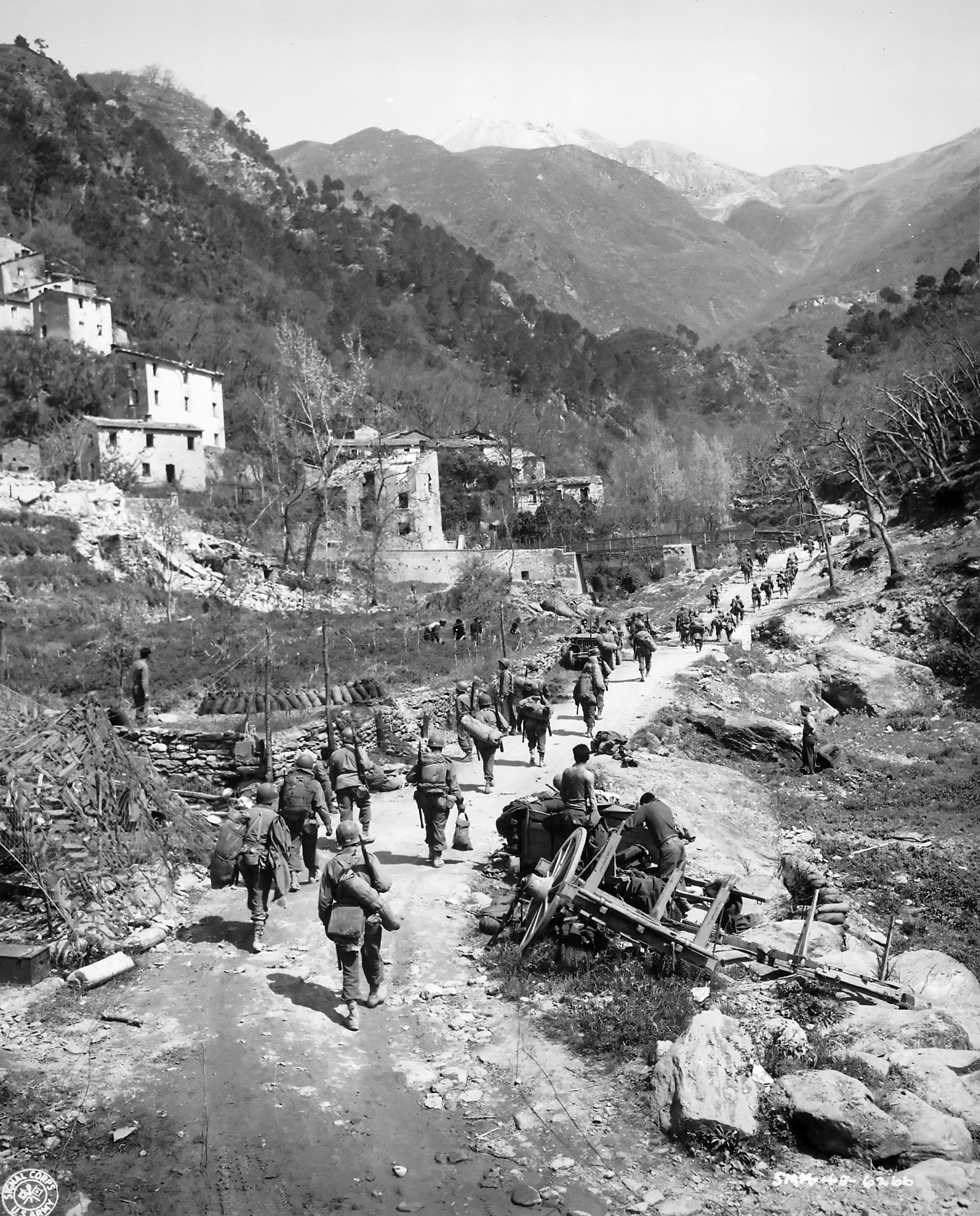
The soldiers of the 92nd Infantry Division enter the city of Montignoso (MS), Italy after having freed it from German troops, 8 April 1945.

- Activated: 15 October 1942.
- Overseas: 22 September 1944.
- Campaigns: North Apennines, Po Valley.
- Awards: Medal of Honor: 2 (1 Posthumously in 1997); Distinguished Service Cross (United States): 2; Army Distinguished Service Medal: 1; Silver Star: 208; Legion of Merit: 16; Soldier's Medal: 6; Bronze Star: 1,166; Purple Heart: 1,891; Order of the Crown of Italy: 8; Military Cross for Military Valor (Italian): 17; Military Cross for Merit in War (Italian): 22; War Medal (Brazil): 1
- Commanders: Maj. Gen. Edward Almond (October 1942 – August 1945), Brig. Gen. John E. Wood (August 1945 to inactivation).
- Returned to the United States: 26 November 1945.
- Inactivated: 28 November 1945.

==== Formation ====
The division was reactivated in the Army of the United States as an infantry division with the "colored" designation, under the command of Major General Edward Almond, on 15 October 1942, ten months after the American entry into World War II. They were assigned to Fort Huachuca, Arizona and trained in the United States for nearly two years. In late July 1944, the 370th Infantry Regiment was sent to Italy and temporarily attached to the 1st Armored Division. The rest of the division was sent overseas in September of that year, and the division as a whole participated in heavy combat during the remainder of the Italian Campaign.

During the 92nd Division's participation in the Italian Front, the Buffalo Soldiers made contact with units of many nationalities: beyond the attached 442nd Regimental Combat Team (442nd RCT), they also had contact with the colonial troops of the British and French colonial empires (Moroccans, Algerians, Senegalese, Indians, Gurkhas, and both Arab and Jewish Palestinians) as well as with exiled Poles, Greeks and Czechs, anti-fascist Italians and the troops of the Brazilian Expeditionary Force (FEB).

The division's magazine was The Buffalo. Its art director, Ted Shearer, later created the early African American comic strip Quincy.

==== Division organization ====
The 92nd Infantry Division consisted of the following units.

92nd Infantry Division organization (click to enlarge)

- 92nd Infantry Division
  - 92nd Infantry Division Headquarters
  - 92nd Cavalry Reconnaissance Troop (Mechanized) (M3 scout cars and then M8 Greyhound armored cars)
  - 365th Infantry Regiment
    - Headquarters and Headquarters Company
    - 3× Infantry battalions
      - each battalion consists of: 1× Headquarters and Headquarters Company, 3× Rifle companies, 1× Heavy Weapons Company
    - Cannon Company (T12 Gun Motor Carriages and T19 Howitzer Motor Carriages, later replaced by either M3 105mm towed howitzers or M7 Priest self propelled howitzers)
    - Anti-Tank Company (M3 37mm anti-tank guns, which were replaced by 1944 with M1 57mm anti-tank guns)
    - Service Company
  - 370th Infantry Regiment
    - same organization as 365th Infantry Regiment
  - 371st Infantry Regiment
    - same organization as 365th Infantry Regiment
  - 92nd Infantry Division Artillery
    - Headquarters and Headquarters Battery
    - 597th Field Artillery Battalion
      - Headquarters and Headquarters Battery
      - 3× Batteries (M2 105mm towed howitzers)
      - Service Battery
    - 598th Field Artillery Battalion
      - same organization as 597th Field Artillery Battalion
    - 599th Field Artillery Battalion
      - same organization as 597th Field Artillery Battalion
    - 600th Field Artillery Battalion
      - Headquarters and Headquarters Battery
      - 3× Batteries (M1 155mm towed howitzers)
      - Service Battery
  - Headquarters Special Troops
    - Headquarters Company, 92nd Infantry Division
    - 92nd Signal Company
    - 92nd Quartermaster Company
    - 792nd Ordnance Light Maintenance Company
    - Military Police Platoon
    - 92nd Infantry Division Band (attached)
  - 317th Engineer Combat Battalion
    - Headquarters and Headquarters and Service Company
    - 3× Engineer combat companies
  - 317th Medical Battalion
    - Headquarters and Headquarters Detachment
    - 3× Collecting companies
    - Clearing Company

Attached units:

- 366th Infantry Regiment (November 1944 – February 1945)
- 442nd Infantry Regiment (Nisei) (April 1945 – )
- 473rd Regimental Combat Team (formed from anti-aircraft units) (February 1945 – May 1945?).
- 758th Tank Battalion (Colored)
- 679th Tank Destroyer Battalion (Colored)
- 894th Tank Destroyer Battalion
- 701st Tank Destroyer Battalion

Task Force 1 (February 1945):

- 3rd Battalion / 366th Infantry Regiment
- Company B, 317th Engineer Battalion
- 760th Tank Battalion
- 84th Chemical Mortar Battalion
- 27th Armored Field Artillery Battalion

==== Commanders ====
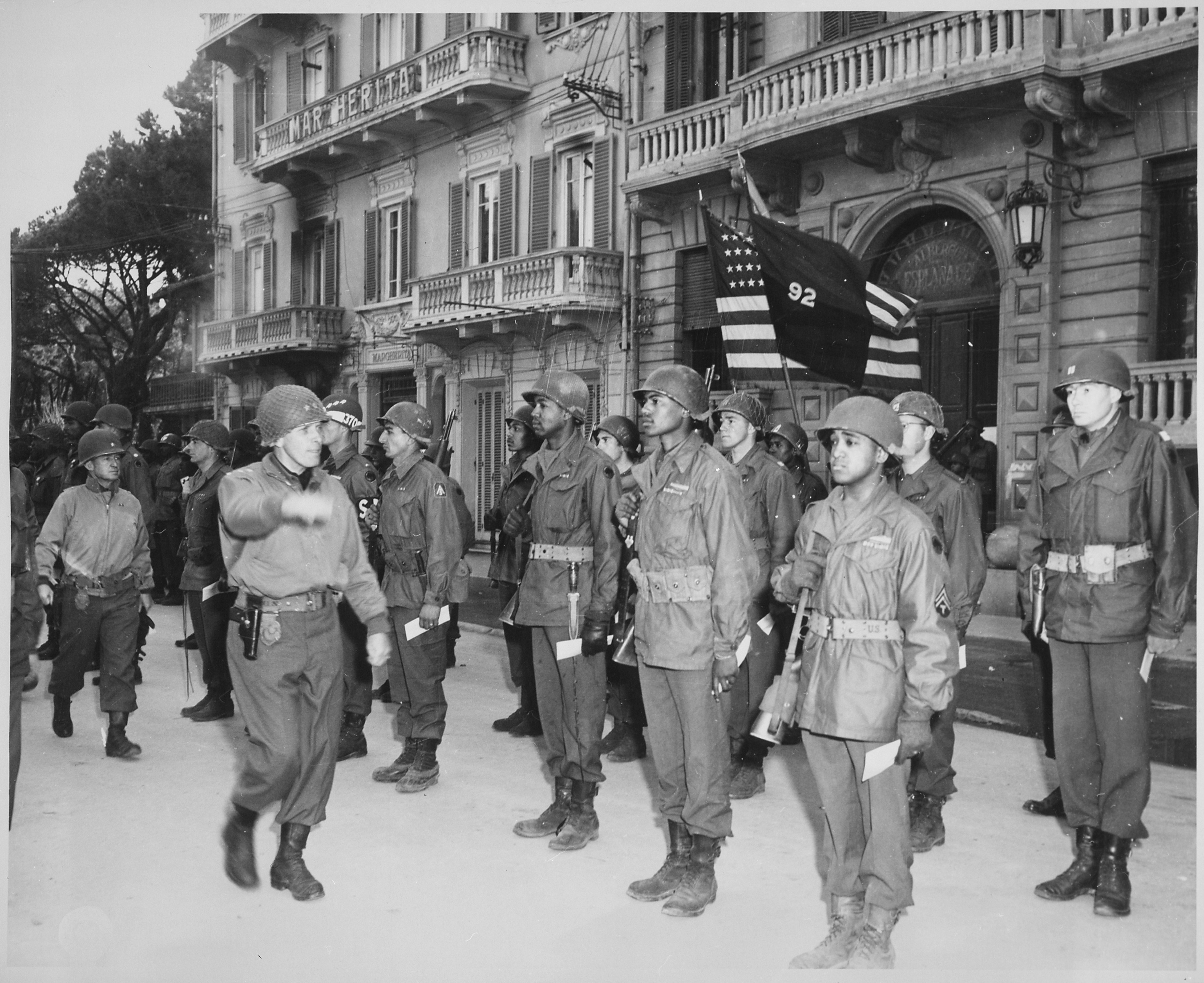
Major General Edward Almond, Commanding General of the 92nd Infantry Division, inspects his troops during a decoration ceremony, March 1945.

The division's commander, Major General Edward Almond, a native Virginian, was for a time highly regarded by General George C. Marshall, the U.S. Army Chief of Staff. They were both graduates of Virginia Military Institute (VMI). This was a major factor in Almond's promotion to major general and subsequent command of the 92nd Division, which was composed of African American draftees in the segregated Army. Almond held this position from the division's formation in October 1942 until August 1945. He led the division in combat throughout the Italian campaign of 1944–1945. Marshall selected Almond because he believed the latter would excel at what was seen as a difficult assignment. But Almond performed poorly and blamed this on his largely African American troops. Blaming them for his failure in combat, he advised the army against using African American soldiers as combat troops.

==== Combat chronicle ====
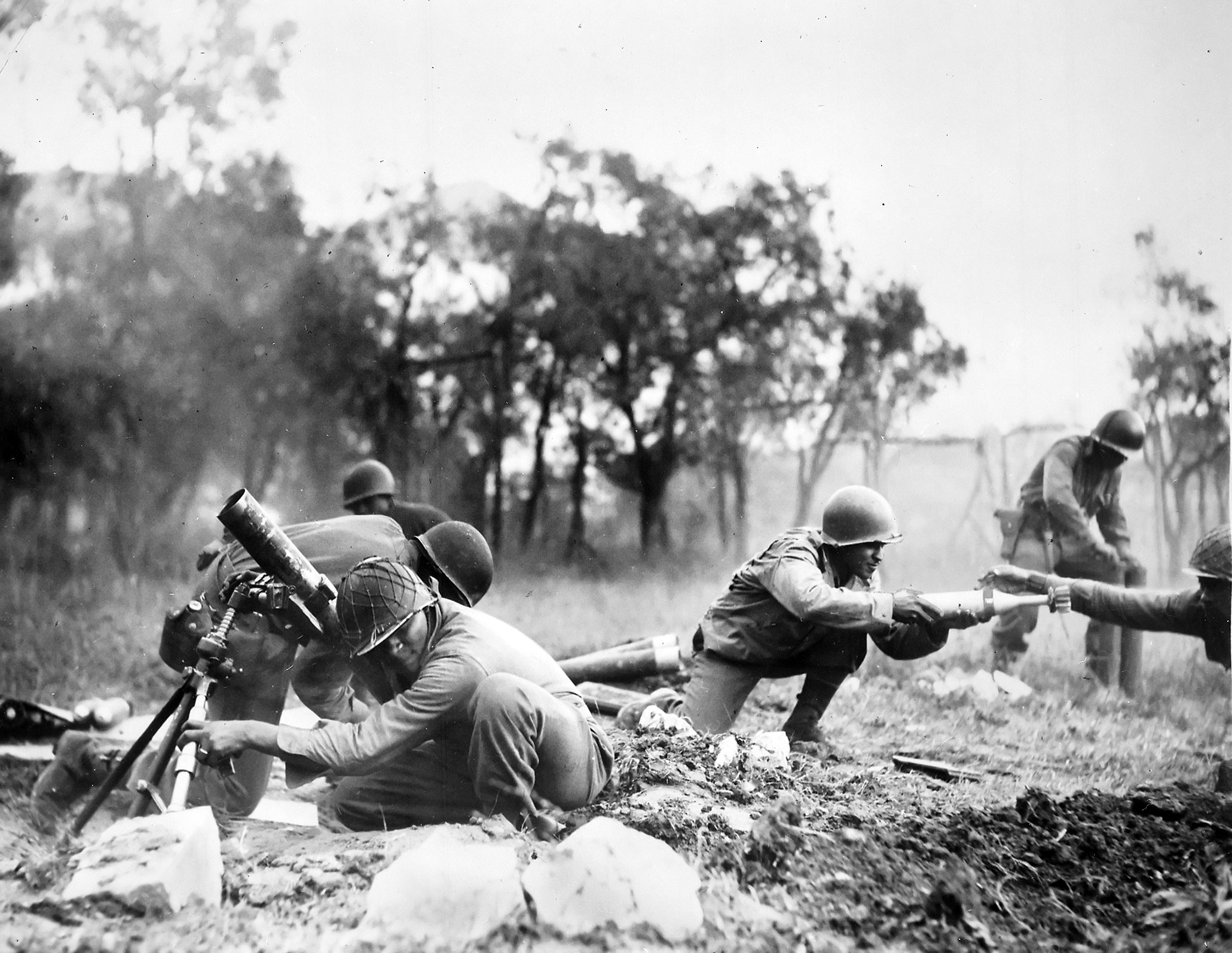
Soldiers of the 92nd Infantry Division operate a mortar, Massa, Italy in November 1944.

The 370th Regimental Combat Team, attached to the 1st Armored Division, arrived in Naples, Italy, on 1 August 1944, and entered combat on 24 August. It participated in the crossing of the Arno River, the occupation of Lucca, and the penetration of the Gothic Line. Enemy resistance was negligible in its area. As Task Force 92, elements of the 92nd attacked on the Ligurian coastal flank toward Massa, 5 October. By 12 October, the slight gains achieved were lost to counterattacks. On 13 October, the remainder of the division concentrated for patrol activities.

Elements of the 92nd moved to the Serchio sector, 3 November 1944, and advanced in the Serchio River Valley against light resistance, but the attempt to capture Castelnuovo di Garfagnana did not succeed. Patrol activities continued until 26 December when the enemy attacked, forcing units of the 92nd to withdraw. The attack ended on 28 December. The attacking forces were mainly from the Republic of Salò's Fascist Army, the 4th Italian "Monte Rosa" Alpine Division (four battalions), with the support of three German battalions.

Aside from patrols and reconnaissance, units of the 92nd attacked enemy forces in the Serchio sector from 8 to 11 February 1945. Operation Fourth Term met German minefields and counterattacks and was called off on 11 February due to disappointing results. After continuing poor combat performance, including many instances of unauthorized withdrawals upon meeting the enemy, low morale and malingering, the U.S. command concluded that the 92nd Infantry Division was of inferior quality and fit for only defensive roles; according to a 1966 study by historian Ulysses G. Lee, captured German documents revealed their command also had a low opinion of the division. Because there were very few African American infantry replacements, this precluded use of the full division in sustained offensive action. In addition, U.S. Fifth Army leadership was wary of the perception of poor performance; they decided to withdraw the division from the front lines and rebuilt it in early 1945.

The 370th Infantry Regiment remained assigned to the division and was rebuilt by transferring outstanding enlisted men and officers from the 365th and 371st. The 473rd Infantry Regiment, formed from unneeded White anti-aircraft troops, and the Nisei 442nd Infantry Regiment, made up of Japanese Americans and becoming noted for its high performance, were assigned to bolster the division's combat effectiveness. The 365th Infantry Regiment became a training and replacement regiment for the division, receiving replacements of African American soldiers from the United States, or African American soldiers who were stationed in the United States or Britain but assigned to labor units and who volunteered for retraining for combat duty. The 371st Infantry Regiment was relieved from assignment to the division and used under Fifth Army control. The 366th Infantry Regiment was relieved from assignment to the division, disbanded, and its personnel organized into two engineer general service regiments.

Some contemporary historians believe that reports of the poor combat performance of the 92nd Infantry Division were motivated by the racism of senior officers and used to discredit the ability of black soldiers to perform in combat to the black public, instead of examining and remedying institutional deficiencies within the Army itself when it came to recruiting, training, and leading black soldiers.

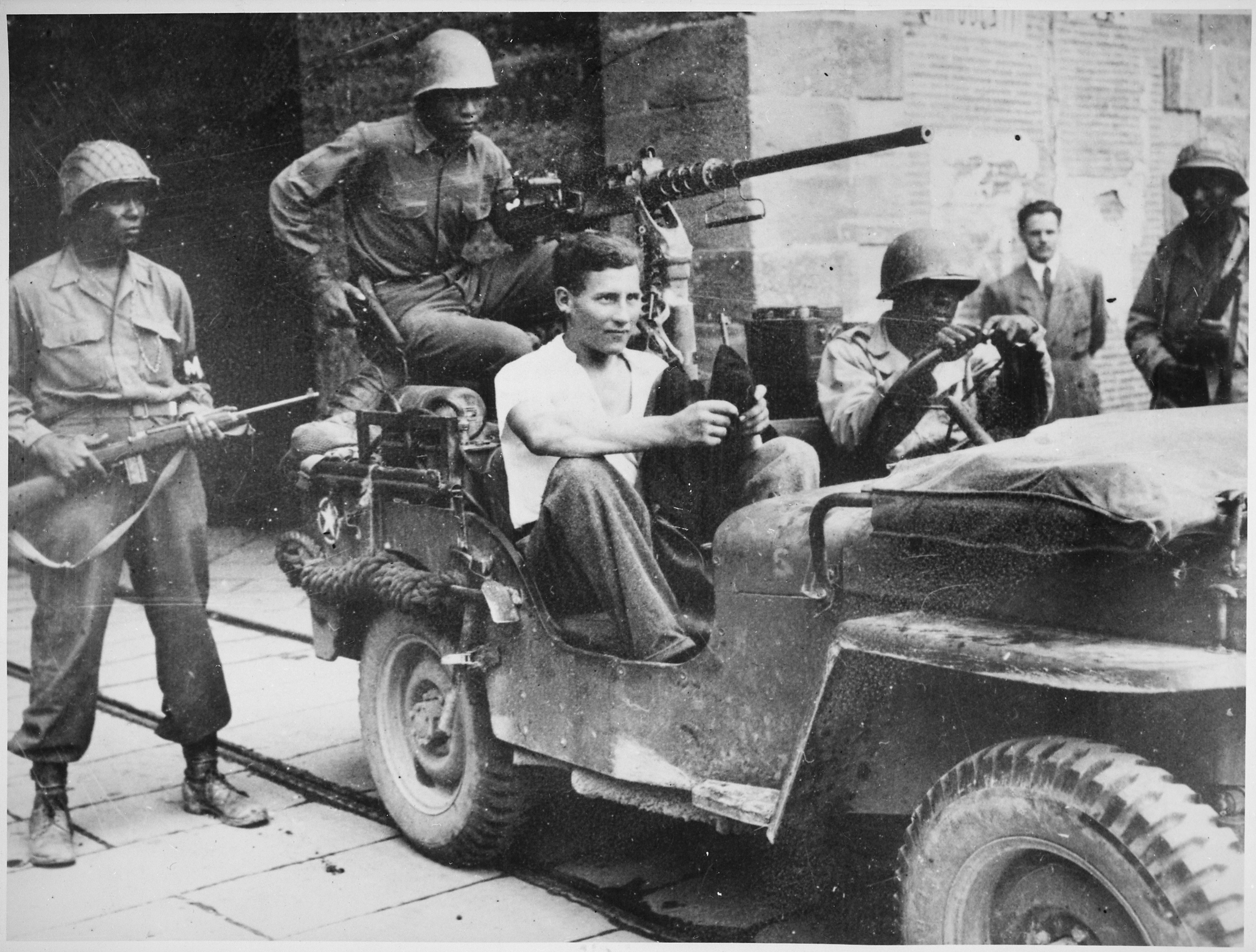
Soldiers of the 92nd Infantry Division with a captured German soldier. Lucca, September 1944

On 1 April, the 370th RCT and the attached 442nd Regimental Combat Team (Nisei) attacked the Ligurian coastal sector and drove rapidly north against light opposition from the German 148th Infantry Division. It was supported only by Italian coastal units. The 370th took over the Serchio sector and pursued the retreating enemy from 18 April until the collapse of all enemy forces on 29 April 1945. Elements of the 92nd Division entered La Spezia and Genoa on 27 April and took over selected towns along the Ligurian coast until the enemy surrendered on 2 May 1945.

The division was inactivated on 28 November 1945 at Fort McClellan, Alabama.

==== Casualties ====
- Total battle casualties: 2,997
- Killed in action: 548
- Wounded in action: 2,187
- Missing in action: 206
- Prisoner of war: 56

==== Medal of Honor recipients ====
- John R. Fox, 1st Lt., Cannon Company, 366th Infantry Regiment, 92nd Infantry Division, near Sommocolonia, Serchio Valley, Italy, 26 December 1944.
- Vernon J. Baker, 1st Lt., Company C, 370th Infantry Regiment, 92nd Infantry Division, near Viareggio, Italy, 5–6 April 1945.

Note: The Medal of Honor was not awarded to these two men until 1997.

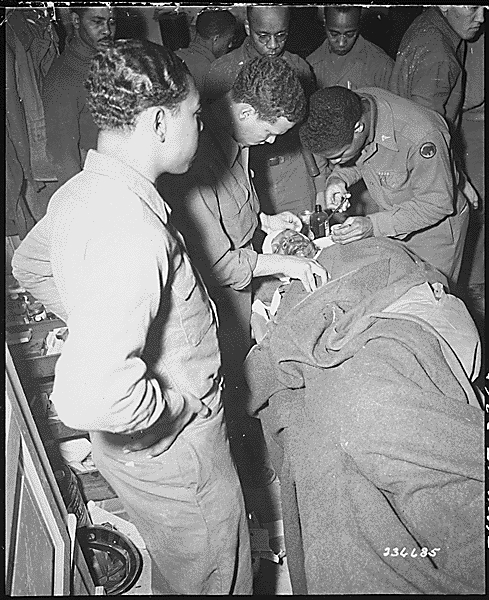
Capt. Ezekia Smith, of the 370th Infantry Regiment, receives treatment at the 317th Medical Battalion Collecting Station, for shell fragments in face and shoulders suffered near Querceta, Italy.

== See also ==
- 24th Infantry Regiment (United States)
- Battle of Garfagnana – 1944 battle in Italy during World War II
- James Harden Daugherty – American writer (1923–2015), soldier and author
- Colonel Allen J. Greer – United States Army officer, chief of staff, World War I
- IV Corps (United States), World Wars I and II
- Miracle at St. Anna – 2008 film by Spike Lee
