= Charles Alexander =

Charles Alexander may refer to:

== Born before 1900 ==
- Charles Alexander, Duke of Württemberg (1684–1737), governor of Kingdom of Serbia, 1720–1733
- Charles Alexander, Grand Duke of Saxe-Weimar-Eisenach (1818–1901), ruler of Saxe-Weimar-Eisenach, 1853–1901
- Charles Alexander, Margrave of Brandenburg-Ansbach (1736–1806)
- Charles Alexander (politician) (1816–1905), merchant and politician in Quebec
- Charles Alexander (cricketer, born 1839) (1839–1917), Indian-born English cricketer
- Charles Alexander (cricketer, born 1847) (1847–1902), English cricketer and barrister
- Charles D. Alexander (1897–1962), American children's writer of short stories and novels
- Charles McCallon Alexander (1867–1920), gospel singer
- Charles Paul Alexander (1889–1981), American entomologist
- Charles A. Alexander (1827–1888), American architect
- Prince Charles Alexander of Lorraine (1712–1780), Austrian military commander
- Charlie Alexander (1890–1970), American jazz pianist

== Born after 1900 ==
- Charles Alexander (defensive tackle) (born 1985), American football player
- Charles Alexander (running back) (born 1957), former professional American football player
- Charles Alexander (poet) (born 1957), American poet, publisher and book artist
- CJ Alexander (Charles Joseph Wesley Alexander, born 1996), American baseball player
- Prince Charles Alexander (born 1958), American record producer, audio engineer and professor of music
