= Bacote =

Bacote is a surname. Notable people with the surname include:

- Clarence Albert Bacote (1906–1981), American historian and activist
- Rufus Herve Bacote (1890–1930), American physician and World War I veteran
