= John Catherwood =

John Catherwood may refer to:

- John Hugh Catherwood (1888–1930), American seaman awarded the Medal of Honor
- John Alexander Catherwood (1857–1940), farmer and politician in British Columbia, Canada

== See also ==
- Catherwood (disambiguation)
