= Rufus Herve Bacote =

American physician (1890–1930)

- Born: July 1, 1890; Timmonsville, South Carolina, US
- Died: October 13, 1930 (aged 40); Earlington, Kentucky, US
- Resting place: Nashville, Tennessee
- Education: Meharry Medical College (1917)
- Occupation: physician
- Title: First lieutenant
- Spouse: Amanda Bacote

Rufus Herve Bacote, M.D. (July 1, 1890 – October 13, 1930) was a physician in Kentucky and Tennessee who served as a first lieutenant and an army doctor in 370th Infantry Regiment of 93rd Division during World War I.

== Early life ==
Bacote was born in Timmonsville, South Carolina, in a town ten miles from Florence. He lived in an area mostly designated for agricultural innovation. He was born to M.T. Bacote and Hattie Jackson of South Carolina. His father had been a farmer. Rufus was the second oldest of four children. In 1917, Bacote graduated from Meharry Medical College, in Nashville, at the age of 27. Bacote registered for the World War I draft in May 1917.

== Military service ==
In 1917, Bacote began military service as a first lieutenant in the Army Reserve Corps and reported to the Fort Des Moines Medical Officers Training camp. After remaining in the camp for 46 days, Bacote transferred first to Camp Fuston, then Camp Logan. He was assigned to the 370th Infantry Regiment of the 93rd Division, which mostly comprised to African-American soldiers of the Old 8th Illinois National Guard. Bacote was commissioned as a first lieutenant and assigned as a medical doctor.

Fearing the threat of race riots coming from Camp Logan, Bacote and his unit were sent to France on the USS President Grant in 1918. General Pershing sent the majority of the African American troops over to the French, who had been requesting American assistance. Bacote fought alongside fellow medical school graduates, such as George Washington Antoine, and Claudius Ballard.

Bacote experienced minimal injuries during the war and had to deal with patients experiencing gassing effects and serious illness from the conditions. In 1918, Bacote was discharged.

== Career ==
Bacote returned to Nashville in the Davidson County with his wife. Later, they moved to Kentucky, where Bacote practiced medicine, after hearing from his medical school that there were shortages of physicians. In 1920, he moved again to Earlington, Kentucky. He remained in Earlington and practiced there until his death in 1930.

== Death ==
In 1930, Bacote died of kidney disease. His body was moved to Nashville and buried.

== Personal life ==
Bacote married Amanda Bacote shortly after his graduation from medical school in 1917. The couple remained childless. After his death, Mrs. Bacote moved to Chicago and was heavily involved in the Pilgrim Baptist Church School there until her death.
