= Claudius Ballard =

American physician

- Born: June 14, 1890; Los Angeles, California
- Died: May 1, 1967 (aged 76); Los Angeles, California
- Resting place: Calvary Cemetery, 4201 Whittier Boulevard, Los Angeles, California, US
- Education: University of Southern California, UC Berkeley – UCSF Joint Medical Program (1913)
- Occupation: physician
- Title: First Lieutenant
- Spouse: May Lee Paine (1921-1967)
- Children: 2

Claudius Ballard, M.D. (June 14, 1890 – May 1, 1967) was a prominent African- American physician situated in Los Angeles, California.

He served in World War I (as a part of the Medical Reserve Corps) in the 370th Infantry. Ballard was the medical officer of the 3rd battalion and was awarded the French Croix de Guerre for his courageous efforts in providing aid for soldiers in the field.

After the war, he became infamous within the Los Angeles community and was frequently mentioned for his efforts in the media, publishing several medical research articles himself.

== Early life ==
Ballard was born on June 14, 1890, to William L Ballard and Mary Ester Tibbs. From his father's side, Ballard was the grandson of John Ballard, born in 1829, a former slave from Kentucky who moved his family to California in the 1850s. After being freed, John Ballard, along with 4000 other African American residents, lived near Santa Monica Mountains. He helped form a stable African-American community at the base of what now is referred to as "Ballard Mountain". It was formerly named by a racial slur by the white in the area and in the late 19th century it was renamed. John Ballard had married twice, first to Amanda Ballard in 1859 with whom he had eight kids. When she died he married Francis Ballard in 1879. The Ballard family as already well known in the Los Angeles community for the efforts of Claudius's grandfather, aunts and uncles, who all purchased a large array of land to set up institutions for the community's use. John was one of the leading people responsible for the formation of the area's first African Methodist Episcopal church. However, despite the legacy of his family, Ballard would rarely mention his grandfather in his adult life.

Raised as a single child, Claudius eventually graduated from Los Angeles High School and went to the University of Southern California for college. After graduating he would follow to attend UC Berkeley – UCSF Joint Medical Program for medical school, which he finished in 1913. After completely his qualification exams, Ballard started a medical practice in Los Angeles at the age of 24. According to the medical and surgical United States Registrar, Ballard was situated in 102 1/2 S Central Avenue in 1913. Later in 1914, Ballard would combine his offices with a friend from medical school and the two gentlemen tried to establish a permanent state medical society in Southern California. Later, that Ballard would begin his publishing career when he released a paper called "The Pituitary, Its Function and Pathology" (April 1915). Before World War I, Ballard was a part of two additional published works, including a medical dialogue called "Official and Unofficial Narcotic Preparations" (September 1915) and a single paper called "Tonsillitis and Its Sequel" (December 1915).

Upon the United States's entrance into World War I, Ballard was one of the physicians who volunteered and in 1917 he was commissioned as First Lieutenant of the Medical Reserve Corps.

== Military service ==
Like many of his peers, Ballard was sent for basic training at Fort Des Moines Provisional Army Officer Training School. He was given the rank of First Lieutenant. Fort Des Moines had been opened for training African-American men as there had been a huge influx of African-American volunteers and a petition was erected by the students of Howard University. However, there was still some discontent at the facility as many soldiers found that he had been unfairly assessed for merely being black. After his training First Lieutenant Ballard was assigned to the 370th Infantry which had formally been 8th Illinois National Guard. Other individuals who'd been a part of the unit were George Washington Antoine, and Rufus Bacote, who were also physicians. Ballard was designated as a Surgeon along with the other lieutenants.

Ballard was one of the first African American doctors who arrived at the French lines when sent over in November 1918. He was also accompanied by two dentists of the 370th Infantry, including Lieutenants Roe and Tancil. It was full medical unit who was sent in first. At the time the Medical Detachment was divided in several sections. Ballard was in charge of the Third Battalion. The tasks of these battalions was similar. The French had been facing heavy attack from the German forces at the time, so many of the medical officers would be sent out into the field. The physician and his aids would go into the hail of battle out in the open and render first aid to both severe and mild injuries. The first thing that Ballard and his fellow officers would do was administer an anti-tetanic serum to ensure that the patient would prevent getting tetanus and gas baecilus, as part of procedure. Ballard reached profound acknowledgement for his bravery and undeterred perseverance. In the effort, Ballard had been injured, but still he had refused to be treated or evacuated. Instead, Ballard continued to perform his duty and tend to the wounded. As a result of his efforts, in November 1918, Ballard was awarded the French Croix de Guerre at Mont des Singes at the backs of Ailette River. The French record of the event was stated as follows:

            "General Rondeau, commanding the Infantry of the 59th Division, cites this Brigade Order. Lieut. Dr. Claudius Ballard of the 370th Regimental Infantry, U.S.  During the operations of September 30 to October 18, 1918, he remained posted, although wounded, and administered aid to his comrades with an extraordinary devotion until his Battalion was relieved. 
                                                          General Rondeau, Commander of the 59TH Infantry Division"[12]

At the end of the war, Ballard was honorably discharged on February 21, 1919, and Ballard moved back in with his father in Los Angeles.

== Career ==
When Ballard returned to Los Angeles he became prominent for his efforts and was frequently seen in various newspaper articles, including one shortly after his return in the California Eagle titled, "After Its Victories", discussing his role in the war.

He continued work in his practice, keeping it away from his family's home. It was during the following decades that California was facing a large wave of migration which needed a large amount of innovation as a result. Ballard's practice grew so much that in the late 1930s he was credited for his efforts. In the 1920s he served as the Secretary of Physicians, Dentists and Druggists Association of South Carolina and continued writing articles for it.

At the break of World War II, Dr. Ballard returned to teach first aid at local high schools as there was a mounting fear of attack from foreign powers. Dr. Ballard was well known in the medical community for his intensive research and action whenever there was a threat of disease. He became a member of the Sigma Pi Phi and was a founder of the local Xi boule. He was also prominently active in the National Medical Association, NAACP, YWCP, YWCA, and the Catholic Church, as they ran a large number of relief charities.

In a 1940 Census, Ballard, aged 50, was listed as living with his sons, one 19 years old and the other, 15 years old, at the address 1483 1/2 W 36th Place, Los Angeles, California.

== Death ==
Ballard died in May 1967 and was buried in Los Angeles. Dr. Ballard was buried in a Roman Catholic Cemetery called Calvary Cemetery in East Los Angeles. On his gravestone it states "Awarded the Croix de Guerre medal in World War I. The medal recognized acts of bravery in the face of the enemy."

== Personal life ==
On March 5, 1921, Ballard married Miss May Lee Paine. She was from Rome, Georgia. Together they had two sons: Albert Lucky born on March 5, 1921, and Reginald born on November 21, 1924. Sometime before his death, Ballard and his wife separated and she survived him.

Albert grew to become an engineer and died in 2011. His second son became prominent in the Los Angeles community as the captain of the Los Angeles Fire Department, which he retired from in 1978, and successful real estate owner. He was one of the leading family members who helped rename "Ballard Mountain". Reginald had six children, including Ryan Ballard, an educator.
