= James Blue (politician) =

American politician

James Blue was an American politician from Glynn County, Georgia who served in the Georgia House of Representatives from 1871 until 1877.

In 1868 he swore to a statement about voting site issues. He was a critic of the convict lease system. Based on sources including Clarence A. Bacote's "The Negro in Georgia Politics, 1880-1908, an unpublished dissertation, Eric Foner documented Blue as being an African-American laborer who was illiterate.
