= Eighth Regiment Armory (Chicago) =

School, former armory in Chicago, Illinois

- U.S. National Register of Historic Places
- Chicago Landmark
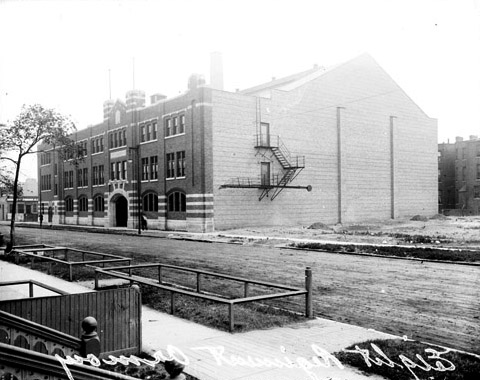

- Location within Chicago metropolitan area Location within Illinois Location within the United States
- Location: 3533 South Giles Avenue, Chicago, Illinois
- Coordinates: 41°49′50.47″N 87°37′9.64″W
- Built: 1914
- Architect: J.B. Dibelka
- MPS: Black Metropolis TR
- NRHP reference No.: 86001096

Significant dates
- Added to NRHP: April 30, 1986
- Designated CHICL: September 9, 1998

The Eighth Regiment Armory, located in the Black Metropolis-Bronzeville District of Chicago, Illinois, was the first armory in the United States built for an African-American military regiment, known as the "Fighting 8th". The building later was used by a division of the Illinois National Guard, and during World War I was incorporated into the US Infantry. After closing the armory in the early 1960s, it became the South Central Gymnasium. In 1999, following an extensive renovation, it was reopened as a public high school military academy. The restoration and conversion into a school has been recognized by the National Trust for Historic Preservation.

The nearby Victory Monument honors the regiment for service during World War I.

The armory was listed on the National Register of Historic Places on April 30, 1986, and was designated as a Chicago Landmark on September 9, 1998. It is one of nine landmark structures in the Black Metropolis-Bronzeville District. In currently houses the Chicago Military Academy.

== In popular culture ==
On June 27, 1937, the armory hosted a battle of the bands, featuring big bands. The Roy Eldridge's band began the show, followed by the 16 piece Benny Goodman band, with Gene Krupa on the drums and Harry James on the trumpet. The popular tune King Porter Stomp was a highlight of the evening.

== See also ==
- Chicago architecture
- Chicago Landmark
- 370th Infantry Regiment (United States)
