= George St. Pierre Brooks =

American-born storyteller

George St. Pierre Brooks (c. 1844 – May 6, 1948), also known as George Semperius Brooks, was an American-born storyteller, and a local personality in Winnipeg, Canada. Brooks was Black and born enslaved. He worked served in the military in both the United States and Canada as a minstrel performer and singer.

== Early life and Civil War ==
George St. Pierre Brooks was born enslaved c. 1844 in Kentucky. When he was a teen, he was forced serve with the Confederacy during the American Civil War, until he was captured. He switched sides, and fought for the Union Army.

== Career ==
He performed with P. T. Barnum prior to Barnum's circus. He sang with the Fisk Jubilee Singers, an African-American a cappella ensemble, and together they toured internationally.

Brooks worked with the 10th U.S. Cavalry as a cook for five years. During the Spanish–American War, Brooks served for six months in the 370th Infantry Regiment (A Company, 8th Illinois Battalion).

Brooks emigrated to Canada in 1900. On his Canadian military records he used the name "George Semperius Brooks" and his date of birth was listed as 1876, in Havana, Cuba. He served in World War I for Great Britain in Canada, and was ranked a private in the Army.

He died on May 6, 1948, at Deer Lodge Hospital in Winnipeg, and is buried at Brookside Cemetery in Winnipeg.

He had syphilis and was hospitalized. He was photographed.
