= Otis Duncan =

Otis Duncan may refer to:

- Otis B. Duncan, commander of a battalion of the 370th Infantry Regiment during World War One
- Otis D. Duncan, sociologist
