= James Alexander Owen =

American medical doctor and politician

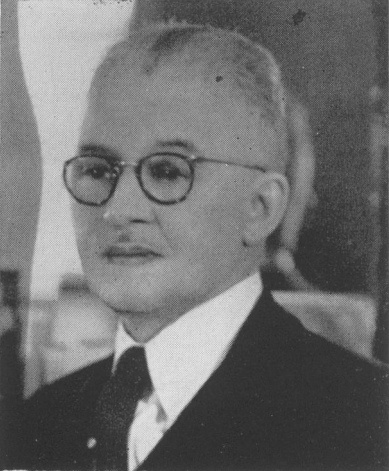
- Born: September 6, 1891; Natchez, Mississippi, U.S.
- Died: July 6, 1955 (aged 63); Detroit, Ohio, U.S.
- Education: Natchez Junior College (1912); Meharry Medical College (1916)
- Occupation: physician
- Employer(s): Old General Hospital No. 2 Parkside Hospital (1940–1955); Wayne Diagnostic Hospital (1940–1955); Wilberforce University (1939–1955)
- Title: Captain
- Political party: Democratic Party

James Alexander Owen (September 6, 1891 – July 6, 1955) was an American medical doctor and politician from Mississippi who was also active in Cleveland and Detroit, Ohio. Owen was a member of the board of trustees for the National Medical Association and was frequently credited for his efforts in the Journal of the National Medical Association.

Owen served in World War I (as a part of the Medical Reserve Corps) in the 370th Infantry. Owen was the medical officer of the 366th Field Hospital in France and was charged to study the effects of radiology there. He eventually was ranked captain before being discharged.

== Early life ==
Owen was born on September 6, 1891, in Natchez, Mississippi into a Black family, to parents Samuel Henry Clay Owen and Sarah Josephine Mazique. James had a twin named Henry, and three younger brothers as well. His father Samuel Owen was a teacher, and later became the president of Natchez Junior College (also known as Natchez College). Owen's mother was a matron of the college. The school had been founded in 1885 in an effort to educate African American Baptists. By the early 1900s, Natchez Junior College was one of the few local private institutions of higher learning that contributed significantly to the education of African Americans.

Owen and his brothers were part of a small community of highly educated African Americans in Mississippi. His parents made sure their sons never stopped learning and prospering from their educational resources. After graduating from public school, Owen and all his brothers eventually attended Natchez College. Owen graduated in 1912 and moved to Nashville to attend Meharry Medical College, form which he graduated in 1916. When he finished school, the Owen went to intern in Old General Hospital No. 7 in Kansas City.

== Military service ==
In 1917, the United States joined World War I and the entire nation was in a buzz to join the effort. After the declaration of war with Germany, many African-Americans were turned away from the local recruiting stations. Unprepared for a large scale conflict, the United States Army had only four black regiments, and many commanders would not allow mixing of blacks and whites in their units. Also, the black regiments themselves were not trusted to be sent to Europe, as many of the higher ups possessed a lack of confidence in black soldiers as fighters. Fort Des Moines Provisional Army Officer Training School had been opened for training African-American men as there had been a huge influx of African-American volunteers and a petition was erected by the students of Howard University. However, there was still some discontent at the facility as many soldiers found that he had been unfairly assessed for merely being black.

When Owen answered the military's call for physicians he was immediately given the rank First Lieutenant in the Army Medical Reserve Corps. Like all the African-American recruits, Owen was sent to Fort Des Moines for medical training at the Medical Officers Training Camp. As part of the United States effort to expand the military, the War Department had issued Order No. 75 which had established the U.S. Army Ambulance Service (USAAS) and the Sanitary Corps. The goal was to allow the Medical Department to commission individuals in specialities if need be. After completing his training, Owen was assigned as a medical officer with the 317th Sanitary Train of the 92nd Division and was sent to Camp Funston, Kansas.

When the 92nd Division landed in France, Owen was reassigned to the 366th Field Hospital. The 92nd Division had been assigned to the trenches to assist the French troops there who had been facing aggressive assaults from the Germans for months. Owen spent a large amount of his time treating soldiers for illnesses, such as the Influenza, and gas inhalation. Most African-American soldiers had been assigned to noncombatant engineer units that performed dangerous and hard jobs of digging trenches, forming roads, and fortification against the Germans. Owen spent his time in France busy taking care of sick men and those heavily injured from building, as the Germans were becoming more aggressive in late 1918. A tactic the Germans would use in the trenches was to throw constant gassing shells at the Allied troops causing the hospitals to be filled which troops suffering from lung and breath problems. Before the war ended, Owen was promoted to captain.

Owen was honorably discharged in 1919 and was credited in the Meharry Annual report for his efficient work.

== Career ==
Owen returned to Mississippi after his service in the war and lived there until 1920 when he moved to a small town in Oklahoma. He met his wife there and soon moved to Cleveland, Ohio, to seek employment. He remained there for eight years and opened his own medical practice. The years spent in Cleveland were anything but quiet. Owen became a member of the Cleveland Medical, Dental, and Pharmaceutical Association and a lifelong member of the National Medical Association.

In 1925, Owen and other medical doctors in the area founded the Cleveland Medical Reading Club to keep African-American Medical professionals updated on programs and treatments. Many African American professionals were excluded from traditional Euro-American medical associations so Owen decided there needed to be an organization founded to keep the public, "abreast of programs and advancements in the medical field" and did not believe that that should be designated for whites only.

Owen entered the political sphere in 1932 when he became a member of the executive committee of the Cuyahoga county Democratic Party and served there until 1940. He also ran an unsuccessful campaign for Thomas W. Felming's seat (third district) in the Cleveland City Council. Owen's platform was to provide better sanitation and increased access to medical care for the community. Owen later became assistant ward leader of Cleveland's 18th ward and a charter member of the Conservative Republican Voters League.

Life in Cleveland grew to become more taxing as in 1933, Owen's office was intruded by two individuals seeking to rob him. Owen had surprised them both by producing his pistol, which he had kept hidden in his desk, and chased them down. The incident was reported in the Pittsburgh Courier.

In 1940, the Owen and wife moved to Detroit where his younger twin lived and was given employment at Parkside Hospital and Wayne Diagnostic Hospital. Owen also managed his own private practice with his brother. In Detroit he repeated his close relationship with the National Medical Association, eventually becoming a trustee in the board.

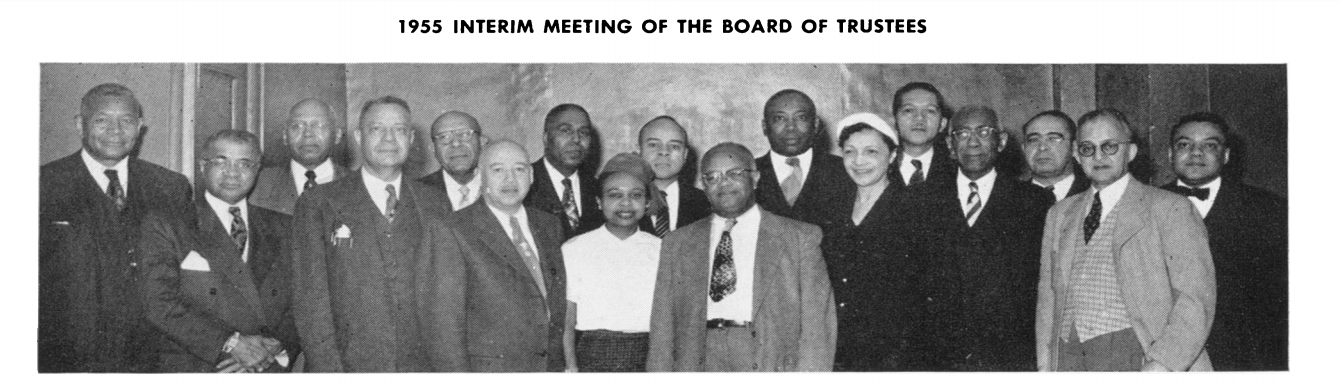
Group Photograph of the Detroit Board of Trustees in National Medical Association, Owen (far left second to last individual)

Owen also served as president of the board of trustees of the combined normal and industrial department in Wilberforce University from 1939 to his death, and as vice-president of the Ohio Medical Association. He was also a lifelong member of the American Legion and Kappa Alpha Ps Fraternity.

In 1954, the Journal of the National Medical Association reported Owen and his wife traveling to Europe for the International Congress of Obstetrics and Gynecology at Geneva, Switzerland.

== Personal life ==
Shortly after leaving the military, Owen married Marie E. Thomas, a teacher from Tuskegee, Alabama. The couple did not have any children and Mrs. Owen survived him.

== Death ==
Owen died in July 1955 and was survived by his wife and younger brother. His death was mentioned in the Journal of the National Medical Association and was mourned for his many contributions to the medical community.
