= Catherwood =

Catherwood is a name. Notable people with the name include:

== People with this surname ==
- Andrea Catherwood (born 1967), Northern Ireland news presenter
- Christopher Catherwood (contemporary), British author
- David Catherwood (born 1956), Irish composer and orchestra conductor
- Earl Catherwood (1900–1988), Canadian politician (in Ontario)
- Emma Catherwood (born 1981), Welsh actress
- Ethel Catherwood (1908–87), Canadian Olympic track and field athlete
- Sir Fred Catherwood (1925–2014), British politician; member of the European Parliament 1974–94
- Frederick Catherwood (1799–1854), English artist and architect
- John Alexander Catherwood (1857–1940), Canadian politician (in British Columbia)
- John Hugh Catherwood (1888–1930), U.S. Navy seaman
- Mary Hartwell Catherwood (1847–1902), American author
- Michael Catherwood (born 1979), American radio personality
- Sarah Catherwood (born 1980), Olympic swimmer from New Zealand

== People with this given name ==
- Catherwood Learmonth (1896-1981), British legal administrator

== See also ==
- Martin P. Catherwood Library
- Jay Catherwood Hormel
