= William J. Powell =

Aviator

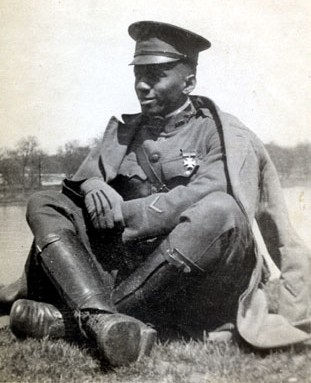
- Lt. William J. Powell in France, 1917
- Born: July 27, 1897; Henderson, Kentucky, US
- Died: July 12, 1942 (aged 44); Reno, Nevada, US
- Known for: Aviator, engineer, author

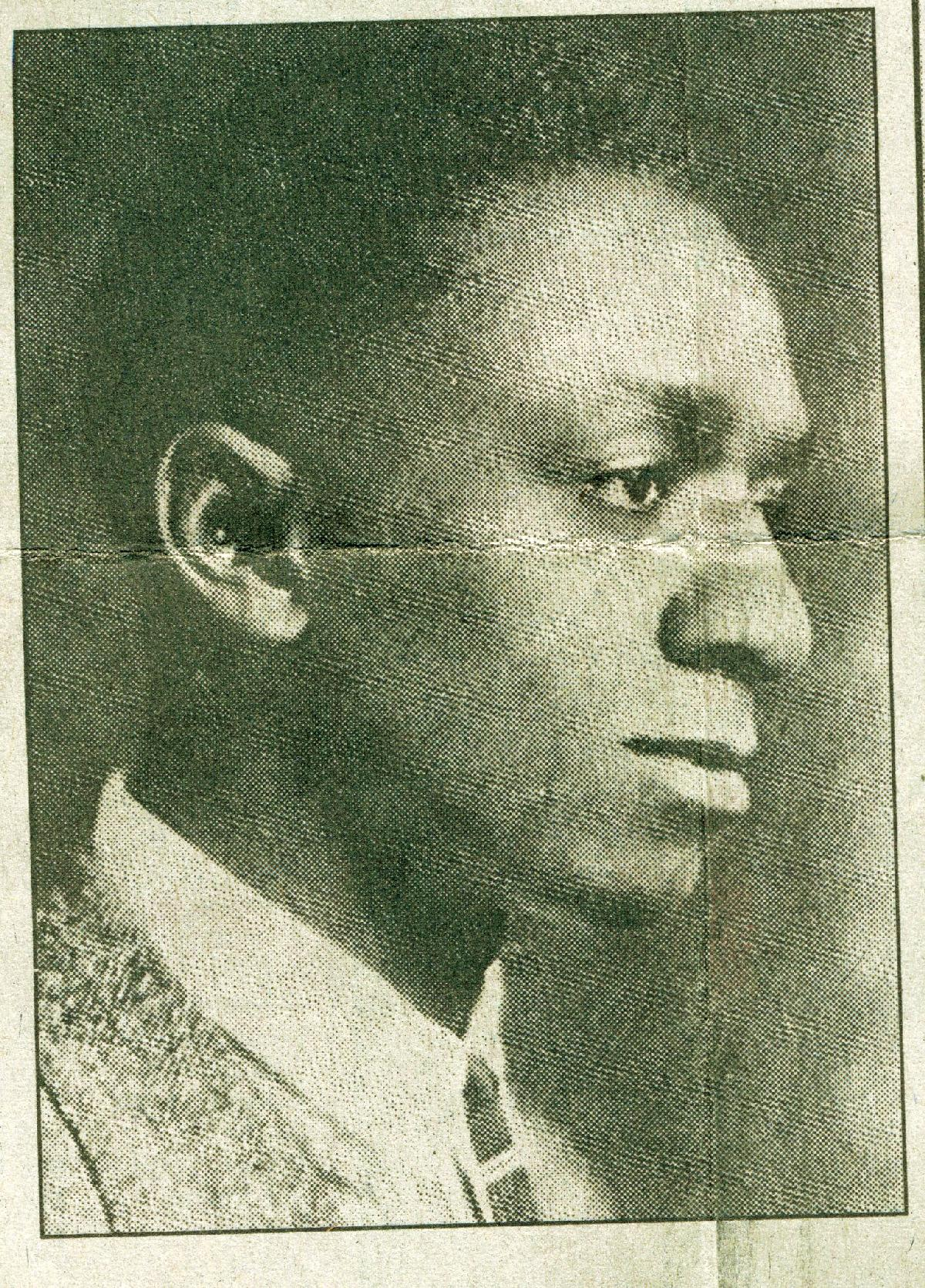
William J. Powell

William Jenifer Powell (July 27, 1897 – July 12, 1942) was an American engineer, soldier, civil aviator and writer who is credited with promoting aviation among the African-American community. Along with Bessie Coleman and James Banning, he is recognized as a pioneer aviator and a civil rights activist. Powell was optimistic about the prospects of African Americans in aviation, and believed that their involvement in the industry would help end racial prejudice at a time of widespread segregation under the Jim Crow laws.

== Early life ==
Powell was born in Henderson, Kentucky and moved with his family to Chicago, where he was accepted to the University of Illinois Urbana-Champaign electrical engineering program. His studies were cut short when he volunteered to the 370th Illinois Infantry Regiment and was shipped off to fight in World War I. He was wounded in a gas attack, and subsequently returned to the United States to finish his college degree. Powell was a member of Alpha Phi Alpha fraternity.

== Career ==
He was fascinated by flight and applied to the Army Air Corps and several other flight schools without success, until he was accepted at the Los Angeles School of Flight in 1928. Powell then founded the Bessie Coleman Aero Club, in honor of the first female black aviator, who had died three years before. In 1929, Chicago Congressman Oscar De Priest, then the nation's only black representative, visited Los Angeles. Powell took De Priest on a flight over the city, and subsequently asked Susan Hancock, Booker T. Washington's mother-in-law, to christen the plane with the congressman's name. Other personalities that visited Powell's club included Duke Ellington and Joe Louis.

To complement his work at the club, Powell also established a school to train mechanics and pilots, and published the Craftsmen Aero News, which he claimed to be the first African-American trade journal. On Labor Day 1931, the club sponsored the first all-black air show in the United States, which was attended by 15,000 spectators. By 1932, Powell was one of only 14 Black pilots in the United States, as well as being a licensed navigator and aeronautical engineer.

Bessie Coleman Aero was closed due to financial hardships caused by the Great Depression. In 1934 Powell published Black Wings, a fictionalized account of his own life, through which he aimed to inspire young African Americans to enter aviation not only as pilots, but as designers, engineers and mechanics. He called for them to "fill the air with black wings".

Powell died in 1942, probably due to the effects of his exposure to poison gas in the war. He is buried in the Los Angeles National Cemetery.
