= Camp Butler National Cemetery =

Historic veterans cemetery in Sangamon County, Illinois

- U.S. National Register of Historic Places
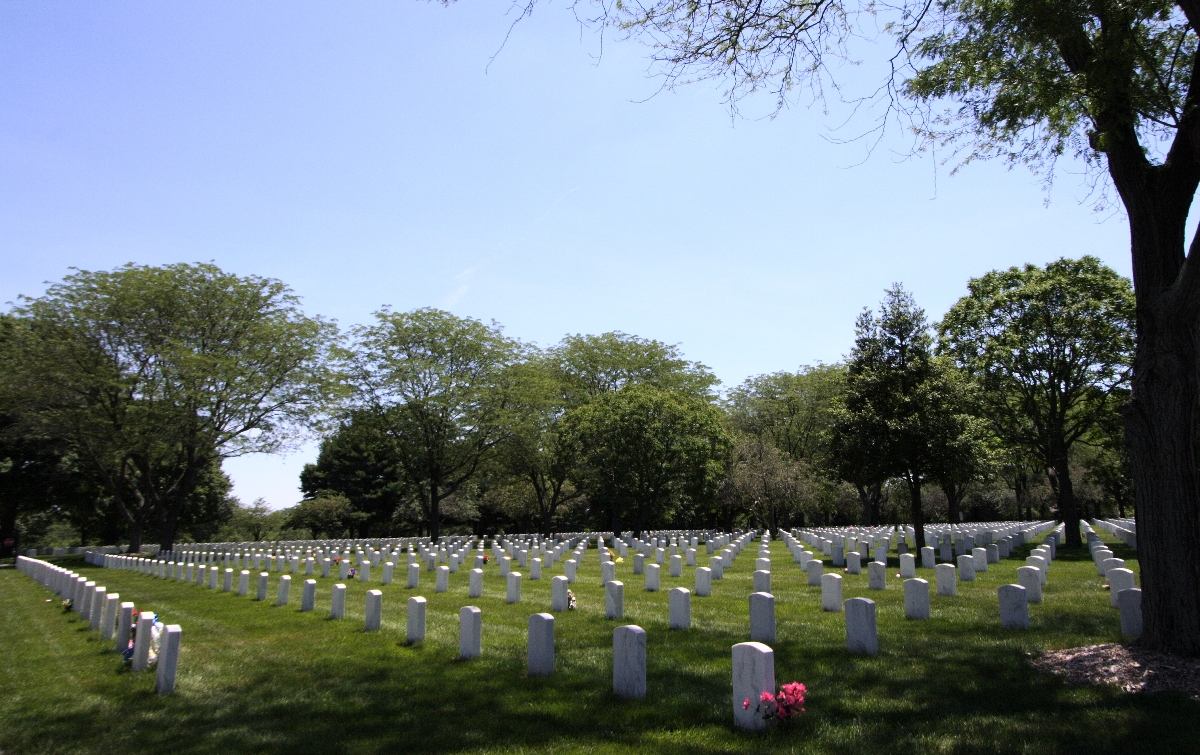

- Location within Illinois Location within the United States
- Location: 5063 Camp Butler Rd, Clear Lake Township, Sangamon County, Illinois
- Coordinates: 39°50′01″N 89°33′25″W
- Area: 39.2 acres (15.9 ha)
- Built: 1865
- Architectural style: Late 19th and Early 20th Century American Movements
- MPS: Civil War Era National Cemeteries MPS
- NRHP reference No.: 97000891
- Added to NRHP: August 15, 1997

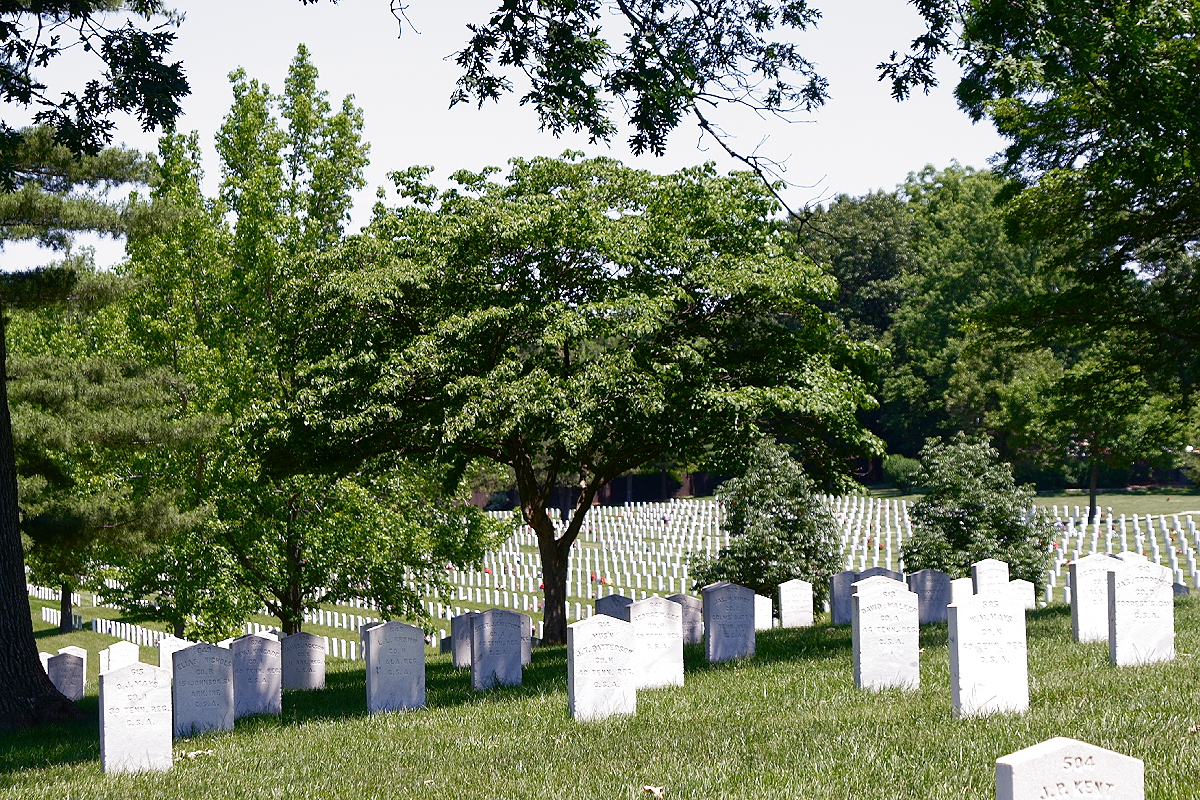
Confederate graves

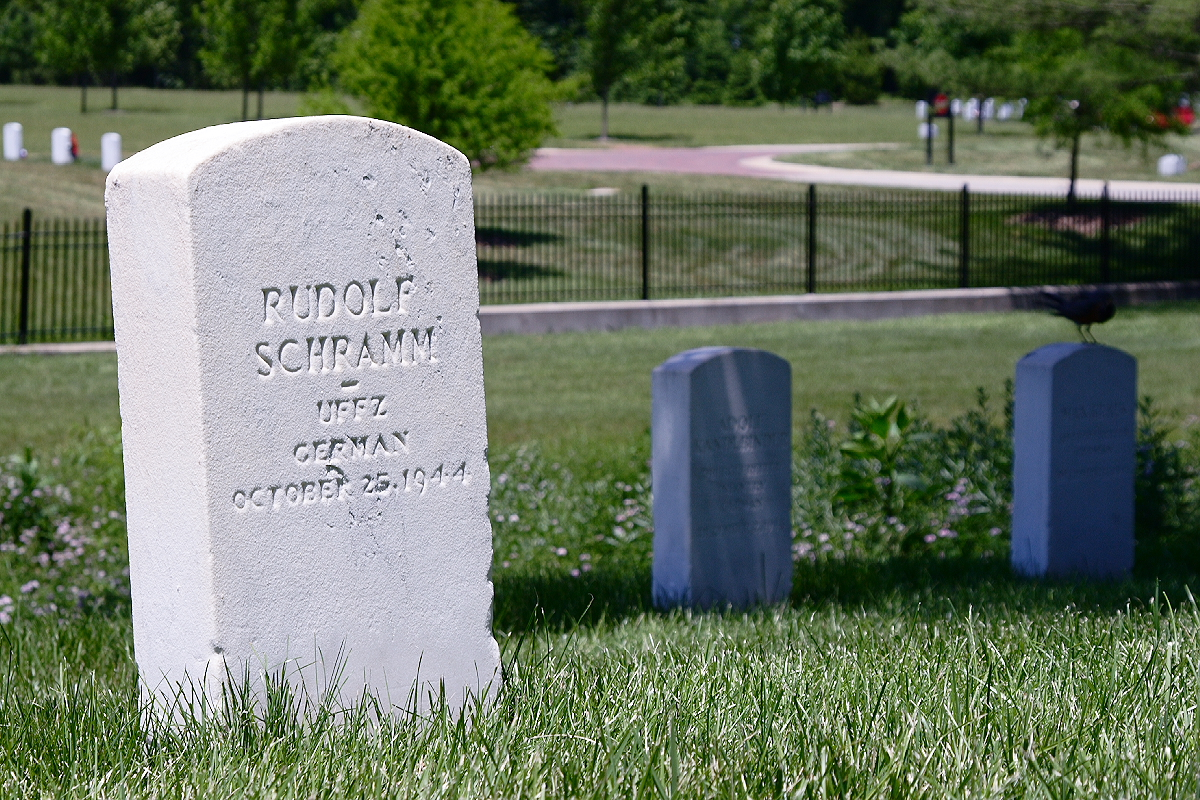
German POW graves

Camp Butler National Cemetery is a United States National Cemetery located a few miles northeast of Springfield and a few miles southwest of Riverton, a small town nearby to Springfield, in Sangamon County, Illinois. It was named for the Illinois State Treasurer at the time of its establishment, William Butler. Administered by the United States Department of Veterans Affairs, it occupies approximately 53 acres (21 ha), and is the site of 19,825 interments as of the end of 2005. Camp Butler National Cemetery was placed on the National Register of Historic Places in 1997.

== History ==
During the Civil War, Camp Butler was the second largest military training camp in Illinois, second only to Camp Douglas in Chicago. After President Lincoln's call for troops in April, 1861, the U.S. War Department sent then Brigadier-General William T. Sherman to Springfield, Illinois, to meet with Governor Richard Yates for the purpose of selecting a suitable site for a training facility.

Since Governor Yates was unfamiliar with the land around Springfield, the state capital of Illinois, he enlisted the aid of then-State Treasurer William Butler, who along with Ozias M. Hatch, Secretary of State of Illinois, took a carriage ride with William T. Sherman to examine land about 5 and 1/2 miles northeast of downtown Springfield. An area near Riverton, Illinois (then known as "Jimtown", short for Jamestown) was selected, and named in honor of William Butler. A Union training facility was officially established there on August 2, 1861. By the war's end, over 200,000 Union troops would pass through Camp Butler.

Along with the soldiers who fought on both sides of the Civil War, veterans who lost their lives in the Spanish–American War, both World War I and World War II, the Korean War, and the Vietnam War are also buried at Camp Butler. There are also German and Korean prisoners of war buried there, relocated from a cemetery near Indianapolis, Indiana.

=== Civil War ===
Originally the camp was designed to train and "muster-in" Illinois troops for the Civil War. It was quickly pressed into service to house the approximately 2,000 Confederate soldiers who had been taken prisoner at the surrender of Fort Donelson, in Tennessee on February 16, 1862.

An area was set aside for the burial of Confederate prisoners of war who died at the camp. As many as 700 prisoners died in 1862 when smallpox and other diseases were rampant in the camp. The situation was aggravated by the poor living conditions the prisoners endured there, and they were interred in the cemetery in their own Confederate section. A total of 866 Confederate prisoner's graves can be found today in the National Cemetery. The Confederate graves are easily distinguishable by the pointed headstones, which were instituted under the superstition that it was a means of preventing the devil from sitting on their graves. They are buried side by side with 776 graves of Union soldiers and enlistees, making a total of 1,642 Civil War graves.

== Notable interments ==
- Seaman John H. Catherwood (1888–1930), Medal of Honor recipient for action in the Philippine–American War
- Jack D. Davis (1935–2018), US Representative
- Frank S. Dickson (1876–1953), US Representative
- Colonel Otis B. Duncan (1873–1937), highest ranking African American officer during World War I
- Ray Ramsey (1921–2009), professional football player
