= Charles D. Alexander =

American writer

- Born: October 27, 1897; Ponca, Nebraska
- Died: 1962 (aged 64–65)
- Occupation: children's short story writer
- Spouse: Margaret Smith
- Children: One son Charles D.(Larry) and two daughters Chloris, Ardy.
- Writing career
- Language: English
- Genre: children's literature
- Notable works: Why I Choose to Live in Oregon, Portland, Oregon, Across the Chasm; The Blonde She of Yachats: a New Story of Black Buck; The Great Dog Who Went Back to the Wilderness After the Murder of his Master; The Noseless One

Charles Dewey Alexander (October 27, 1897 – 1962) was an American children's writer of short stories and novels.

He was born in Ponca, Nebraska. At the age of two, he moved to the Albany, Oregon area with his parents. He attended Albany schools and began working in the printing trade as a teenager, first in his brother's printing shop, then with the Albany Democrat newspaper. Two hundred of Alexander's short stories were published in magazines such as The Saturday Evening Post, Detective Fiction Weekly, Ace-High Detective Magazine, Blue Book and Sunset.

Alexander, also an expert linotype operator, retired as a full-time worker from the Democrat after 50 years in February 1962. His wife, Margaret Smith, whom he married in 1917, died in 1958.

== Works ==
- Why I Choose to Live in Oregon, Portland, Oregon: Portland Chamber of Commerce, 192-?
- Across the Chasm, Chicago, Story-Press, 1922
- The Blonde She of Yachats: a New Story of Black Buck, the Great Dog Who Went Back to the Wilderness After the Murder of his Master, Chicago: Story-press, 1922
- The Noseless One, Chicago: Story-Press, 1922
- The Place of Hisses, Chicago : Story-Press, 1922
- The Weasel's Kit, Chicago: Story-Press, 1922
- Wolf meets Wolf, Chicago: Story-Press, 1922
- The Young of the Wolf, Chicago: Story-Press, 1922
- The Fang in the Forest. New York: Dodd, Mead and Company, 1923
- The Splendid Summits, New York: Dodd, Mead and Company, 1925
- Bobbie, a Great Collie, New York, Dodd, Mead and Company, 1926

== See also ==
- Bobbie, the Wonder Dog
