= Otis B. Duncan =

American army officer (1873–1937)

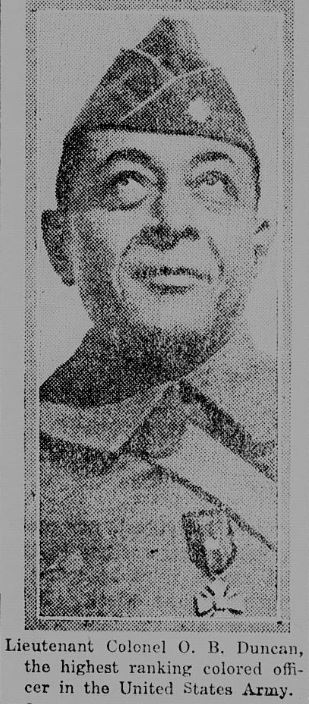
- Born: October 18, 1873; Springfield, Illinois, U.S.
- Died: May 17, 1937 (aged 63); Springfield, Illinois, U.S.
- Burial place: Camp Butler National Cemetery
- Military career
- Allegiance: United States of America
- Branch: United States Army
- Service years: 1902–1929
- Rank: Colonel
- Conflicts: Pancho Villa Expedition; World War I
- Awards: Purple Heart; Croix de Guerre

Otis Beverly Duncan (November 18, 1873 - May 17, 1937) was an American army officer. He was the highest-ranking African American in the American Expeditionary Forces at the end of World War I, serving as a lieutenant colonel in the 370th Infantry Regiment. His regiment was the only combat unit commanded by African-American officers.

== Biography ==
Illinois was different from other states during the Jim Crow era in that it organized, and paid for the training of, an all-African-American regiment within the Illinois National Guard. This unit, organized in the 1870s, was the 8th Illinois Infantry.

Otis B. Duncan was born on November 18, 1873, to Clark and Julia (née Chaverous or Chavous) Duncan. He was a member of a long-established African-American family of Springfield, Illinois; his father was a grocer and his maternal great-grandfather, barber William Florville, had been a friend of Abraham Lincoln.

In 1897, Duncan became a worker for the state of Illinois, serving in the Office of the Superintendent of Public Instruction (the predecessor of the current Illinois State Board of Education). In addition, Duncan entered the Illinois National Guard in 1902; assigned to the 8th Illinois, he was commissioned as an officer. When the 8th Illinois was called into national service during the Pancho Villa Expedition into Mexico in 1916, Duncan served as a major on the regimental staff.

=== Springfield race riot ===
Despite (or perhaps because of) his service as an officer in the Illinois National Guard, Duncan was a prominent victim of the Springfield Race Riot of 1908. Contemporary news accounts indicate that a white mob broke into and ransacked Duncan's house; they shattered furniture, smashed the family piano and used Duncan's National Guard saber to gouge out the eyes of a portrait of Duncan's mother that was hanging in the house. The mob was reported to have stolen clothes, jewelry and everything of value they could find, including the saber. The weapon is reported to have been recovered and returned to Duncan. The sword thief was arrested, convicted, and sentenced to serve 30 days in the county jail.

=== World War I ===
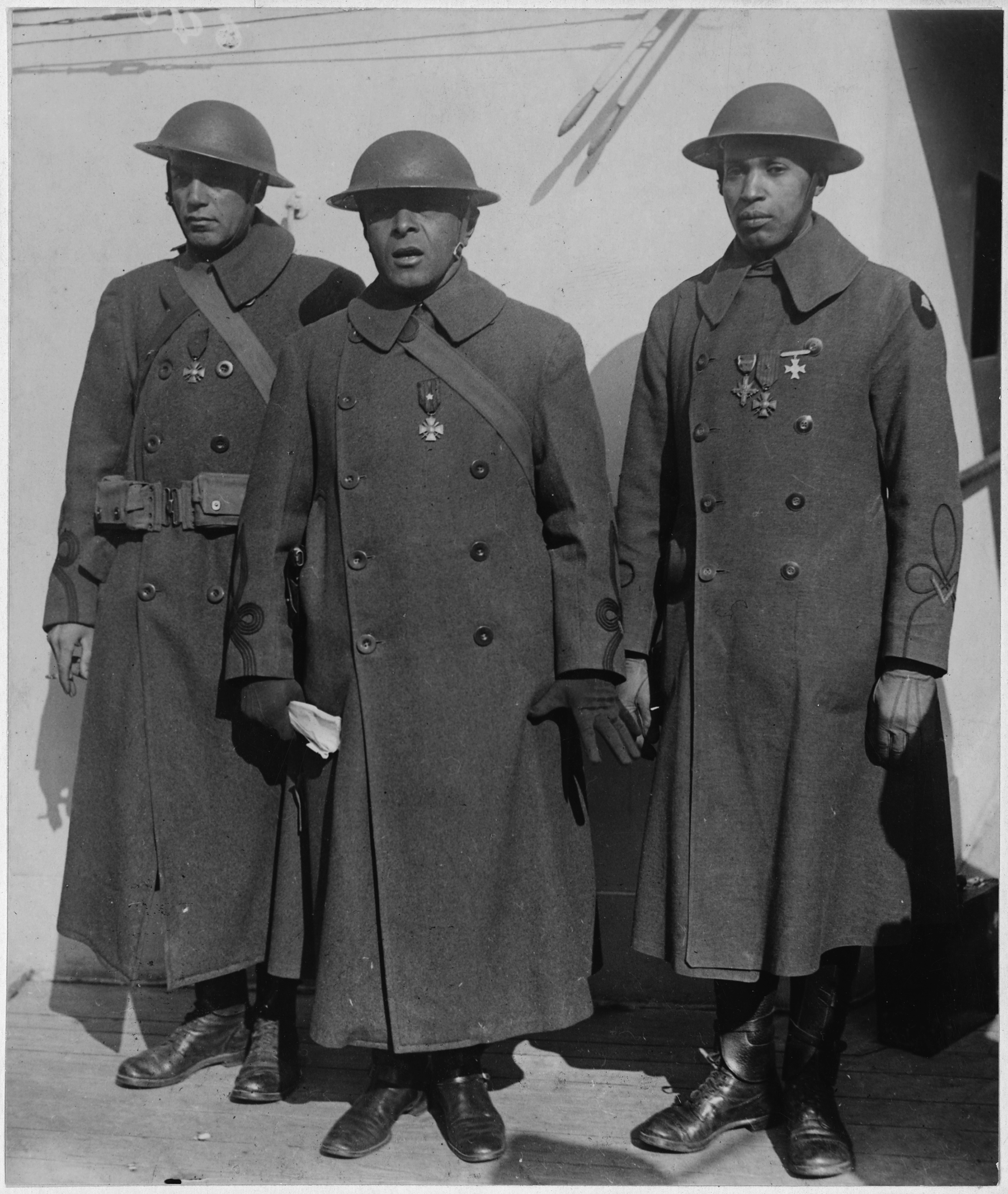
Lieutenant Colonel Otis B. Duncan (center) with Major J.R. White, and Lieutenant W.J. Warfield, (1919)

After the American entry into World War I, in April 1917, the 8th Illinois, still in national service, was renamed the 370th Infantry Regiment. It was the only African-American regiment to go into the American Expeditionary Forces (A.E.F.) while retaining most of its African-American command structure. As the infantry took ship for the Western Front, Duncan became the field commander of the regiment's 3rd Battalion. Still in this capacity, he was promoted to lieutenant colonel on April 3, 1918. After the regimental commander, Colonel Franklin A. Denison, was replaced by a white officer, Lieutenant Colonel Duncan became the highest ranking African-American officer in the A.E.F. This was a significant achievement due to the segregationist attitudes of President Woodrow Wilson and his secretary of war, Newton D. Baker. While serving on the Western Front against the German Army, Duncan was awarded the Purple Heart and the French Croix de Guerre for gallantry in action.

The 370th fought on the Western Front during the final months of World War I. Possibly for political reasons, the African-American regiment was detached from the larger units of the A.E.F. and integrated into the French Tenth Army. Soldiers of the 370th fought with French equipment and rations. The men of the regiment are said to have been nicknamed the "Black Devils" by the German troops who fought against them.

=== Postwar ===
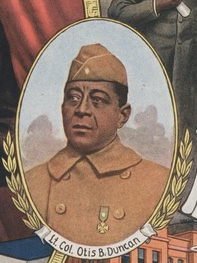
Otis Beverly Duncan in 1919 art

After the war, the 370th Infantry reverted to its prewar status as the 8th Illinois Infantry, and Duncan was promoted on March 18, 1919, to the rank of colonel and commander of the regiment. The regiment was headquartered at Springfield's Camp Lincoln. In February 2017, authorities announced the discovery of a post-World War I 8th Illinois collar disc, a service unit insignia artifact connected to the date of Col. Duncan's command.

== Retirement, death and honors ==
Colonel Duncan retired from the state education bureau in 1929 and died on May 17, 1937. He is buried in Camp Butler National Cemetery near Riverton, Illinois, in section 3, grave #835. Duncan is the eponym for American Legion Post 809 in Springfield, Illinois. A Springfield Park District park, formerly named in honor of Stephen A. Douglas, was renamed in his honor in 2020.
