= Victory Monument (Chicago) =

- Victory Sculpture
- U.S. National Register of Historic Places
- U.S. Historic district – Contributing property
- Chicago Landmark
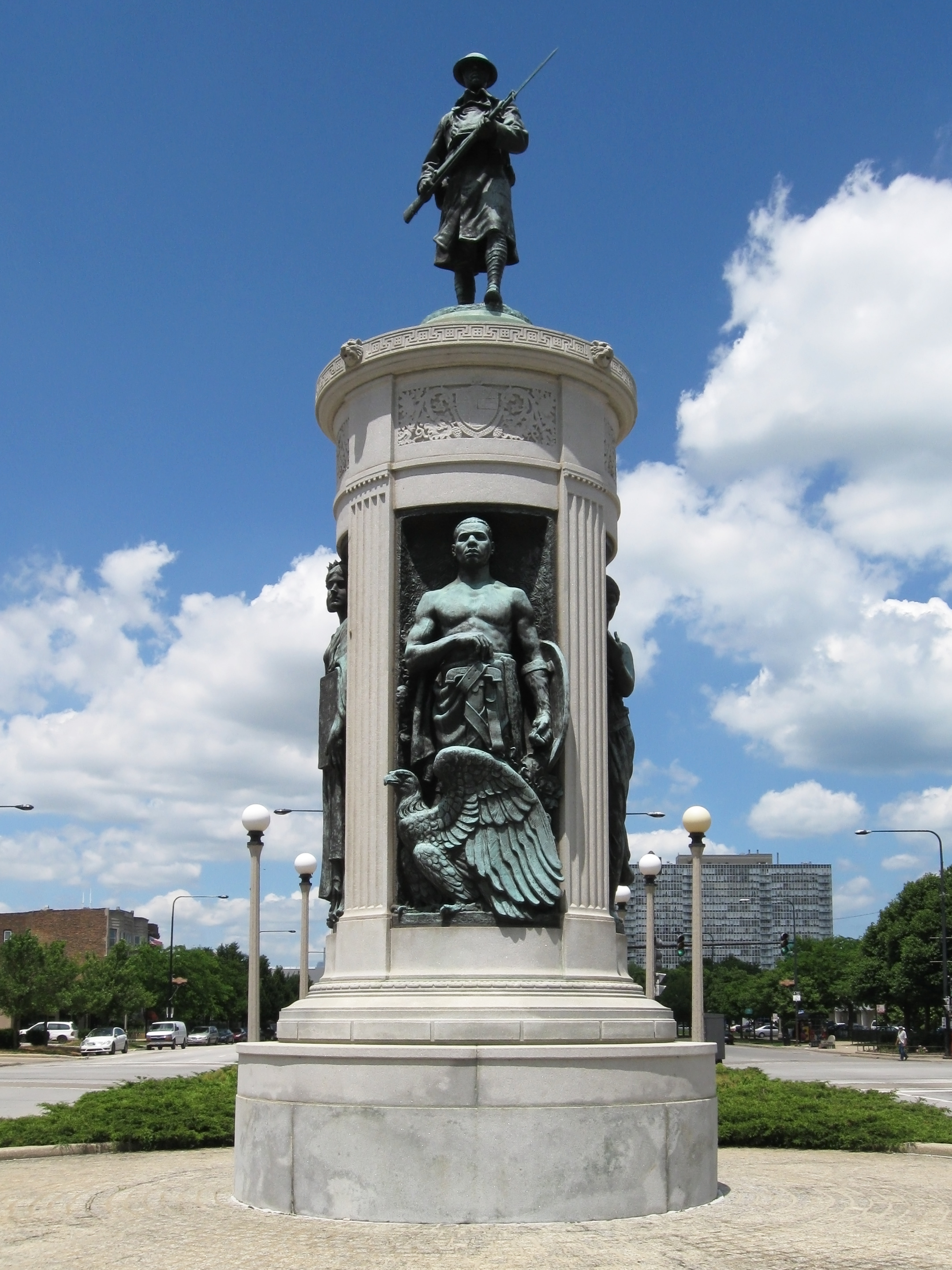
- View facing north

- Location within Chicago
- Location: 35th Street and King Drive; Chicago, IL
- Coordinates: 41°49′50.6″N 87°37′1.7″W
- Built: 1927
- Architect: John A. Nyden
- Sculptor: Leonard Crunelle
- MPS: Black Metropolis TR
- NRHP reference No.: 86001089

Significant dates
- Added to NRHP: April 30, 1986
- Designated CHICL: September 9, 1998

Erected in 1927, the Victory Monument is a bronze and granite sculptural monument, based on a concept by John A. Nyden and sculpted by Leonard Crunelle. It was built to honor the Eighth Regiment of the Illinois National Guard, an African-American unit that served with distinction in France during World War I. It may be the only memorial statue dedicated to African-American soldiers of the Great War.

The memorial monument is located in the Black Metropolis-Bronzeville District in the Douglas community area on the South Side of Chicago, Illinois. The structure was added to the National Register of Historic Places on April 30, 1986. It was designated a Chicago Landmark on September 9, 1998. An annual Memorial Day ceremony is held at the monument.

== Description and history ==
The Smithsonian Institution’s Archives of American Art describes the monument:

A white granite shaft topped with a bronze doughboy sculpture. On the monument's shaft are three bronze relief panels depicting life-sized figures. (Victory Panel:) Left full-length profile of a Classically draped African-American female figure representing motherhood. In her hand she holds a branch symbolizing Victory. (Columbia Panel:) Full-length Classically draped female figure with a helmet on her head. In her proper left hand she holds a tablet inscribed with the names of battles in which African-American soldiers fought. (African-American Soldier Panel:) A bare chested African-American soldier of the 370th Infantry, which fought in France, standing with an eagle in left profile in front of him.

In 1927, the State of Illinois erected this monument in the Chicago neighborhood known as "Bronzeville," which was home of the "Fighting Eighth" Regiment of the Illinois National Guard. The names of 137 members of the Eighth Infantry, Illinois National Guard, who lost their lives during World War I, are inscribed on a bronze panel. The Eighth Regiment of the Illinois National Guard was reorganized as the 370th U.S. Infantry of the 93rd Division, and this regiment saw service on WWI major battlefields. It was the last regiment pursuing the retreating German forces in the Aisne-Marne region of France, just before the November 11, 1918 Armistice. The doughboy on top of the shaft was added in 1936.

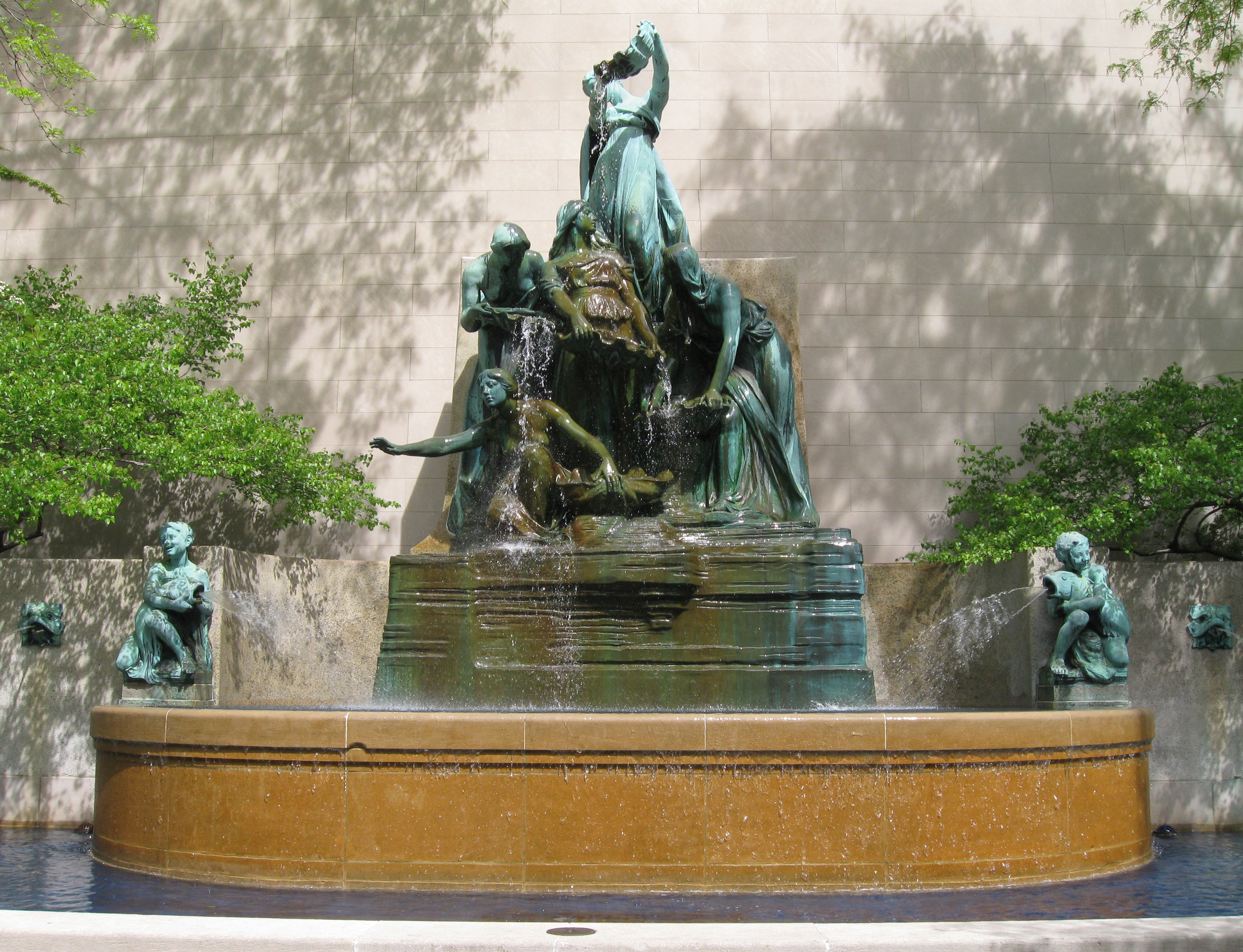
Fountain of the Great Lakes was almost located at 35th and King Drive; it is at the Art Institute of Chicago.

In 1908 while Aaron Montgomery Ward was contesting the land use law for Grant Park for a second time in the Illinois Supreme Court, the Art Institute of Chicago considered locating the Fountain of the Great Lakes at 35th Street and Grand Boulevard (the latter has been renamed as Dr. Martin Luther King, Jr. Drive.) Instead, the Victory Monument was installed at this intersection.

The Bud Billiken Parade has for many years traveled along King Drive. In some years, the Parade has started at 31st and King and in other years it has started as far south as 39th and King Drive. It has often started very near this monument.

In 2017, the monument received a grant for restoration as part of World War I centennial activities.

== Features ==
The monument features 4 bronze panels and a sculpture of a soldier atop that was added in 1936. To the north of the monument is a court with 4 plaques in the large tilings. The plaques honor Robert Henry Lawrence, Jr., Truman Gibson, Sr./Truman Gibson, Jr., Franklin A. Denison, & George R. Giles. To the south of the monument is a flagpole that flies the United States flag, Flag of Chicago, POW/MIA flag.

== Gallery ==
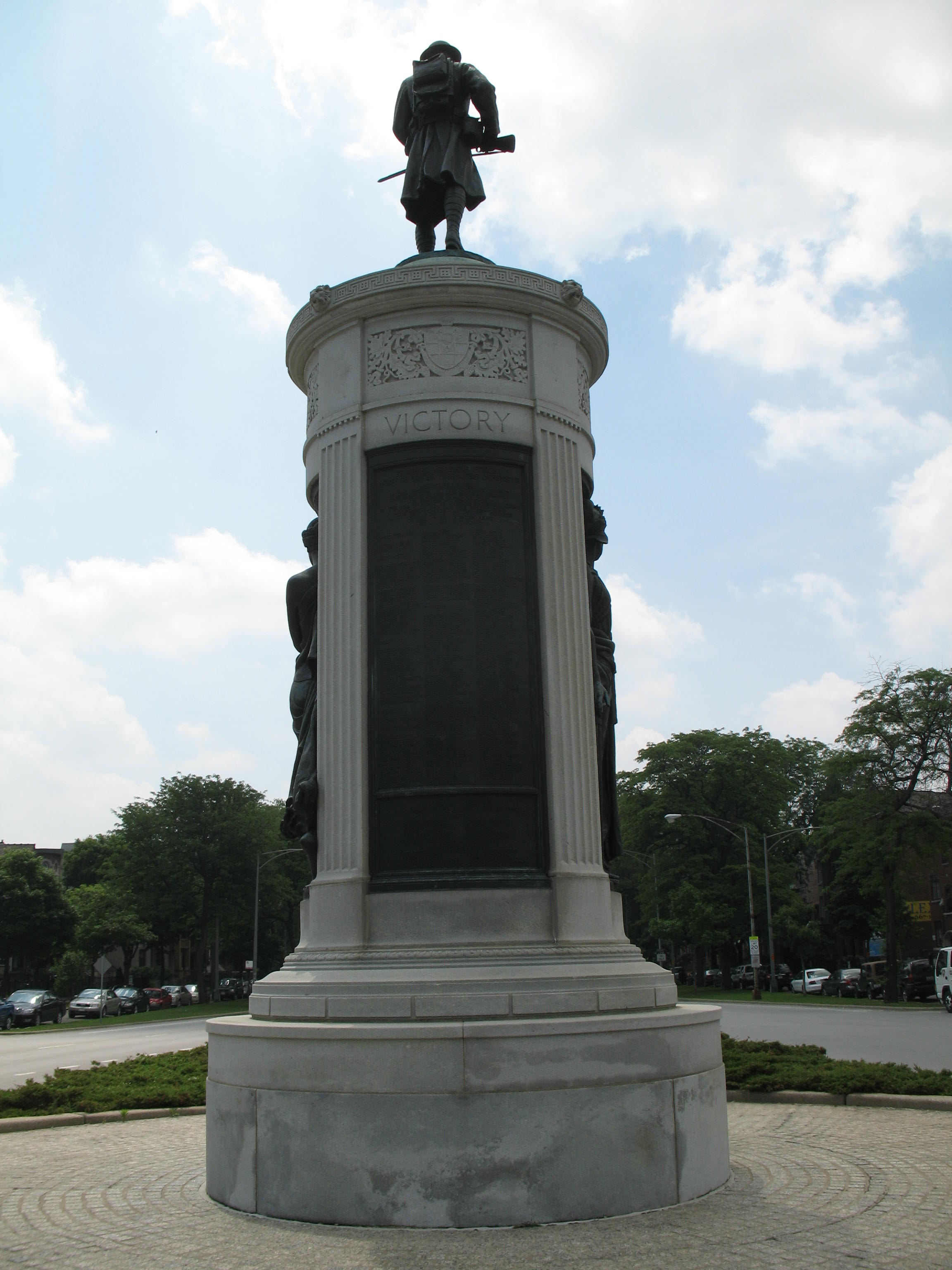
Close up view facing south

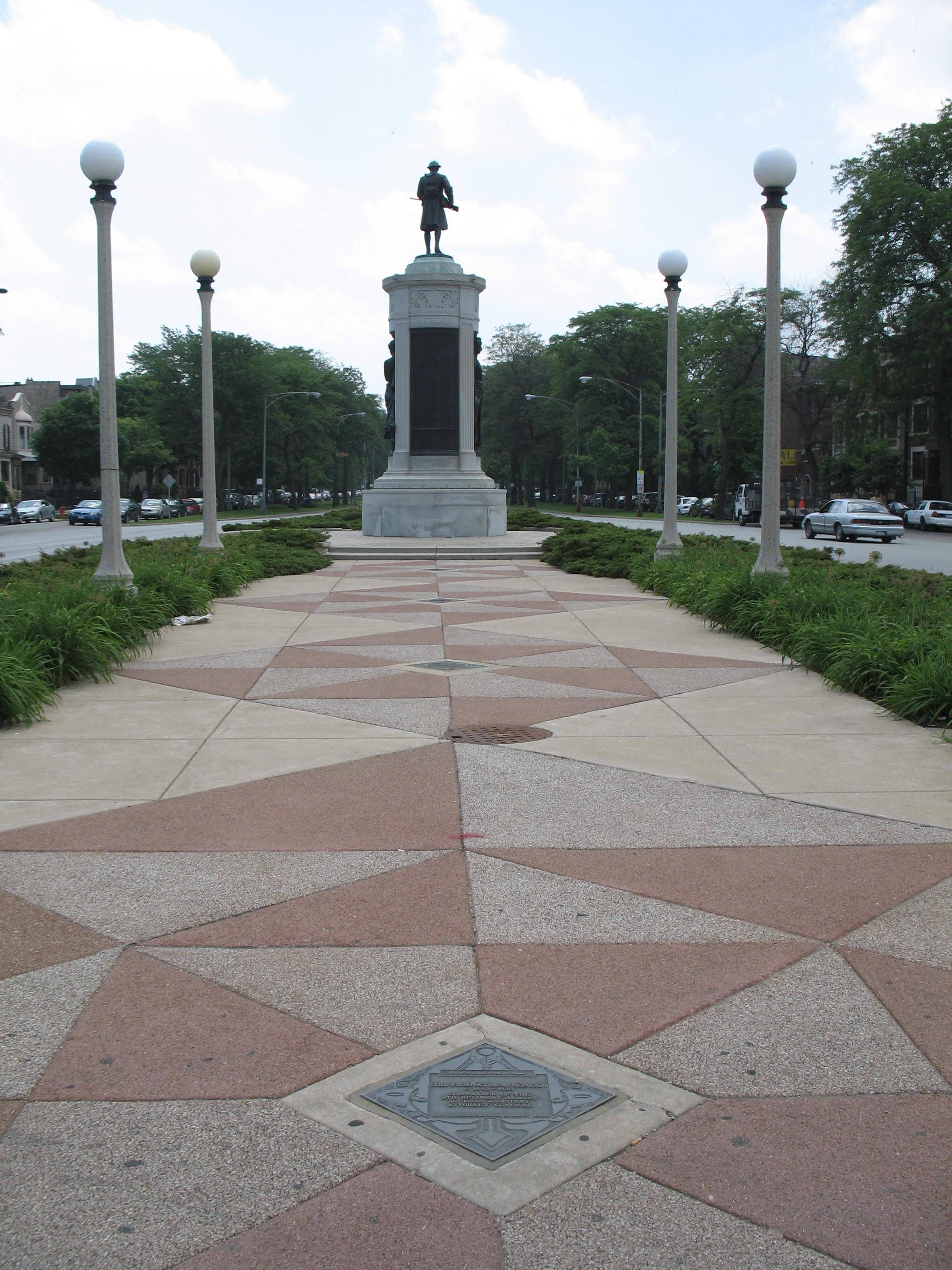
View facing south

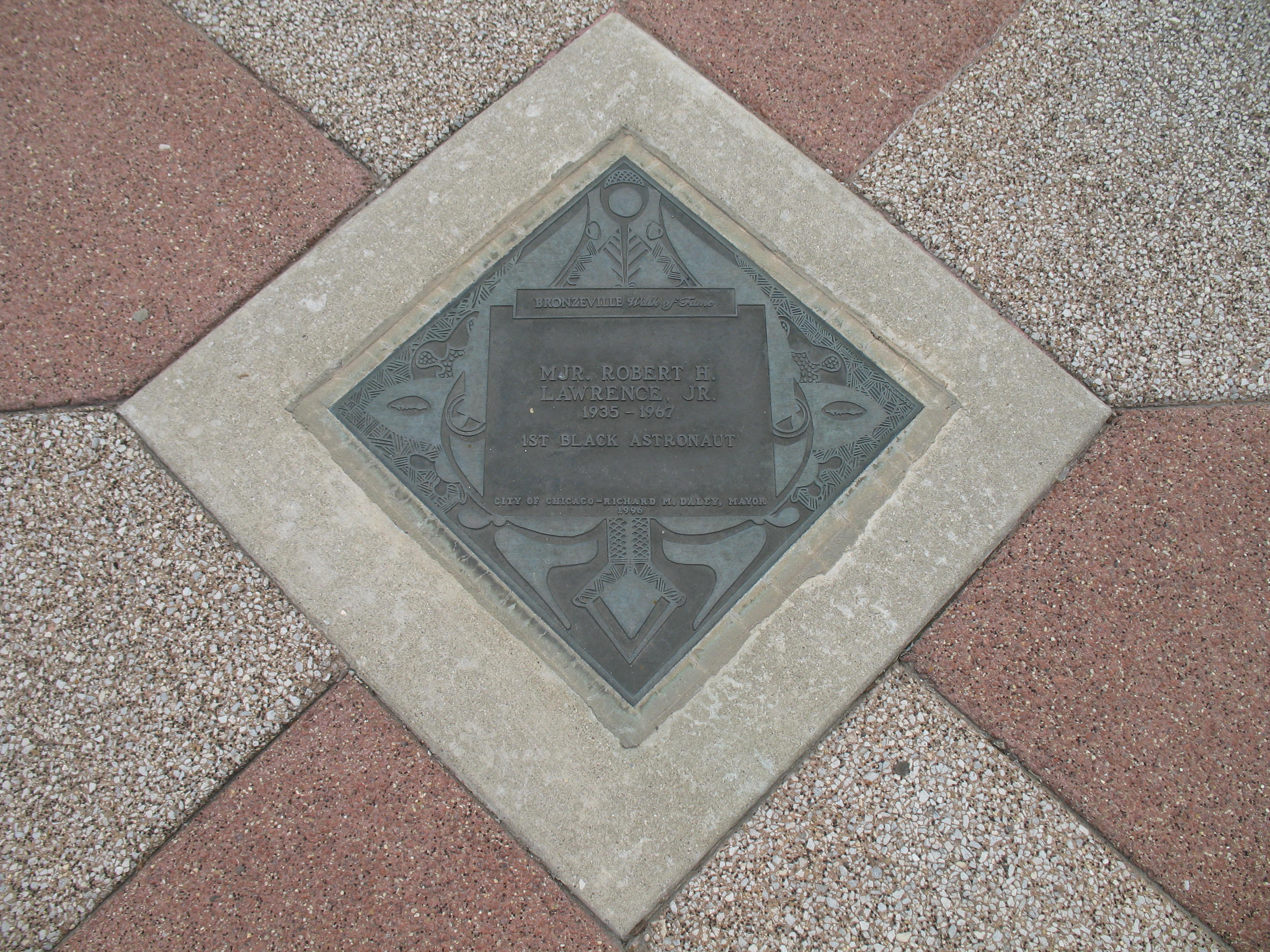
North walking court plaque

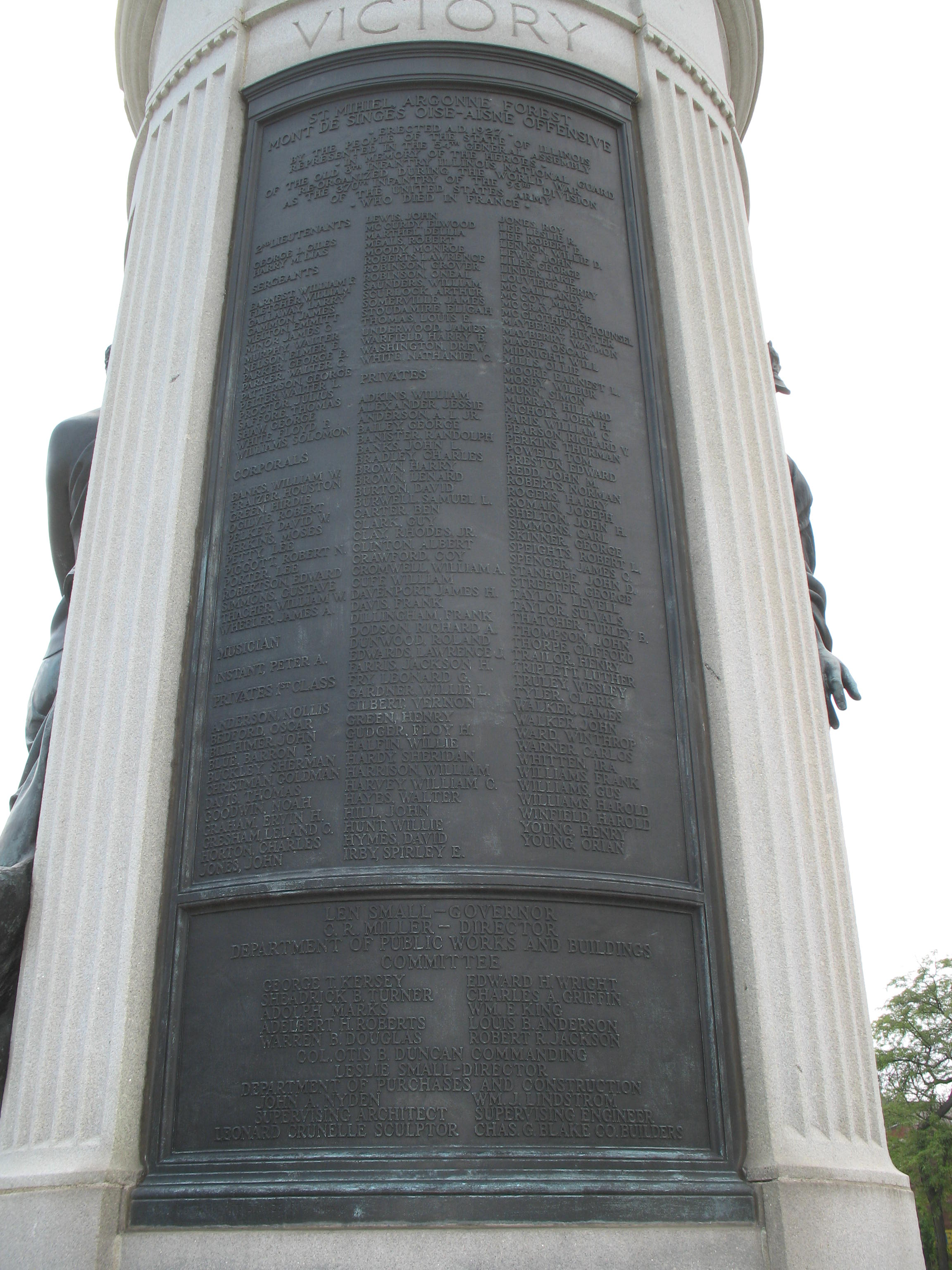
Memorial plaque

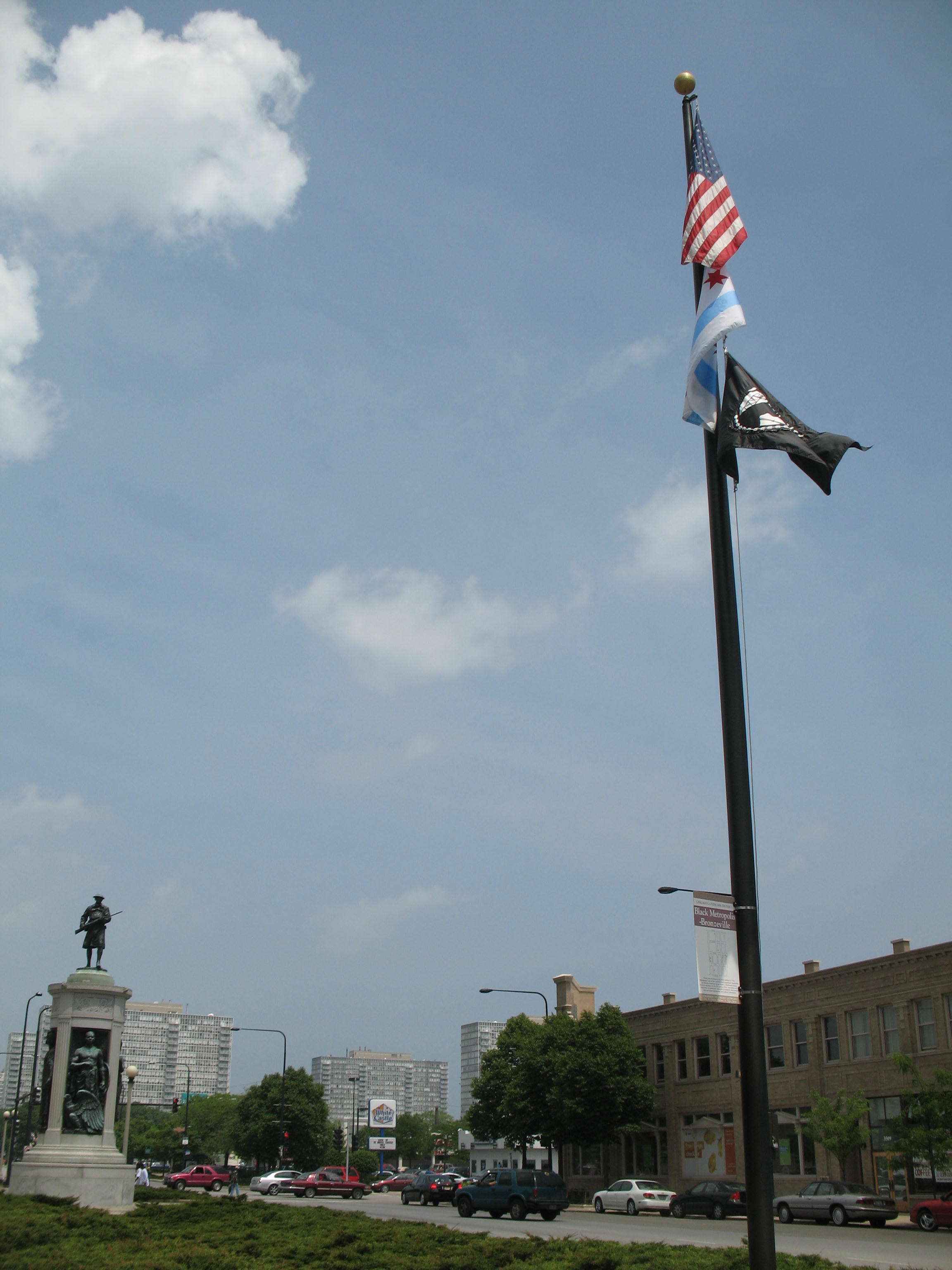
Monument and flagpole

== See also ==
- 370th Infantry Regiment (United States)
- List of public art in Chicago
