= Charles Alexander (cricketer, born 1839) =

Indian-born English lawyer, engineer and school teacher

Charles Dallas Alexander (25 December 1839 – 22 January 1917) was an Indian-born English lawyer, engineer and school teacher who played cricket for Kent County Cricket Club. He was born at Calcutta, the third son of William and Janet Alexander. His father worked in the Bengal Civil Service and served for a time as a judge at Bhagalpur.

== Early life ==
Alexander was educated at Harrow School, Cheltenham College and King's College School, London. He went up to Trinity College, Cambridge in 1859 and graduated in 1863 after being admitted to Lincoln's Inn in London to study law in 1861.

== Cricket ==
Alexander had played in the Cheltenham cricket XI and at university, although not for the full Cambridge team, as well as for Town Malling and the Gentlemen of Kent. He made a single first-class cricket appearance during the 1864 season against England. He scored eight runs in the first innings of the match and three runs in the second, in a match in which Kent fielded thirteen players to England's eleven.

== Professional and later life ==
Professionally Alexander enjoyed a varied career. He abandoned a legal career in favour of engineering, becoming an Associate of the Institution of Civil Engineers in 1868 and taking up a position at the London, Chatham & Dover Railway's Longhedge Locomotive Works at Battersea. By the 1881 census he had moved to become headteacher at Grange School in Ewell before moving back into engineering by 1888. He also seems to have worked as a private tutor.

Alexander married Helen Shuldham. The couple had at least five children, one of whom went up to Cambridge in 1896. In later life he appears to have suffered from some form of mental collapse and was living in private medical care at both the 1901 and 1911 census. He died at Tankerton in Kent in 1917 aged 77.

== Bibliography ==
- Carlaw, Derek (2020). Kent County Cricketers, A to Z: Part One (1806–1914) (PDF). Cardiff: ACS.
