= George Washington Antione =

American physician (1878 – 1939)

George Washington Antoine
- Born: November 26, 1878; Texas, US
- Died: August 17, 1939 (aged 60); Houston, Texas, US
- Education: Meharry Medical College (1906)
- Occupation: Physician
- Spouse: Lottie Voliver
- Children: 1

George Washington Antoine, M.D. (November 26, 1878 – August 17, 1939) was a prominent Houston physician who served as an army doctor in 370th Infantry Regiment of 93rd Division during World War I.

== Early life ==
Antoine was born in Texas. Information on Antoine is scarce until his admission to Guadalupe College in Seguin, Texas, where he took sessions in algebra and Latin. Guadalupe College was one of the first African American schools of higher education situated in Southern Texas.

In 1906, Antoine graduated from Meharry Medical College in Nashville, Tennessee and soon after married. Along with several school colleagues, Antoine opened a practice in Houston.

== Military service ==
In 1917, Dr. Antoine volunteered for service in France during World War I and reported to the Fort Des Moines Medical Officers Training Camp. After remaining in the camp for 38 days, Dr. Antoine transferred first to Camp Fuston, then Camp Logan. He was assigned to the 370th Infantry Regiment of the 93rd Division, which was composed mostly of African-American soldiers from the Illinois National Guard. Dr. Antoine was given the title First Lieutenant and got assigned to Depot Company K as a medical doctor.

Fearing the threat of race riots coming from Camp Logan, Dr. Antoine and his unit were sent to France on the SS President Grant in 1918, and were handed to French command by order of General Pershing. An assessment of the 370th's performance indicates that during the fall offensive of September 15, 1918, the division was able to fight off the enemy and keep steady.

When the war ended, First Lieutenant Antoine assisted the transfer of injured troops to New York and Texas to ensure proper medical care. He was discharged on February 23, 1919.

== Career ==
Antoine returned home and continued running his practice in Houston, Texas for the next 20 years. He practiced at the Houston Negro Hospital and was active in the Lone Star State Medical Dental, and Pharmaceutical Association, later becoming its vice-president in 1928.

== Death and legacy ==
On August 17, 1939, Antoine died of heart disease and was mentioned in an obituary for the Chicago Defender. Funeral services were conducted in his residence at Houston. A street in Houston, Antoine Drive, was named after him in respect to his service to the Houston community, both as a soldier and physician. One of Houston's American Legion Posts was named in his honor.

== Personal life ==
Antoine was married to 19-year-old Lottie Voliver in 1906 and moved in with her and her six-year-old nephew in Arkansas before returning to Texas. They had one daughter together named Mattie Louise, born 1925. Lottie died on October 5, 1927. Shortly before his death, Dr. Antoine married a woman named Zella.
