= UC Berkeley – UCSF Joint Medical Program =

The UC Berkeley-UCSF Joint Medical Program (JMP) is a joint degree program in the University of California system between the UC Berkeley School of Public Health and the UCSF School of Medicine. Students spend their pre-clerkship years at UC Berkeley engaging in a unique medical curriculum centered around student-led inquiry while simultaneously earning a master's degree (MS) in the Health and Medical Sciences at Berkeley Public Health. After two and a half years, students move across the Bay to UCSF to finish their medical education and receive their medical doctorate (MD).

== Admissions ==
Applicants submit their primary applications to the UCSF School of Medicine through the normal AMCAS application process. After receiving a secondary application for UCSF, applicants will indicate interest in JMP by checking off the JMP box. Applicants will be prompted to provide additional JMP-specific materials, including two short essay questions. Only applicants who have checked the JMP box on their UCSF secondary application will be considered for JMP admission. The AMCAS application, secondary application, and letters of recommendation will be used to identify applicants who will be invited for interviews. Interview decisions are made on a rolling basis. The JMP class has 16 students each year.

== Curriculum ==
The JMP curriculum is constructed around three interconnected branches of learning and each of which is built around themes of health equity and change making. JMP students engage in scholarly exploration and inquiry through their Master's in Health and Medical Sciences. At the same time, students learn Foundational Medical Sciences through their active, learner-led, small group Problem Based Learning (PBL) curriculum, and the skills of doctoring through the Clinical Skills curriculum which includes classroom learning and placements in Bay Area clinics. Additionally, the PRIME-US program is a joint opportunity with UCSF providing additional learning opportunities to work with urban underserved communities. And finally, the abundant opportunities available at UC Berkeley provide JMP students to learn preclinical medicine grounded in community health and health equity.

The last two and a half years are spent doing clinical clerkships at UCSF with 3rd and 4th year students from the traditional program. This time is the equivalent of parts 2 and 3 of UCSF's Bridges curriculum.

=== Masters in Science Curriculum ===
The master's in science (MS) curriculum supports the JMP's vision to develop health equity focused physicians and public health changemakers by adding a framework of collaborative practice, systems thinking and critical inquiry to the traditional medical education. This framework affords students the intellectual, practical, and humanistic skills to promote and lead change processes aimed at improving the health and wellbeing of individuals and communities. The master's curriculum, like the overall JMP approach, involves experiences that lead to transformation by centering inquiry, questioning dominant ideologies, and supporting the learner in the creation of new habits of mind and new points of view that result from deep reflection and emotional involvement.

Their approach is 3 pronged:

1) structured mentorship for a master's project,

2) foundational courses in Public Health and Health Systems that support the student's project and contextualizes the practice of medicine

3) freedom to choose additional courses that support the student's project.

=== Foundational Medical Sciences ===
Fostering lifelong learning through curiosity and an inquiring mindset is a foundational tenet at the JMP. The “constructivist” approach of Problem-Based Learning (PBL) is designed to promote independence in the student learning process while also developing the vital communication, teamwork, and clinical reasoning skills they will need as doctors. All the foundational medical sciences including the traditional basic biomedical sciences such as physiology, biochemistry, pathology, histology, pharmacology and the social and behavioral sciences as well, are presented through real patient cases.

=== Clinical Skills and Placements ===
The JMP Clinical Skills (CS) curriculum introduces JMP students to the fundamentals of clinical skills, the environments in which healthcare is delivered and the social structures and forces which affect them. Principles of health equity are integrated throughout the CS curriculum. The curriculum includes a focus on inter-professional education and teamwork. Coursework is designed to integrate with a wide variety of graduate classes that explore the structures and systems that affect health and health care including Critical Race Theory, Structural Competency, Motivational Interviewing, Systems Improvement and other clinically relevant studies through in-depth elective graduate classes offered by any department at UC Berkeley.
