= Charlie Alexander =

American jazz pianist

Charlie Alexander (May 29, 1890 – February 4, 1970) was an American jazz pianist from Cincinnati, Ohio.

In 1917, he was the Band Sergeant for the 370th Infantry Regiment's band.

Alexander played in theater orchestras accompanying silent films in the early 1920s. Later that decade he moved to Chicago and found work touring with the band of J. Rosamond Johnson. Following this he played with Baby Dodds and Johnny Dodds; he and Johnny formed a trio with bassist Bill Johnson in 1928. He also played in Johnny Dodds's Washboard band alongside Lil Hardin on vocals.

At the end of the 1920s he joined Louis Armstrong's big band, playing with him until 1932. At live performances, Armstrong sometimes jokingly described Alexander as his pianist from New Orleans.

Later in his life Alexander settled in California.
