= Clarence Albert Bacote =

American historian (1906–1981)

Clarence Albert Bacote (February 24, 1906 – 1981) was a historian and activist from the U.S. state of Georgia. He was a professor of political history at Atlanta University and a political organizer. The Robert W. Woodruff Library at the Atlanta University Center have collections of his papers.

== Early life and education ==
Bacote was born February 24, 1906, in Kansas City, Missouri. He was the only son and eldest of Samuel William and Lucy (Bledsoe) Bacote's three children. His father was a Baptist minister born in Society Hill, South Carolina, who graduated from Benedict College, Virginia Union, and Kansas City University. His mother was a musician who worked with church choral groups.

Bacote graduated from the University of Kansas in 1926 with Bachelor of Arts degree in history. He earned a Master of Arts degree in history in 1929. He continued his studies with degree of Doctor of Philosophy in American History from the University of Chicago in 1955. His doctoral dissertation was titled The Negro in Georgia Politics, 1880–1908.

== Career ==
After a long career at Atlanta University, he joined the history department at Morehouse College in 1977 and worked there until he died in 1981.

== Writing ==
He wrote articles and reviews for the Journal of Negro History, Negro History Bulletin, and Phylon. His book The Story of Atlanta University was published in 1969.

He wrote several books including:

- The Negro in Georgia Politics, 1880-1908 Volumes 1 and 2 (1987)
- Higher Education in Virginia Between 1830 and 1860 (1929)
- The Story of Atlanta University; A Century of Service 1865-1965 (1969)

== Activism ==
He led Citizenship Schools sponsored by the Atlanta branch of the N.A.A.C.P. and was involved in voted registration drives.

== Personal life ==
He married Lucia Moore of Atlanta, Georgia, on August 3, 1931. They had two children: Lucia Jean and Samuel William II.
