= John Hugh Catherwood =

- Born: August 7, 1888; Springfield, Illinois
- Died: November 18, 1930 (aged 42); Springfield, Illinois
- Burial place: Camp Butler National Cemetery
- Military career
- Allegiance: United States of America
- Branch: United States Navy
- Rank: Ordinary Seaman
- Unit: USS Pampanga (PG-39)
- Conflicts: Moro Rebellion, Philippine–American War
- Awards: Medal of Honor

John Hugh Catherwood (August 7, 1888 – November 18, 1930) was a United States Navy Ordinary Seaman received the Medal of Honor for actions during the Moro Rebellion aboard USS Pampanga (PG-39) Seaman Catherwood was critically wounded during the action on September 24, 1911, for which he and six other men were awarded their medals. Catherwood died of a self-inflicted gunshot wound on November 18, 1930. Seaman Catherwood is buried in the Camp Butler National Cemetery.

== Medal of Honor citation ==
Rank and organization: Ordinary Seaman, U.S. Navy. Born: August 7, 1888, Springfield, Ill. Accredited to: Illinois. G.O. No.: 138, December 13, 1911.

Citation:

While attached to the U.S.S. Pampang, Catherwood was one of a shore party moving in to capture Mundang, on the island of Basilan, Philippine Islands, on the morning of 24 September 1911. Advancing with the scout party to reconnoiter a group of nipa huts close to the trail, Catherwood unhesitatingly entered the open area before the huts, where his party was suddenly taken under point-blank fire and charged by approximately 20 enemy Moros coming out from inside the native huts and from other concealed positions. Struck down almost instantly by the outlaws' deadly fire, Catherwood, although unable to rise, rallied to the defense of his leader and fought desperately to beat off the hostile attack. By his valiant effort under fire and in the face of great odds, Catherwood contributed materially toward the destruction and rout of the enemy.

== See also ==
- List of Medal of Honor recipients
- List of Philippine–American War Medal of Honor recipients
