= 370th Infantry Regiment =

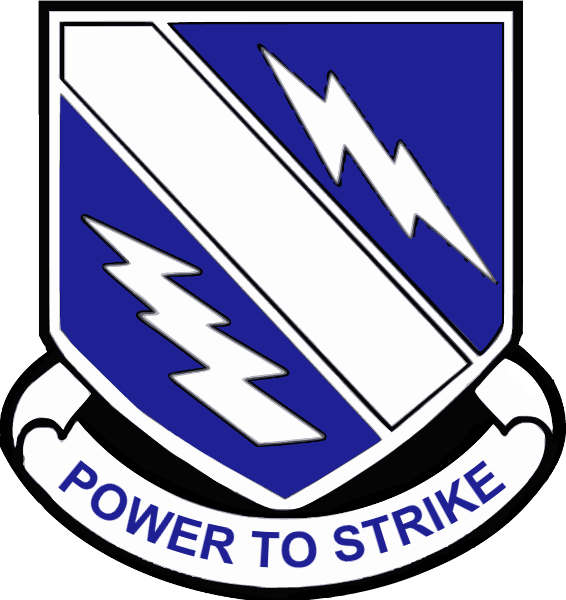
- Active: 1917–1919
- Country: USA
- Branch: United States Army National Guard

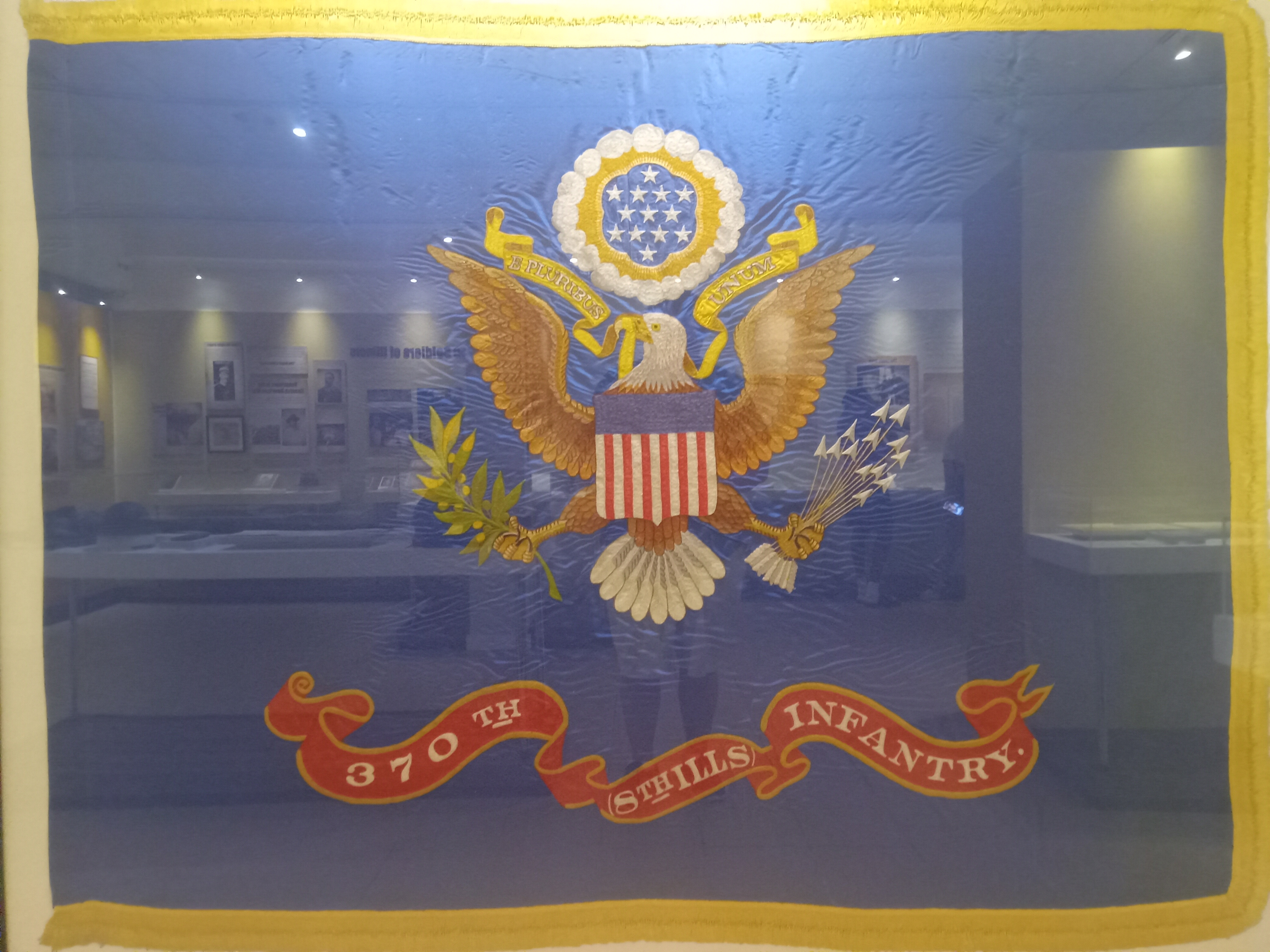
Colors of the 370th, with "(8th ILLS)" in banner fold

The 370th Infantry Regiment was the designation for one of the infantry regiments of the 93rd (Provisional) Infantry Division in World War I. Known as the "Black Devils", for their fierce fighting during the First World War and a segregated unit, it was the only United States Army combat unit with African-American officers.

The regiment initially grew out of the 8th Infantry Regiment, Illinois National Guard (also known as the "Fighting 8th") which saw action in the Spanish American War of 1898, where it first made United States' history with its all-black officer corps. The World War I unit is memorialized by the Victory Monument in Bronzeville, Chicago.

In World War II, a regiment known as the 370th Infantry Regiment was part of the segregated 92nd Infantry Division, but did not perpetuate the lineage of the 8th Illinois or World War I 370th, only sharing its numerical designation.

== 8th Infantry Regiment, Illinois National Guard ==
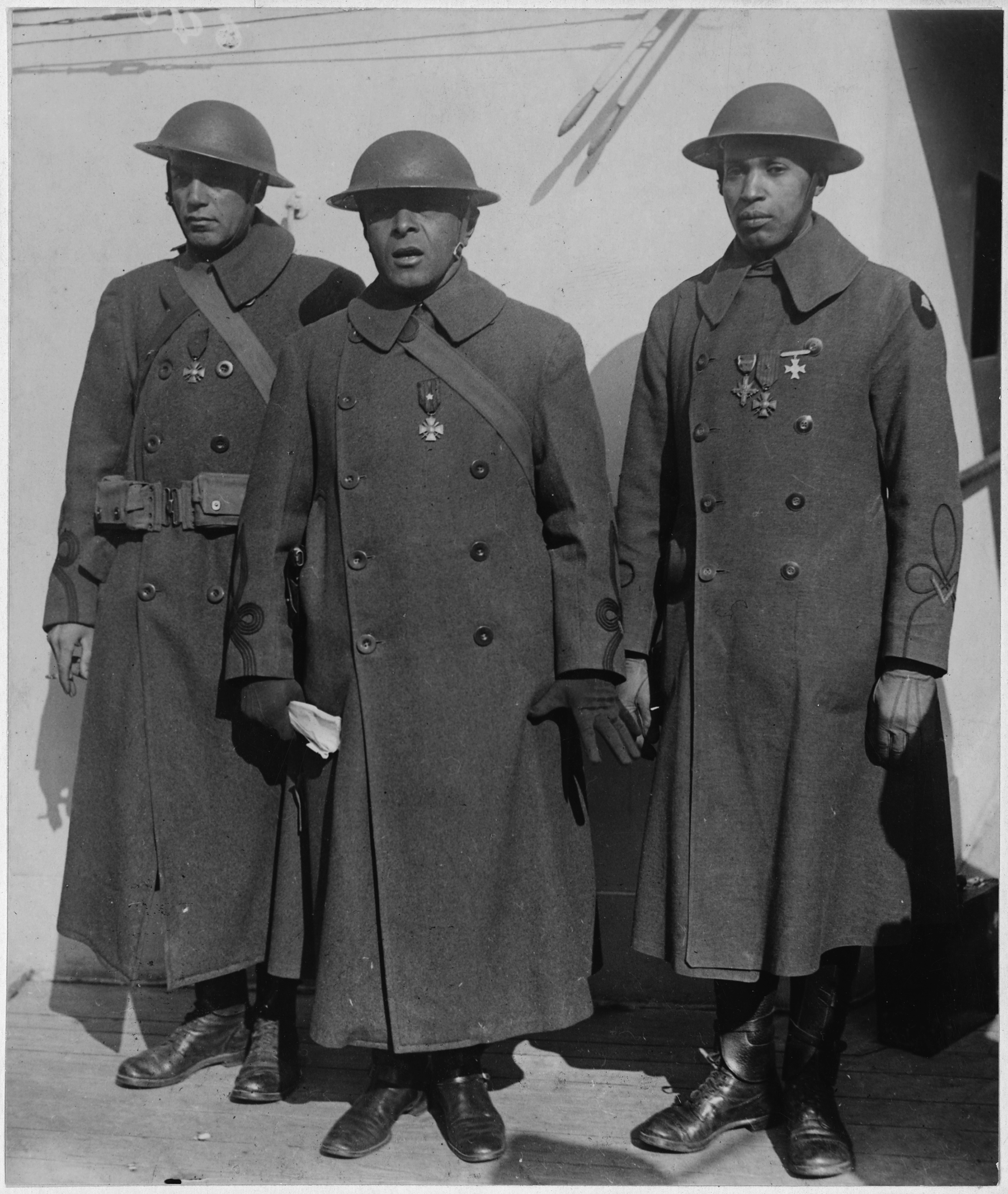
L-R: Major J.R. White; Lieutenant Colonel Otis B. Duncan, highest ranking African American officer in combat for the United States Army; and Lieutenant W.J. Warfield (1919)

The 8th was an all-black militia regiment which was first founded in the 1870s. The unit was reformed in 1898 by the Governor of Illinois for service in the Spanish American War where it first made history for its all-African-American command; the Eighth Illinois was the only regiment in the nation to be commanded by African American officers.

The Eighth Regiment Armory, located in the Black Metropolis-Bronzeville District of Chicago, Illinois, built in 1914, was the first armory in the United States built for an African-American military regiment.

== World War I ==
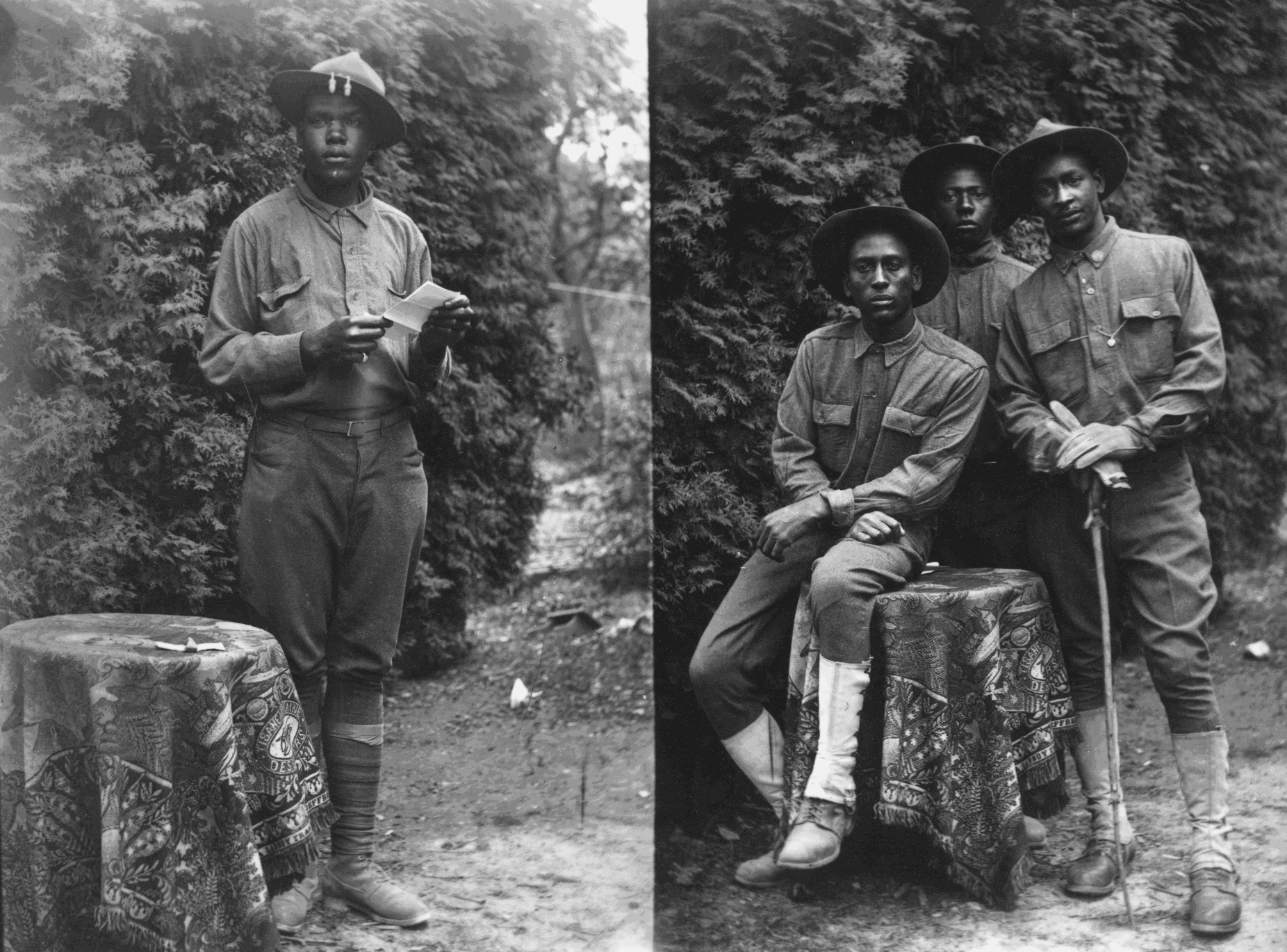
Soldiers of the 370th Infantry Regiment during WWI

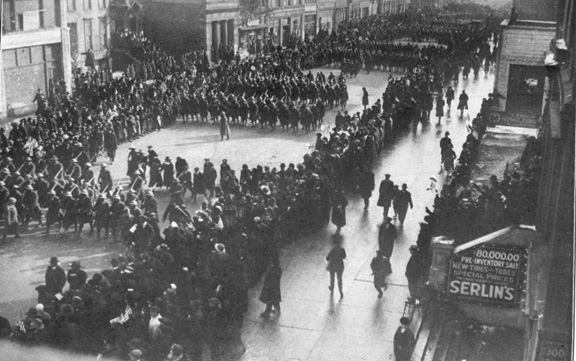
Chicago homecoming of the 370th Regiment (Old 8th Illinois) passing in parade at 13th Street and South Michigan Avenue

On 25 July 1917, the regiment was mustered into service for World War I. The Headquarters, Headquarters Company, Supply Company, Machine Gun Company, Medical Department Detachment, and Companies A through H came from Chicago, Company I came from Springfield (Central Illinois), Company K from Peoria (Northwest-Central Illinois), Company L from Danville (Eastern Illinois), and Company M from Metropolis (Southern Illinois). When the unit was federalized for service during World War I, it was eventually enumerated as the 370th. "In World War I the African American 8th Infantry...fought under the French. As in the late 19th century, it was still the only American unit entirely commanded by black officers."

During World War I, as the 370th Infantry, it served with distinction with the French 34th, 36th, and 59th Infantry Divisions, earning streamers for the battles of Lorraine and Oise-Aisne. Sectors occupied and engagements participated in were Saint Mihiel with the French in 1918, Argonne Forest, St. Gobain Forest, Bois de Mortier, Mont des Signes, Oise-Aisne Canal, Laon, Grandlup, Soissons, and Oise-Aisne and Lorraine offensives. One battalion of the Regiment, under the command of Lieutenant Colonel Otis B. Duncan, was engaged in pursuit of the retreating enemy far in advance, when halted by the Armistice.

For its actions during the war, the members of the 370th received 21 Distinguished Service Crosses, one Distinguished Service Medal and 68 Croix de Guerre. Notably Lt. Col. Otis B. Duncan was awarded a Croix de Guerre of the 370th and was additionally the highest-ranking African-American officer to serve in World War I combat.

For its fierce fighting in the Argonne, the regiment was given the name "Black Devils" (German: Schwarze Teufel) by the Germans. The Victory Monument, created by sculptor Leonard Crunelle, was built to honor the service of Eighth Regiment of the Illinois National Guard during World War I. It is located in the Black Metropolis-Bronzeville District in the Douglas community area of Chicago, Illinois.

== Interwar period ==
The 370th Infantry sailed home on the SS France and was demobilized at 11 March 1919 at Camp Grant, Illinois. It was reorganized as the 8th Infantry Regiment, Illinois National Guard, in 1919-1921, and the regimental headquarters, under the command of Colonel Otis B. Duncan, was federally recognized on 25 August 1921 at Springfield, Illinois. Duncan was succeeded by Colonel Spencer C. Dickerson on 15 November 1929, and Colonel William J. Warfield on 25 February 1935. The regiment was assigned to the General Headquarters Reserve, and its designated mobilization training station was Fort Huachuca, Arizona. On 23 July 1929, the regiment was reassigned to the Second Army. All units of the regiment, save for the headquarters and 3rd Battalion, were located in Chicago. On 1 December 1929, the 3rd Battalion was mustered out of service. The stations of the 3rd Battalion on that date were as follows: Headquarters, Springfield; Headquarters Company, Chicago; Company I, Springfield; Company K, Quincy; Company L, Metropolis; Company M, Peoria. On 1 October 1933, the regimental headquarters was relocated to Chicago. The regiment conducted its summer training at Camp Grant, Illinois. On 6 October 1940, the regiment was converted and redesignated as the 184th Field Artillery Regiment.

Reorganization of 8th Infantry Regiment, 1940
8th Infantry unit	184th Field Artillery unit
Headquarters	Headquarters
Headquarters Company	Headquarters Battery
Medical Department Detachment	Medical Department Detachment
Band	Band
Headquarters, 1st Battalion	Headquarters, 1st Battalion
Headquarters Detachment, 1st Battalion	Headquarters Battery, 1st Battalion
Company A	Battery A
Company B	Battery B
Company C	Battery C
Headquarters, 2nd Battalion	Headquarters, 2nd Battalion
Headquarters Detachment, 2nd Battalion	Headquarters Battery, 2nd Battalion
Company D	Battery D
Company E	Battery E
Company F	Battery F
Company H	Service Battery, 2nd Battalion
Company G	Antitank Battery, 2nd Battalion

== World War II ==
=== 184th Field Artillery Regiment ===
On 6 January 1941, the 184th Field Artillery Regiment was inducted into federal service at Chicago and moved to Fort Custer, Michigan. On 16 January 1943, the regiment was broken up into the 930th and 931st Field Artillery Battalions, and the Headquarters and Headquarters Battery was disbanded. On 28 February 1944, the 930th Field Artillery Battalion was converted and redesignated as the 1699th Engineer Combat Battalion; it was inactivated on 19 June 1945 in Germany. On 20 March 1944, the 931st Field Artillery Battalion was converted and redesignated as the 1698th Engineer Combat Battalion; it was inactivated on 25 September 1945 in Germany.

=== 370th Infantry (Army of the United States) ===
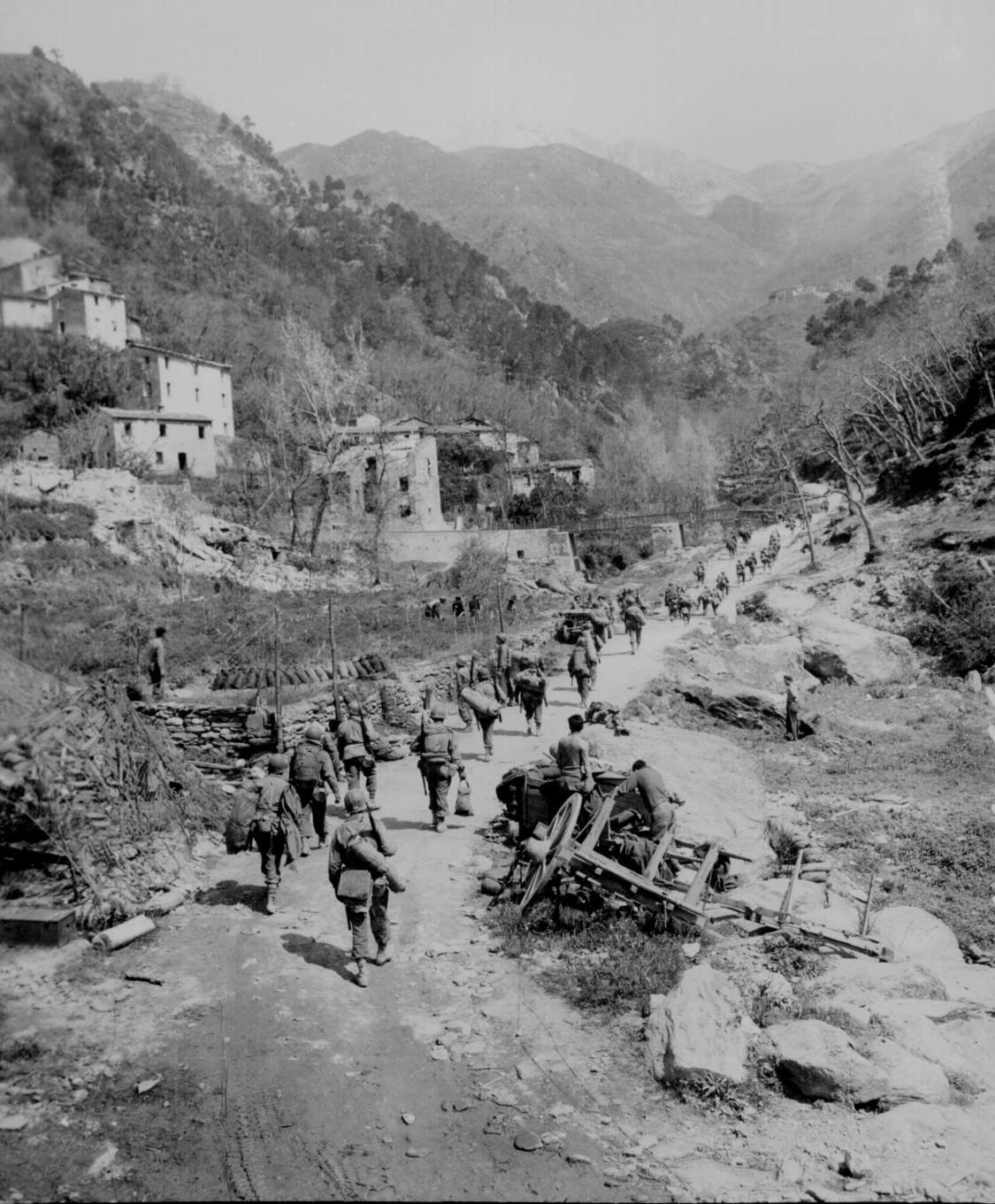
Men of the 370th Infantry Regiment marching through Prato, Italy April 9, 1945.

This second incarnation of the 370th Infantry does not have any lineal relation to the 8th Illinois, World War I 370th Infantry, or subsequent units, but only shares its number. It was activated in October 1942, along with the rest of the 92nd Infantry Division, ten months after the American entry into World War II. After nearly two years of training, it departed the United States in July 1944 and arrived on the Italian Front, landing at Naples on 1 August, attached to the Task Force 42 of the 1st Armored Division. The 370th entered combat on 24 August 1944 as part of the U.S. Fifth Army. It participated in the crossing of the Arno River, the occupation of Lucca and the penetration of the Gothic Line, in the pursuit of an enemy which was retreating from that area. It was later attached to the 92nd Division in Task Force 45, the Fifth Army unit responsible for the Ligurian coastal sector, the left flank of Allied troops in Italy. On 13 October, the remainder of the 92nd Division concentrated for patrol activities. Elements of the 92nd Division moved to the Serchio sector, 3 November, and advanced in the Serchio River Valley against light resistance, but the attempt to capture Castelnuovo did not succeed. Patrol activities continued until 26 December when the enemy attacked (Winter Line), forcing units of the 92nd Division to withdraw. The attack ended on 28 December. The attacking forces were mainly from the Alpine Division "Monte Rosa", a division of the Italian Fascist Army (4 battalions) with the support of 3 German battalions. Aside from patrols and reconnaissance, units of the 92nd attacked in the Serchio sector, 5–8 February 1945, against the Italian Bersaglieri Division "Italia", another unit of the army of the Italian Social Republic, but enemy counterattacks nullified division advances.

On 1 April, the 370th RCT and the attached 442nd Infantry (Nisei) attacked in the Ligurian coastal sector and drove rapidly north against light opposition of German 148th Infantry Division supported by Italian coastal units. The 370th took over the Serchio sector and pursued a retreating enemy from 18 April until the collapse of enemy forces, 29 April 1945. Elements of the 92nd Division entered La Spezia and Genoa on 27 April and took over selected towns along the Ligurian coast until the enemy surrendered, 2 May 1945. Between August 1944 and May 1945 the 92nd Division suffered 3,200 casualties, factoring losses from units attached to the Division brings the totals up to 5,000 casualties.

On the Italian Front, the Buffalo soldiers had an opportunity to make contact with men of many nationalities: beyond other segregated Americans like the Japanese descendants, they had contact with the colonial troops of the British and French overseas empires (Black Africans, Moroccans, Algerians, Indian and Nepali Gurkhas, and others) as well as with exiled Poles, Greeks and Czechs; anti-fascist Italians and the Brazilian Expeditionary Force.

== Postwar to 1947 ==
On 25 August 1945, the Headquarters and Headquarters Battery, 184th Field Artillery Regiment, was reconstituted in the Illinois National Guard. In 1947, elements of the former 184th Field Artillery were converted, reorganized, and redesignated as the 178th Infantry Regiment, with headquarters organized and federally recognized 31 March 1947 at Chicago.

== Notable members ==
World War I

- Charlie Alexander, band sergeant for the 370th in 1917 and later a well-known jazz musician
- George Washington Antione, doctor with the 370th
- Rufus Herve Bacote, doctor with the 370th
- Lieutenant Colonel Otis B. Duncan commanded the 3rd Battalion of the 370th in combat.
- Harry Haywood (6 February 1898 – 1985), later, a leading figure in both the Communist Party of the United States (CPUSA) and the Communist Party of the Soviet Union (CPSU)
- Sergeant Matthew Jenkins received the Distinguished Service Cross and the Croix de Guerre for leading his platoon in combat, taking a German position, and holding it until relieved 36 hours later
- James Alexander Owen, doctor with the 370th
- 1st Lieutenant William J. Powell, engineer and aviation pioneer, was wounded in a gas attack as an infantry officer.

Carter W Wesley 1st lieutenant lead attack when white commanding officer was wounded Battle of assigned to the 370th Infantry Regiment, fought in the battle of Oise-Aisne. Civil Rights Attorney and Newspaper publisher of Freedmans Press and the Houston Informer. Founder of the National Newspaper Publishers Association. NAACP legal defense member, Supreme Court case victory with the SMITH vs. ALLWRIGHT voter suppression case 1948 with Thurgood Marshall

World War II

- Vernon Baker, U.S. Army Medal of Honor recipient
- Marshall Allen, jazz musician and leader of The Sun Ra Arkestra

== See also ==
- Eighth Regiment Armory (Chicago)
- Victory Monument (Chicago)

== Bibliography ==
- Braddan, William S. (1940). Under Three Banners: An Autobiography. National Baptist Pub.
- Braddan, William S. (1994). Under Fire with 370th Infantry (8th I.N.G.), A.E.F. "Lest You Forget" Memoirs of the World War. W. S. Braddan.
- Haywood, Harry. Africana: the encyclopedia of the African and African American experience. Volume 3 (2nd ed.). Oxford University Press, 2005. ISBN 9780195170559
- Hill, Jim (July 1970). "The 370th Infantry, Chicago's 8th Illinois National Guard in WWI". Camaraderie: The Journal of the United States Branch, Western Front Association. 6: 4–11.
- Motley, Mary Penick. The Invisible Soldier: The Experience of the Black Soldier, World War II. Wayne State University Press, 1975 ISBN 0814319610
