= Armored group (military unit) =

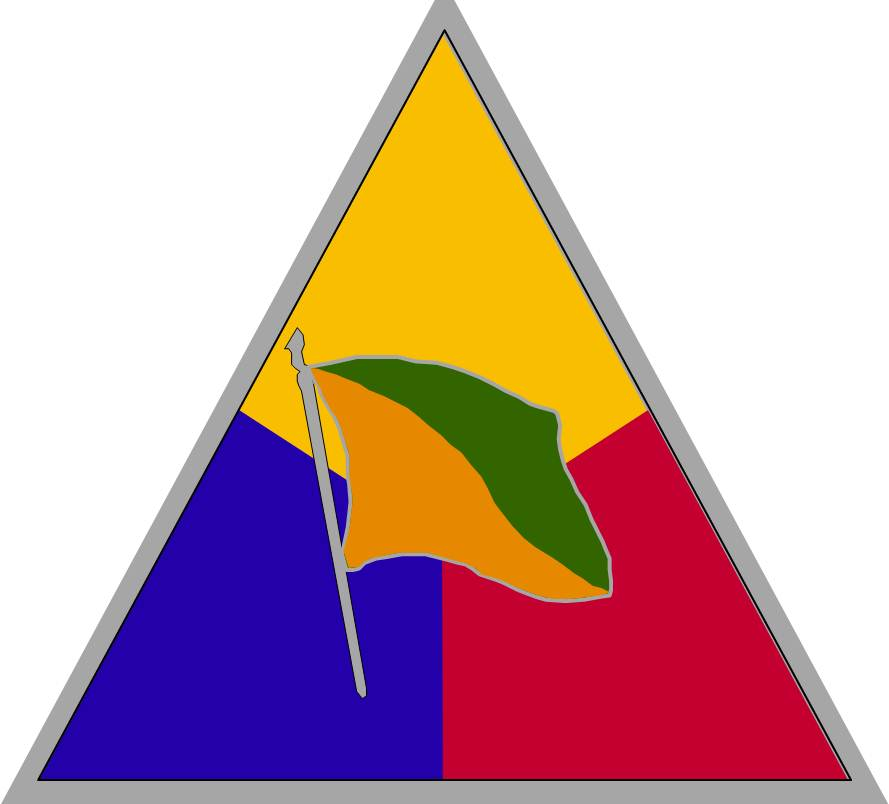
Distinctive unit insignia for U.S. Army armored groups during World War II. The group's numerical designation would be superimposed on the flag in the middle of the insignia.

An Armored group was a command and control headquarters in the United States Army equivalent to the headquarters of an armored division combat command during World War II. Most armored groups served in the European Theater of Operations (ETO). Typically an armored group was attached to each American corps in the European Theater of Operations.

== Organization ==
As organized under the 2 October 1943 table of organization, the armored group consisted of a headquarters and a headquarters company totaling 15 officers, 1 warrant officer, and 81 enlisted men. Without any significant organization changes, the total strength was increased to 17 officers, 1 warrant officer, and 88 enlisted men when the table of organization was updated on 11 November 1944.

- The headquarters consisted of the commander, normally a full colonel, his executive officer, a lieutenant colonel, and the group staff, which consisted of six officers.
- The headquarters company consisted of the following sections:

- Headquarters section – commanded by a captain, with 6 enlisted men.
- Maintenance Section – 1 officer and 8 enlisted men
- Administrative Mess & Supply Section – 15 enlisted men, including the company first sergeant.
- Liaison Section – 9 enlisted men
- Tank Platoon – 1 lieutenant and 9 enlisted men. The tank platoon also included 3 light tanks, normally M5 Stuarts.
- Staff Section – 1 warrant officer, 2 master sergeants, and 30 additional enlisted men.

In addition, the group was authorized 2 attached chaplains, and 2 medical officers with 2 enlisted dental technicians.

== World War II ==
An armored group was intended to supervise independent tank battalions within a corps area. However, these separate tank battalions were normally attached to an infantry division. Therefore, the armored group headquarters did not end up being in the chain of command or administration for the tank battalions which were nominally assigned to it. The corps commander would use the "surplus" group commander and staff as a special staff section for armor. The group's vehicles were used for liaison and to supplement communications with the combat units.

The armored groups were frequently assigned contingency or emergency missions as a task force headquarters. However, the troops required for such missions were only assigned or attached on order, thus rarely was the task force actually activated or employed. Two notable exceptions were the 3rd Armored Group as it assaulted the Siegfried Line in western Germany from 17 to 30 September 1944, and the 17th Armored Group, which was formed of units assigned or attached to the 76th Infantry Division for an attack across the Kyll River in Germany from 4 to 9 March 1945.

In the Pacific Theater of Operations (PTO), the 20th Armored Group played a significant role in provisioning and preparing the amphibious tank and tractor battalions used for the landings on Leyte, Luzon and Okinawa. As in Europe, the staff served as a special staff section to the corps headquarters.

Because the armored group was largely superfluous to the combat mission, the group headquarters was sometimes tasked for other purposes. These included the operation of corps rest centers and rear area defenses, administering provisional military government, and supervising special equipment schools such as mine exploders and flame thrower tanks.

By the fall of 1944, it was acknowledged that American armored divisions lacked sufficient personnel to operate their Combat Command Reserve headquarters as full combat commands, while at the same time the armored groups were underutilized. On 28 October 1944, the headquarters of 3rd Armored Group was split, with a small section of about 30 men attached to the corps staff. The remainder of the group was attached to the 5th Armored Division. By war’s end, this practice had become the norm in the ETO.

Based on experiences in both the European and Pacific theaters, the Army recognized that retention of armored groups was no longer justified and the unit type was eliminated.

Unit	History	Campaign Participation & Unit Awards (Note: Except as noted, participation is as reflected in Department of the Army Pamphlet 672-1)
1st Armored Group	ETO. Activated as the 1st Tank Group at Fort Knox, Kentucky on 11 February 1941. Departed New York on 31 August 1942 and arrived in England on 5 Sep 1942. Arrived in North Africa on 17 January 1943, and arrived in Italy on 27 October 1943. Redesignated 1st Armored Group in Italy on 19 March 1944. Participated in the campaign in southern France beginning on 23 September 1944, where it functioned as the armored section for VI Corps. The group was inactivated at Marseille, France on 20 September 1945.	Naples-Foggia, Rome-Arno, Rhineland, Ardennes-Alsace, Central Europe
2nd Armored Group	ETO. Activated at Camp Bowie, Texas as the 2nd Tank Group on 1 March 1942. Departed New York on 5 March 1943 and arrived in North Africa on 18 March 1943. The unit arrived in Italy on 26 November 1943 and was redesignated 2nd Armored Group on 19 March 1944 at Roccarainola, Italy. The unit operated as a combat armored group in Italy and was attached to Task Force 45 (45th AAA Brigade) on 26 July 1944. The 2nd Armored Group was disbanded at Montecatini, Italy on 19 December and reconstituted as HHC, 473rd Infantry Regiment.	Naples-Foggia, North Apennines, and Rome-Arno Campaigns French Croix de Guerre
3rd Armored Group	ETO. Activate 1 March 1942 at Fort Lewis, Washington as the 3rd Tank Group. Departed New York on 21 October 1943 and arrived in England on 2 November. Redesignated as 3rd Armored Group at East Allington, Devon, England, on 4 January 1944. Elements of the 3rd Armored Group went ashore at Normandy on 6 June 1944. Functioned as the armored section at V Corps. Inactivated in Germany on 30 September 1945.	Normandy, Northern France, Ardennes-Alsace, Rhineland, and Central Europe Elements of the group were awarded the Presidential Unit Citation for action from 29 November – 8 December 1944.
4th Armored Group	PTO. Activated in Hawaii as the 4th Tank Group (Light). Redesignated as the 4th Armored Group on 25 November 1943. While in Hawaii, trained, prepared, and rehabilitated tank and amphibious units for operations in the Pacific theater. Departed Hawaii on 22 June 1945 and arrived at Leyte, The Philippines on 11 July 1945. Arrived in San Francisco on 11 January 1946 and inactivated at Camp Stoneman, California on 12 January 1946.	Pacific Theater, without inscription.
5th Armored Group	Activated on 23 May 1942 as the 5th Tank Group (Colored) at Camp Claiborne, Louisiana, and moved to Camp Hood, Texas, on 15 September 1943, and assigned to the Tank Destroyer Center. Redesignated as the 5th Armored Group (Colored) on 22 November 1943. Inactivated on 1 December 1944. Formed of the 758th, 761st, and 784th Tank Battalions.	
6th Armored Group	ETO. Activated at Camp Bowie, Texas on 23 April 1942 as the 6th Tank Group. Departed New York on 8 January 1944 and arrived in England on 17 January 1944. Redesignated 6th Armored Group on 1 February 1944 at Littlehampton, England. Participated int Normandy landings on D-Day, 6 June 1944.	Normandy (with Arrowhead), Northern France, Ardennes-Alsace, Rhineland, and Central Europe
7th Armored Group	ETO. Activated 2 July 1942 at Camp Hood, Texas ss the 7th Tank Group. Redesignated 7th Armored Group at Camp Bowie, Texas on 15 December 1943. Departed New York on 1 March 1944 and arrived in England on 7 March 1944. Arrived in France on 3 July, and was detailed as the armor section of the XIX Corps headquarters. Crossed into Belgium of 3 September 1944, and into Holland on 20 September 1944. Restructured as the Ninth Army Rest Area Headquarters on 10 March 1945 and entered Germany on 12 April 1945. Arrived in Boston, Massachusetts on 25 November 1945 and was inactivated at Camp Myles Standish the following day.	Normandy, Northern France, Ardennes-Alsace, and Rhineland
8th Armored Group	ETO. Activated as the 8th tank Group in Camp Rucker, Alabama. Arrived at Camp Shelby, Mississippi on 4 November 1943, where it was redesignated the 8th Armored Group on 2 December 1943. Departed New York on 11 February 1944 and arrived in England on 23 February 1944. Landed in France on 31 July 1944, where it functioned as the armored section in the XX Corps Headquarters. Entered Luxembourg on 28 December 1944 and crossed into Germany on 27 March 1945. Arrived in Boston on 25 November 1945 and inactivated at Camp Myles Standish the following day.	Northern France, Ardennes-Alsace, and Central Europe
9th Armored Group	ETO. Activated 10 September 1942 as the 9th Tank Group at Camp Campbell, Kentucky. Moved to the Desert Training Center, Arizona on 19 August 1943, where it was redesignated 9th Armored Group on 8 December 1943. Departed New York on 31 March 1944 and arrived in England on 6 April 1944. Landed in France on 12 November 1944. Entered Belgium on 10 December 1944 and committed to combat on 18 December 1944. Moved into Germany on 13 February 1945. Withdrawn from the line and served as the armored section in the XVIII Corps Headquarters beginning on 19 February 1945. Inactivated in Germany on 24 October 1945.	Ardennes-Alsace, Rhineland, and Central Europe
10th Armored Group	ETO. Activated 1 March 1943 as the 10th Tank Group at Fort Lewis, Washington. Redesignated as the 10the Armored Group at the Desert Training Center on 9 December 1943. Departed New York on 26 July 1944 and arrived in England on 5 August 1944. Landed in France on 29 August 1944. Attached as the Headquarters for Combat Command Reserve (CCR)), 8th Armored Division and committed to combat on 18 January 1945. Entered Holland on 8 February 1945 and crossed into Germany on 1 March 1945. The unit was inactivated in Germany on 1 May 1946.	Northern France, Ardennes-Alsace, Rhineland, and Central Europe
11th Armored Group	ETO. Activated 28 July 1943 as the 11th Tank Group at Camp Campbell, Kentucky. Redesignated the 11 Armored Group on 5 December 1943. Departed Boston 28 February 1944 and arrived in England on 8 March 1944. Landed in France on 1i July 1944. Committed to combat on 31 July 1944 and crossed into Germany on 19 March 1945. The unit was inactivated in Germany on 1 May 1946.	Normandy, Northern France, Ardennes-Alsace, Rhineland, and Central Europe Credit for Occupation of Germany, 2 May – 4 September 1945
12th Armored Group	ETO. Originally activated at Camp Chaffee, Arkansas on 31 March 1943 as the 3rd Armored Group. Redesignated 12th Tank Group on 14 September 1943 and moved to Camp Howze, Texas with X Corps. Redesignated at Camp Howze as the 12th Armored Group on 13 December 1943. Assigned to XVIII Corps on 10 January 1944, then to XVIII Corps on 1 February 1944. Departed Boston on 4 October 1944 and arrived in England on 12 October 1944. Arrived in France on 15 October 1944, and designated to function as CCR, 9th Armored Division. Entered Luxembourg on 2 December 1944, and into Belgium on 19 December 1944. Entered Germany on 31 March 1945. Returned to the United States at New York on 1 July 1945, and moved to Camp Gruber, Oklahoma. Inactivated at Camp Gruber on 20 October 1945.	Ardennes-Alsace, Rhineland, and Central Europe The Headquarters Company received the Presidential Unit Citation for action from 18–27 December 1944.
13th Armored Group	PTO. Activated a Fort Lewis, Washington on 1 November 1943 under IV Corps. Moved to Fort Ord, California 21 February 1943 and assigned to III Corps. Departed San Francisco 21 October 1944, and arrived in New Guinea on 12 November 9144. Landed in the Philippine Islands on 11 January 1945. Returned to San Francisco on 10 January 1946 and inactivate at Camp Stoneman, California on 12 January 1946.	Luzon
14th Armored Group	Activated at Fort Jackson, South Carolina on 28 October 1943 under XII Corps. Moved to Fort Campbell, Kentucky on 24 March 1944 and assigned to XXIII Corps. Moved to Fort Knox, Kentucky on 19 September 1944 with the Replacement & School Command. Inactivated at Fort Knox on 10 March 1945.	
15th Armored Group	Activated at Camp Rucker, Alabama on 28 October 1943 under III Corps. Arrived at Fort Jackson, South Carolina on 29 February 1944 and assigned to XXIII Corps. Inactivated at Fort Jackson on 23 February 1946.	
16th Armored Group	Activated at Camp Pickett, Virginia on 8 November 1943 under XIII Corps and moved to Camp Chaffee, Arkansas 28 February 1944 under XVI Corps. Moved to Camp Phillips, Kansas on 14 April 1944 and assigned to XXXVI Corps on 17 July 1944. Transferred to Camp Carson, Colorado on 2 August 1944. Inactivated at Camp Carson on 11 September 1944.	
17th Armored Group	ETO. Activated at Fort Knox, Kentucky on 20 March 1943 as the 1st Armored Group. Redesignated as 17th Armored Group on 20 November 1944. Staged at Camp Kilmer, New Jersey on 2 April 1944, and departed New York on 20 April 1944, and arrived in England on 26 April 1944. Landed in France on 5 August 1944 and went into combat on 113 August 1944. Functioned as the armored section in the XII Corps headquarters. Crossed into Luxembourg on 21 December 1944 and entered Germany on 3 March 1945. Inactivated in Belgium on 30 April 1946.	Northern France, Ardennes-Alsace, Rhineland, and Central Europe
18th Armored Group	Activated 23 March 1943 at Camp Cooke, California under the Armored Force and assigned to II Armored Corps on 31 March 1943. Moved to Fort Ord, California on 20 October 1943 and attached to Fourth Army. Redesignated as the 18th Armored Group on 30 November 1943. Assigned to III Corps on 15 January 1944, then to XXXVI Corps on 4 July 1945. Inactivated at Fort Ord on 27 November 1945.	
19th Armored Group	PTO. Activated at Kaiaka Bay Camp, Hawaii in August 1944, from officers of the 715th Amphibious Tractor Battalion. The group conducted amphibious tractor training and maintenance for the Central Pacific Base Command. Inactivated 10 April 1945 without deploying from Hawaii.	Pacific Theater without inscription.
20th Armored Group	PTO. Established as the Provisional Armored Group on 7 June 1944 at Schofield Barracks, Hawaii and assigned to XXIV Corps. Redesignated 20th Armored Group on 26 August 1944. Departed Hawaii on 15 September 1944 and landed at Leyte, Philippines on 21 October 1944, and attached to XXIV Corps. Assaulted Okinawa on 1 April 1945. Inactivated in Korea on 8 June 1946.	Occupation credit for Okinawa, 15 September – 4 December 1945, and Korea, 5 December 1945 – 20 January 1946. The group headquarters received assault landing credit for Leyte and Okinawa, and was awarded the Philippine Republic Presidential Unit Citation for action between 17 Oct 1944 to 4 July 1945.

== Cold War ==
HHT, 11th Tank Group was reorganized and redesignated as HHC, 11th Armored Group on 5 December 1943. During the war, armored groups such as the 11th were used as administrative headquarters for the numerous independent tank battalions fighting in Europe. HHC, 11th Armored Group was converted and redesignated HHT, 1st Constabulary Regiment on 1 May 1946. HHT, 1st Constabulary Regiment was inactivated on 20 September 1947 in Germany.

On 1 October 1953, the newly formed 19th Armor Group (19th AG), headquartered at Frankfurt, was assigned to V Corps. 19th AG was the size of a large brigade, with three tank battalions and one mechanized infantry battalion stationed from Mannheim to Wildflecken. The 19th AG was replaced by the 4th Armor Group on 1 July 1955 (the 4th AG was approximately the size of the replaced 19th AG); the 4th Armor Group was deactivated in the 1963 Reorganization Objective Army Division reorganization.
