= Paul L. Bates =

American army officer (1908–1995)

- Born: Paul Levern Bates; March 4, 1908; Los Angeles, California, U.S.
- Died: February 21, 1995 (aged 86); Dunedin, Florida, U.S.
- Burial place: Arlington National Cemetery
- Military career
- Allegiance: United States of America
- Branch: United States Army
- Service years: 1931–1963
- Rank: Colonel
- Commands: 761st Tank Battalion
- Conflicts: World War II; Korean War; Vietnam War
- Awards: Silver Star; Legion of Merit; Bronze Star Medal (2); Purple Heart

Paul Levern Bates (March 4, 1908 – February 21, 1995) was a United States Army officer. He served a distinguished and decorated career in the Army, which most notably included commanding the first black tank battalion to enter combat in World War II. He also became well known as the white colonel who refused to court-martial future Baseball Hall of Famer Jackie Robinson.

== Early life ==
Bates was born in Los Angeles, California and graduated in 1931 from Western Maryland College, now McDaniel College, where he was a star football player and a member of the Reserve Officers Training Corps. Before being called to active duty in the Army as a first lieutenant in February 1941, Bates worked as a high school football coach and a teacher.

== World War II ==
In January 1943, then Lieutenant Colonel Bates took command of the 761st Tank Battalion, all of whose enlisted men were black. The unit’s distinctive unit insignia had an image of a black panther head.

When the unit completed training in rigidly segregated boot camps in Louisiana and Texas, Bates refused a promotion from lieutenant colonel that would have separated him from what he regarded as one of the best tank battalions in the Army. He was eventually promoted to colonel.

While in Texas, Bates refused to court-martial a black officer who had refused to move to the rear of a bus at Fort Hood. That officer was Jackie Robinson, who was subsequently court-martialed for insubordination but not convicted. Robinson, who would go on to break the color barrier in Major League Baseball by signing with the Brooklyn Dodgers, praised Bates in his autobiography for his fairness and good judgment.

The 761st entered combat in November 1944 as part of General George S. Patton's Third Army and fought for 183 consecutive days without relief, according to David Williams, a battalion veteran and the author of the novel Hit Hard. The battalion fought in France and then Germany, where it pierced the Siegfried Line, and in Belgium, where it fought the Germans in the Battle of the Bulge. The 761st also fought in Luxembourg and Austria. In all, the 761st Tank Battalion went from Vic-sur-Seille, France, to the Enns River in Steyr, Austria, where it linked up with the Soviet Army. The 761st inflicted thousands of casualties on the enemy and captured, destroyed or liberated more than 30 major towns, four airfields, three ammunition-supply dumps, 461 wheeled vehicles, 34 tanks, 113 large guns and a radio station.

Ironically, Bates was the first member of the 761st to be wounded. Among its 687 enlisted men and 41 officers, 276 received the Purple Heart for wounds in action and 36 died in combat. During World War II, Bates was awarded the Silver Star and two Bronze Stars, in addition to the Purple Heart. In 1963, he was awarded the Legion of Merit when he retired from the Army, having served in combat commands in Europe, at the Command and General Staff College in Fort Leavenworth, Kansas, and at the Pentagon.

In 1978, after a 33-year struggle by the unit's veterans, President Jimmy Carter awarded the 761st a Presidential Unit Citation "for extraordinary heroism in action".

== Later years ==
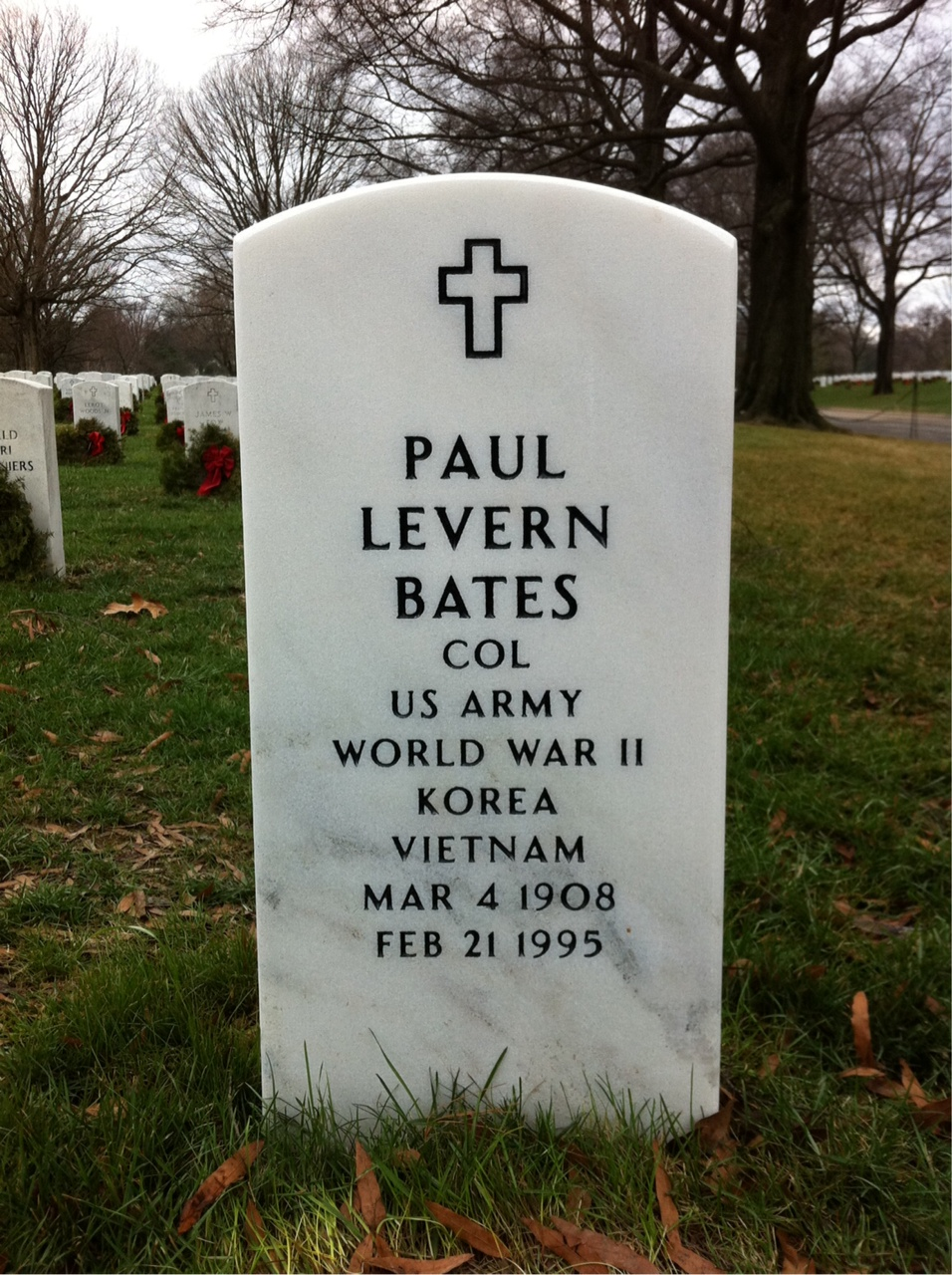
Bates' grave at Arlington National Cemetery

Following his retirement, Colonel Bates remained in close touch with the veterans of the 761st and their families, attending yearly reunions and establishing a scholarship at McDaniel College for lineal descendants of the battalion members who served the unit from August 1944 through April 1945. The Paul L. Bates Memorial Scholarship Fund was established in 1999 under the terms of his will, and is administered and maintained by the Board of Trustees of McDaniel College in Westminster, Maryland.

In 1993, the 761st made news because of a PBS documentary, Liberators: Fighting on Two Fronts in World War II, in which two of its former enlisted men said the battalion had participated in the liberation of the Dachau and Buchenwald concentration camps. But Colonel Bates, along with other officers, noted that the unit was spread over a 50-mile front supporting the 71st Infantry Division at the time and would not confirm the claim. The unit did, however, liberate Gunskirchen, a subcamp of the Mauthausen complex.

Colonel Bates was buried at Arlington National Cemetery in Virginia on March 1, 1995, with full military honors. His wife, Taffy Bates, died in Florida, Sunday, October 19, 2014. She was 96. Born Helen Rosen in Queens, New York, "Taffy," a name she fashioned for herself, volunteered for duty as an Army nurse during World War II.

== See also ==
- Jackie Robinson
