= 5th Armored Group (United States) =

The 5th Armored Group was an all-black segregated armored formation that served in World War II. The 5th was the only segregated armored group formed during the war and one of only two armored groups that did not deploy, although its assigned tank battalions all saw combat in the European Theater of Operations.

The 5th Armored Group was activated on 23 May 1942. It was composed of the 758th Tank Battalion (Light), 761st Tank Battalion (Medium) and 784th Tank Battalion (Medium).

The 5th Armored Group was commanded by Colonel LeRoy Nichols. However, the assigned battalions deployed individually to Europe where they were attached to various divisions to meet operational requirements. The formation existed as a "paper" headquarters at Camp Claiborne, Louisiana, and Fort Huachuca, Arizona, and was inactivated on 1 December 1944.
