= Ruben Rivers =

United States Army Medal of Honor recipient

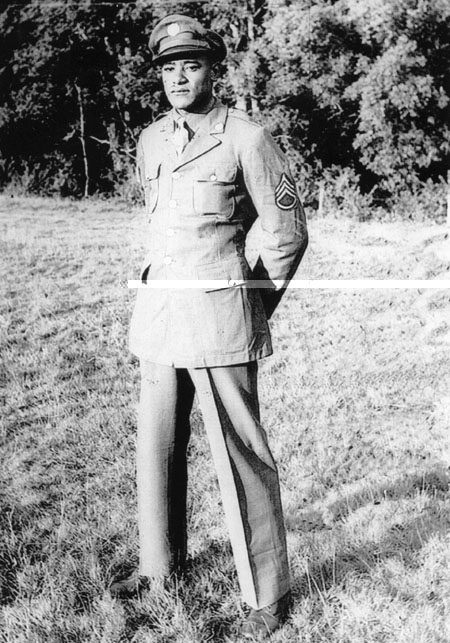
- Staff Sergeant Ruben Rivers
- Born: October 31, 1918; Tecumseh, Oklahoma, US
- Died: November 19, 1944 (aged 26) near Guebling, German-occupied France †
- Burial place: Lorraine American Cemetery and Memorial, France
- Military career
- Allegiance: United States
- Branch: United States Army
- Service years: 1942–1944
- Rank: Staff sergeant
- Units: 761st Tank Battalion, 26th Infantry Division
- Conflicts: World War II; Battle of Metz
- Awards: Medal of Honor; Silver Star; Purple Heart

Ruben Rivers (October 31, 1918 – November 19, 1944) was a United States Army staff sergeant who was killed in action while serving as a tank company platoon sergeant during World War II. In 1997, he was awarded the Medal of Honor, the nation's highest military decoration for valor, for his actions on November 16–19, 1944, near Bourgaltroff, France.

Rivers (half-Cherokee) and six other Black Americans who served in World War II, were awarded the Medal of Honor on January 12, 1997. The Medal of Honor was posthumously presented to family members of Rivers by President Bill Clinton on January 13, 1997, during a ceremony for the seven recipients at the White House in Washington, D.C. The seven recipients are the first and only Black Americans to be awarded the Medal of Honor for World War II.

== Biography ==
Rivers was born to Willie and Lillian Rivers October 31, 1918 in Tecumseh, Oklahoma. He grew up in nearby Hotulka, Oklahoma, where he and his eleven brothers and sisters worked on the family farm. In 1930, the family moved to Earlsboro. After graduating from high school, Rivers worked on the railroad for a time. At the time, he was 6 ft 2 inches tall.

=== Military service ===
With the United States' entry into World War II on behalf of the Allied cause, Rivers and two of his brothers joined the armed forces. Ruben would be the only one assigned to a combat unit however, training with the 761st Tank Battalion at Camp Hood in Texas. The 761st Tank Battalion, nicknamed the "Black Panthers", was eventually assigned to General George S. Patton's U.S. Third Army, where they performed with distinction in a number of important battles, although Patton did not officially recognize their accomplishments.

Rivers, a tank platoon sergeant in Able Company, 761st Tank Battalion, would play a critical role in some of the earliest action the 761st would see, becoming the battalion's initial hero, but also one of its first casualties. Shortly after arriving in Europe in the fall of 1944, the 761st was chosen by General Patton to be part of his Saar Campaign in the Allied drive to the Siegfried Line. On November 8, 1944, Able Company, 761st Tank Battalion, which was attached to the 26th Infantry Division, joined with the 104th Infantry, 26th infantry Division, in an attack on German positions near Vic-sur-Seille in northeastern France. As they approached the town via a narrow road, a roadblock improvised by the Germans using a fallen tree and several mines stopped the progress of the tanks and infantry. The Germans soon trained their mortar and rifle fire on infantrymen stranded in the roadside ditches, and the situation threatened to produce heavy casualties very quickly. Rivers, positioned in "A" Company's lead tank, realized that following protocol would fail to alleviate the situation. Instead he took action that resulted in him being the 761st's first Silver Star recipient. His heroic efforts are recounted below in the official medal citation:

During the daylight attack ... Staff Sergeant Rivers, a tank platoon sergeant, was in the lead tank when a road block was encountered which held up the advance. With utter disregard for his personal safety, Staff Sergeant Rivers courageously dismounted from his tank in the face of directed enemy small arms fire, attached a cable to the road block and moved it off the road, thus permitting the combat team to proceed. His prompt action thus prevented a serious delay in the offensive action and was instrumental in the successful assault and capture of the town. His brilliant display of initiative, courage and devotion to duty reflect the highest credit upon Staff Sergeant Rivers and the armed forces of the United States.

Unfortunately, the medal would have to be awarded posthumously. A little more than a week later Rivers would again distinguish himself leading the platoon, but this time he himself would not be so fortunate. On November 16, Able Company, with Rivers in the lead tank, would lead another assault. This time the target was German positions in Guebling. On the way into the town, Rivers' tank hit a mine, disabling it and leaving Rivers with a significant injury. Shrapnel had cut his leg from knee to thigh and as deep as the bone. His company commander, Captain David J. Williams, later remembered what happened when he and the rest of "A" Company came to aid Rivers:

With the morphine needle in my right hand about a half inch from Sergeant Rivers' leg, I could have told my sergeant to hold him down. I said, "Ruben, you're going back. You've got a million-dollar wound. You're going back to Tecumseh. You're getting out of this. You got a Silver Star and a Purple Heart." He says, "Captain, you're going to need me." I said, "I'm giving you a direct order! You're going back!" I said, "Medics, get the stretcher." He pushed the needle away and got up. He said, "This is one order, the only order I'll ever disobey."

Allowing the medics to only clean and dress the wound, Rivers took command of another tank and, as the Germans had begun to mark the area for heavy artillery fire, moved to take cover with the rest of "A" Company. It would not be until the morning of November 19 that the 761st would again push forward, but by now Rivers' condition had seriously deteriorated. A dangerous infection had developed, threatening the loss of life and limb, and the wound was visibly causing a great deal of pain. Rivers had been urged to evacuate the night before, but he had again refused to leave the field. As usual his tank led the way, but while advancing toward German positions near the town of Bougaltroff, "A" Company "came under extraordinarily heavy fire. Williams ordered the remaining tanks to pull back, but Rivers had located the German anti-tank unit and, with one other tank, moved to fire on the area and cover the withdrawal. In the process, Rivers was fully exposed, and the Germans quickly trained their fire on his tank, landing two direct hits with high-explosive shells. Rivers was killed instantly. Captain Williams recommended Rivers for the Medal of Honor.

=== Medal of Honor ===
Rivers' final acts, which demonstrated a profound loyalty to his fellow soldiers and dedication to the war effort, earned him the military's highest award, the Medal of Honor. However, although Captain Williams recommended Rivers for the decoration on November 20, 1944, it would not come until more than fifty years later. Rivers' story is indicative of the lack of recognition that was afforded to Black American soldiers who served during World War II. Of the 433 Medals of Honor awarded to World War II servicemen, none went to a black American, although over a million served in the armed forces. On January 13, 1997, some of these omissions were rectified:

In the early 1990s, it was determined Black American soldiers had been denied consideration for the Medal of Honor in World War II because of their race. In 1993, the U.S. Army had contracted Shaw University in Raleigh, North Carolina, to research and determine if there was racial disparity in the review process for recipients of the Medal of Honor (MOH). The study commissioned by the U.S. Army, described systematic racial discrimination in the criteria for awarding decorations during World War II. After an exhaustive review of files, the study recommended in 1996 that Rivers, and nine Black Americans from World War II, be awarded the MOH. In October of that year, Congress passed legislation that would allow President Bill Clinton to award the Medal of Honor to these World War II soldiers. Seven of the ten including Rivers were approved, and awarded the MOH (six had their Distinguished Service Crosses revoked and upgraded to the MOH) on January 12, 1997. On January 13, 1997, President Bill Clinton presented the MOH to the seven Black Americans; Staff Sergeant Rivers and five others were posthumously presented the medal. Rivers' sister, Grace Woodfork, received her brother's MOH in his stead from Clinton during the ceremony. Vernon Baker was the only living recipient of the medal at the time.

=== Other honors ===
Rivers received the following namings and honors:

- Staff Sergeant Rivers Court in El Paso, Texas is named after Rivers.
- Rivers Barracks, Giessen Germany. Nicknamed "The Zoo"
- Oklahoma Military Hall of Fame
- The section of State Highway 9 from Skagg City Road east to the intersection of State Highway 9-A in Pottawatomie County was designated the "U.S. Army Staff Sergeant Ruben Rivers Highway" in 2008. It runs by the house where he was born. Okla. Stat. tit. 69 § 1698.36

== Medal of Honor citation ==
Rivers' Medal of Honor citation reads:

The President of the United States in the name of The Congress takes pride in presenting the Medal of Honor posthumously to

Staff Sergeant Ruben Rivers
United States Army

Citation:

For conspicuous gallantry and intrepidity at the risk of his life above and beyond the call of duty: Staff Sergeant Rivers distinguished himself by extraordinary heroism in action during 16–19 November 1944, while serving with Company A, 761st Tank Battalion. On 16 November 1944, while advancing toward the town of Guebling, France, Staff Sergeant Rivers' tank hit a mine at a railroad crossing. Although severely wounded, his leg slashed to the bone, Staff Sergeant Rivers declined an injection of morphine, refused to be evacuated, took command of another tank, and advanced with his company into Guebling the next day. Repeatedly refusing evacuation, Staff Sergeant Rivers continued to direct his tank's fire at enemy positions beyond the town through the morning of 19 November 1944. At dawn that day, Company A's tanks advanced toward Bourgaltroff, their next objective, but were stopped by enemy fire. Captain David J. Williams, the Company Commander, ordered his tanks to withdraw and take cover. Staff Sergeant Rivers, however, radioed that he had spotted the German antitank positions: "I see 'em. We'll fight 'em!" Staff Sergeant Rivers, joined by another Company A tank, opened fire on enemy tanks, covering Company A as they withdrew. While doing so, Staff Sergeant Rivers' tank was hit, killing him and wounding the rest of the crew. Staff Sergeant Rivers' fighting spirit and daring leadership were an inspiration to his unit and exemplify the highest traditions of military service.

/S/ Bill Clinton

== Awards and decorations ==

1st row	Medal of Honor Retroactively Awarded, 1997		
2nd row	Silver Star	Purple Heart	Army Good Conduct Medal
3rd row	American Campaign Medal	European–African–Middle Eastern Campaign Medal with 1 Campaign star	World War II Victory Medal
Unit awards	Presidential Unit Citation Retroactively Awarded, 1978		

== See also ==
- Vernon Baker
- Edward A. Carter Jr.
- John R. Fox
- Willy F. James Jr.
- Charles L. Thomas
- George Watson
- List of Medal of Honor recipients
- List of Medal of Honor recipients for World War II
- List of African-American Medal of Honor recipients
