= Bill Miles =

American filmmaker

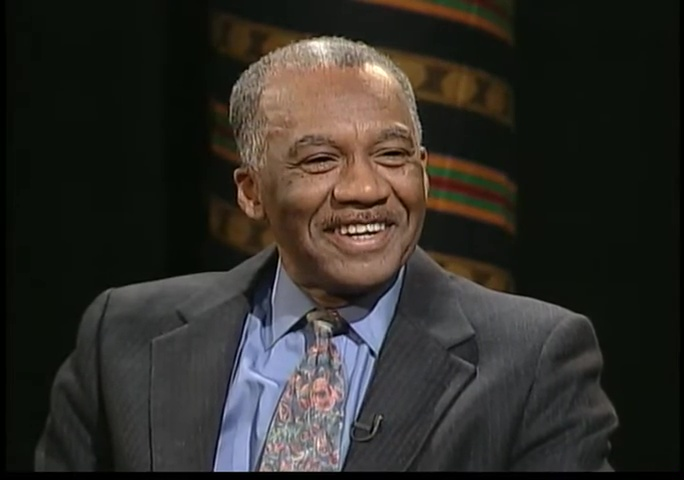
- Miles on CUNY TV's African American Legends, 1999
- Born: William Miles; April 18, 1931; Harlem, New York, U.S.
- Died: May 12, 2013 (aged 82); Queens, New York

William Miles (April 18, 1931 - May 12, 2013) was an American filmmaker. Born in Harlem, New York, he used his deep knowledge and experience of that iconic neighborhood to produce films that tell unique and often inspiring stories of Harlem's history. Based at Thirteen/WNET in New York City, William Miles produced many films dedicated to the African-American experience that have been broadcast nationwide.

Miles' interest in creating historical documentaries was nurtured through 25 years of restoring archival films and early feature classics for Killiam Shows, Inc. and the Walter Reade Organization in New York City.

Miles' film archive is held by the Washington University Film & Media Archive. in St. Louis, Missouri. In addition to Miles' films, the collection contains elements that went into the production process such as interviews, stock footage, photographs, research, producer notes, scripts, and Miles' personal papers.

== Filmography ==
Miles' breakthrough film was Men of Bronze, which opened at the New York Film Festival in 1977 and was later broadcast on PBS. This film tells the story of the black American soldiers of the 369th Infantry Regiment, known as the Harlem Hellfighters, who, because of segregation in the U.S. Army, fought under the French flag in World War I. The regiment spent more time in the front-line trenches that any other American unit, fighting alongside French, Moroccan, and Senegalese soldiers.

His best-known work, the four-part series I Remember Harlem (1981), is a comprehensive look at this famous borough's diverse history. Beginning in the 17th century and going up to the early 1980s, the film chronicles the changes in Harlem. The program's episodes include segments on Harlem's early history and settlement, the Harlem Renaissance, the Great Depression in Harlem, the Civil Rights Movement and political activism in the era of Malcolm X, and the problems and redevelopment of the '70s.

The Different Drummer: Blacks in the Military (1983) concentrated on African-American soldiers in recent decades. Miles's three-part program Black Champions (1986) dealt with African-American athletes and their role in the fight against discrimination. Important topics included the impressive performances of various black athletes at the 1936 Berlin Olympics, Jackie Robinson's integration of Major League Baseball, Althea Gibson's achievements in tennis, and the careers of early black football stars.

Miles co-produced the film on literary legend James Baldwin: The Price of a Ticket, which debuted in 1989 as an episode of PBS's American Masters series. Black Stars in Orbit (1990), a documentary about African-Americans in the space program, was followed by Liberators: Fighting on Two Fronts in World War II (1992), which Miles co-produced with Nina Rosenblum. The latter program continued Miles's focus on the experiences of black soldiers and centered on the liberation of Nazi concentration camps. The Black West, an episode of the TBS series, The Untold West, presented the story of African Americans in the U.S. west in the late 19th century.

Mr. Miles has won an Emmy Award, been nominated for an Academy Award, and was inducted into the Black Filmmaker's Hall of Fame. He has also received the Lifetime Achievement Award from the Association of Independent Video and Filmmakers (AIVF) for his outstanding contributions to the history of African Americans in the medium of film.

== Awards ==
- Emmy Awards
- Oscar nomination (1992)
- Lifetime Achievement Award from the Association for independent Video and Filmmaker (AIVF)
- Award of Excellence, Communications Excellence to Black Audiences (CEBA)
- Alfred I. Dupont - Columbia Award (1982)
