= György Bálint =

Hungarian politician (1919–2020)

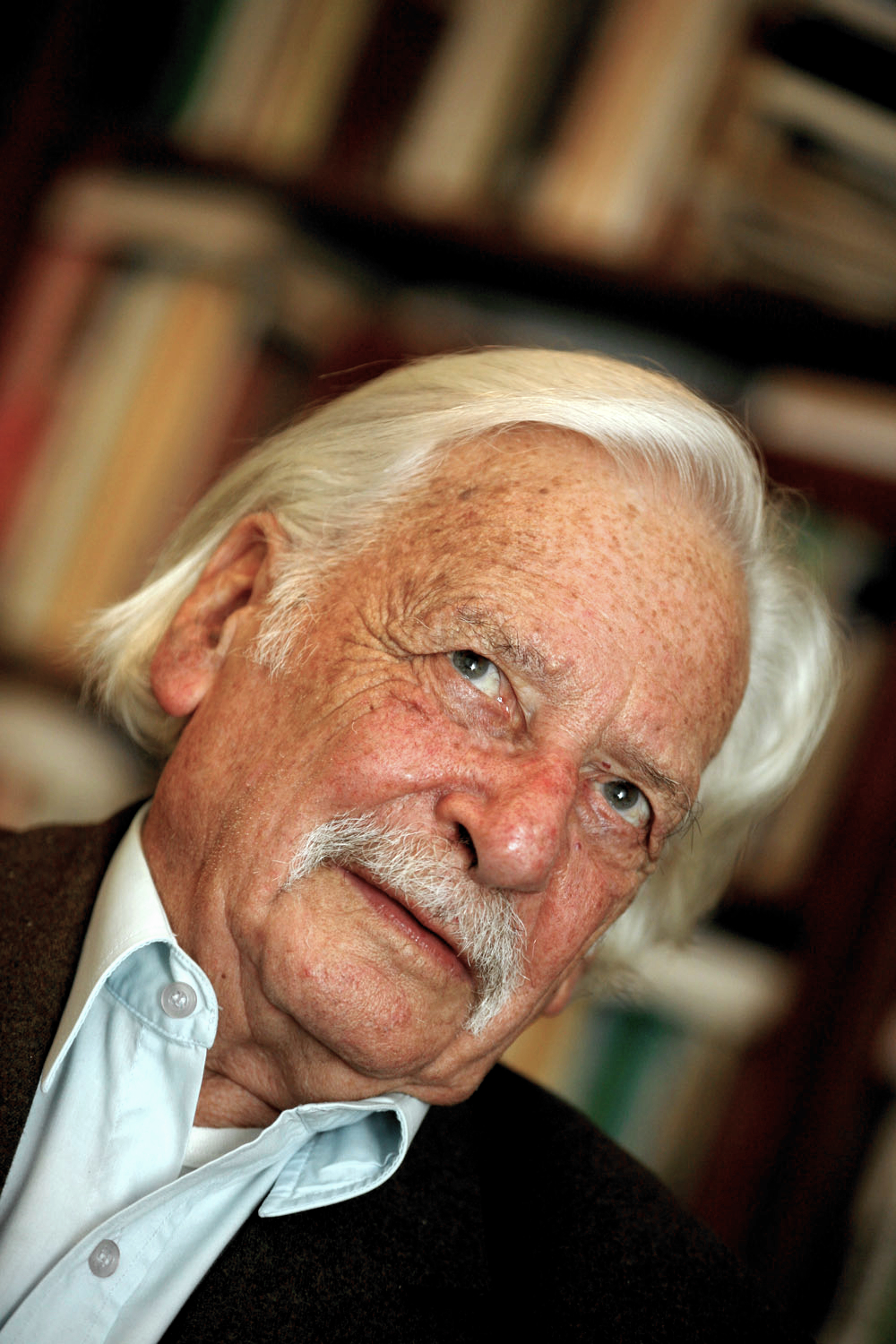
- György Bálint in 2009
- Born: György Braun; 28 July 1919; Gyöngyös, Hungary
- Died: 21 June 2020 (aged 100); Kistarcsa, Hungary
- Occupations: Candidate of Agricultural Sciences, journalist, politician

György Bálint (originally surname Braun; 28 July 1919 – 21 June 2020) was a Hungarian horticulturist, Candidate of Agricultural Sciences, journalist, author, and politician who served as an MP. He was colloquially known as Bálint gazda (lit. "Farmer Bálint"), from his appearances in the TV program Ablak, where he appeared as an amicable, fatherly horticultural expert.

== Biography ==
Bálint's parents Braun Izidor and Koch Rozália were Jewish from a long tradition of farming. He graduated from the Royal Hungarian Institute of Horticulture in 1941. His parents and their children were deported to a concentration camp during the Holocaust; only Bálint and one of his sisters survived. He was taken first to Mauthausen and then to the extermination camp in Gunskirchen. He weighed 42 kilos when he escaped in 1945.

He was a horticulturist, Candidate of Agricultural Sciences, journalist, author, and politician who served as an MP.

He died at 100 years of age in 2020 from COVID-19 during the COVID-19 pandemic in Hungary.
