= Trezzvant Anderson =

American journalist (1906–1963)

Trezzvant William Anderson (November 22, 1906 – March 25, 1963) was an American journalist, publicist, and war correspondent.

== Life and career ==
Anderson was born in Charlotte, North Carolina, and attended the city's Johnson C. Smith College, but left before his graduation. While at college, Anderson served as features editor of the college's newspaper, The University Student.

In the 1930s, Anderson worked as a publicist for the singer Billy Eckstine, who was then at the start of his career.

Anderson wrote the book Come Out Fighting: The Epic Tale of the 761st Tank Battalion, 1942-1945 (1945) about the United States Army's 761st Tank Battalion exploits during World War II. The battalion was made up of primarily African-American soldiers. The battalion received a Presidential Unit Citation and several individuals in the battalion won awards for their heroism.

In 1947, Anderson joined the Pittsburgh Courier, and after initially working in Pittsburgh, became "The Courier Roving Reporter" in 1957, covering the nascent civil rights movement in the Southern states. Anderson died in Macon, Georgia in 1963.
