= The Liberators: Fighting on Two Fronts in World War II =

1992 film

- Directed by: Bill Miles; Nina Rosenblum
- Written by: John Crowley
- Produced by: Bill Miles; Nina Rosenblum
- Narrated by: Denzel Washington
- Edited by: Steven Olswang
- Production company: Miles Educational Film Productions
- Distributed by: Direct Cinema; PBS (television)
- Release date: November 11, 1992
- Running time: 90 minutes
- Country: United States
- Language: English

The Liberators: Fighting on Two Fronts in World War II is a 1992 documentary film co-produced by Bill Miles and Nina Rosenblum and narrated by the actors Louis Gossett Jr. and Denzel Washington. Using interviews, photographs, and diary readings, it tells the story of the primarily black 761st Tank Battalion and 183rd Combat Engineers during World War II, including their experiences of racism in the United States and their involvement in the liberation of Nazi concentration camps. The film was nominated for an Academy Award for Best Documentary Feature.

The documentary was criticized for misidentifying the units and camps involved in the liberation of concentration camps. There was speculation that the film was intended to reduce tensions between the Jewish and African-American communities in the aftermath of the 1991 Crown Heights Riot.

WNET’s investigation into the film found that Paul Parks, identified in The Liberators as serving in the 183rd Combat Engineers Battalion, had actually served in the 365th Engineers, which was close to Le Havre, France on the day of Dachau's liberation. The U.S. Army Center of Military History reported that it had no records “to prove or disprove that there were African American units that participated in the liberation of Dachau.” However, a Holocaust survivor said in an interview with Elliot Perlman that there were black troops present on the day of the liberation of Dachau.

The Liberators was described as "outstanding but ultimately flawed" in a review published in The Journal of American History, because although it gave a "vivid portrayal of discrimination, humiliation, courage, and achievement", it distorted history by strongly implying, using footage interspersed with the interviews, that the 761st Tank Battalion was involved in the liberation of the Buchenwald and Dachau. The 761st liberated the Gunskirchen sub-unit of the Mauthausen concentration camp, but were not near either Buchenwald or Dachau when they were liberated. It was suggested that this false impression was given for dramatic effect because Gunskirchen has less name recognition than the other concentration camps.

Facing History and Ourselves describes the film as "a valuable contribution to the oral history of this period, particularly about segregation in the United States."

A companion book was published based on the film's research.
