= Camp Claiborne =

U.S. Army military camp in Louisiana

Coordinates: 31°04′14″N 92°32′56″W

Camp Claiborne was a U.S. Army military camp in the 1930s continuing through World War II located in Rapides Parish in central Louisiana. The camp was under the jurisdiction of the U.S. Eighth Service Command, and included 23,000 acres (93 km²). The camp was just north of the town of present-day Forest Hill, near the intersection of U.S. Highway 165 and Louisiana Highway 112.

== History ==
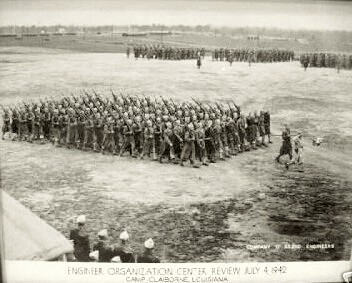
332nd Training at Camp Claiborne, LA

It was established June 10, 1930, as Camp Evangeline, named for the Evangeline District of the Kisatchie National Forest, where it was situated. It was later renamed for the Governor of the Territory of Orleans and first governor of the State of Louisiana, William C.C. Claiborne. In 1939, construction crews were sent to expand the camp, and it was activated in 1940.

From 1939 to 1946, over half a million men went through Camp Claiborne. The camp was mainly used for basic training and artillery practice, which included the nearby Winn District-Kisatchie Precision Bombing Range. It was also home to the Engineering Unit Training Command (EUTC). Special service forces training was also conducted there, including railroad battalion training. The 34th Infantry Division came to Claiborne for its basic training and would be the first American force sent to the European Theater of Operations (ETO).

In 1941, prior to the United States declaring war, the camp was used as part of the Louisiana Maneuvers, a 400,000-man training exercise involving two imaginary countries fighting each other. The two armies faced each other across the Red River, over 3,400 square miles (8,800 km^{2}) of land, part of which was in East Texas. Near the end of the war, German prisoners of war (POW) were held at the camp.

Many of the men, like the ones from the 32nd and 34th Infantry Divisions who were mostly from Iowa, Minnesota, Michigan, North Dakota, South Dakota, and Wisconsin, had never been to the South. Not only did they have to get used to basic training, they had to get used to the hot, humid, low-lying Camp Claiborne as well as nearby Camp Beauregard.

Camp Claiborne was deactivated and dismantled in 1945, and the land returned to Kisatchie National Forest, as part of the National Forest System, administered by the U.S. Forest Service.

== Units serving ==
Many units were created or reactivated at Camp Claiborne to include the 84th Infantry Division, 5th Armored Group, 784th Tank Battalion, 82nd Airborne Division, 407th Brigade Support Battalion, 332nd Engineer General Service Regiment, 333rd Engineer Special Service Regiment, 343rd Engineer General Service Regiment, 344th Engineer General Service Regiment, 372nd Engineer General Service Regiment, 101st Airborne Division, 327th Infantry Regiment, 205th Infantry Brigade (renamed 103rd Reconnaissance Troop), 325th Infantry Regiment, 412th Engineer Command (372nd Engineer General Service Regiment during WWII), 761st Tank Battalion, 497th Transportation Company, 151st Field Artillery First Battalion, 33rd Infantry Regiment, 18th Engineer Brigade, 1195th Engineer Base Depot Group Redesignated 1195th Engineer Combat Group HHC, 361st Special Services Engineers Regiment, 393rd Special Services Engineers Regiment. The 103rd Infantry Division was ordered into active military service on 15 November 1942 at Camp Claiborne, Louisiana. The 761st Tank Battalion was formed and trained here. Also known as the Black Panthers, they were the first all black tank battalion formed in US Army history. The 711th Railroad Operating Battalion (August 1941), 174th Railroad Operating Battalion (October 1942), 725th Railroad Operating Battalion (February 1943), 712th Railroad Operating Battalion (December 1943), 718th Railroad Operating Battalion (March 1944).

== Railroad ==
A film from Camp Claiborne from March 8, 9 and 10 1944 of derailment tests done on the Claiborne-Polk Military Railroad. The tests were done to better train allied personnel in acts of rail sabotage during World War 2.

To simulate wartime repairs of railroads, the Claiborne-Polk Military Railroad was built. The railroad was about 50 miles long and had 25 bridges. It crossed the Calcasieu River. This was also used to experiment with derailing of trains.

It ran from Camp Claiborne—on the Missouri Pacific south of Alexandria—westward 48 miles to Camp Polk—on the Kansas City Southern south of Leesville. Construction began on 4 September 1941, and the Golden Spike ceremony was held on 11 July 1942. In October 1942, the soldiers who had built the Claiborne-Polk Military Railroad shipped out to Iran, where they helped operate the Trans-Iranian Railroad. The foundation of the locomotive shop and other remnants can still be seen.

The 725th and other ROBs referred to it as the "Crime and Punishment" railroad, and was built by the 711th ROB and Army engineers. The engines used were 40 years old, and the freight cars, some not U.S. made, were two generations old. Some European cars had only 4 wheels, and did not do well on curves. Derailments occurred so often that they pulled a crane to pick up derailed cars and repair the roadbed. Often, even the crane derailed. Sometimes the rails sunk under the swamp, and cars were lost in the quicksand. More than one engineer reported seeing the rails swaying and vibrating for some time after the train had passed. It was reported that one engine was lost in the quicksand and is still there. In other cases, buildings were erected on top of the lost equipment, using it as a foundation.

== Old buildings ==
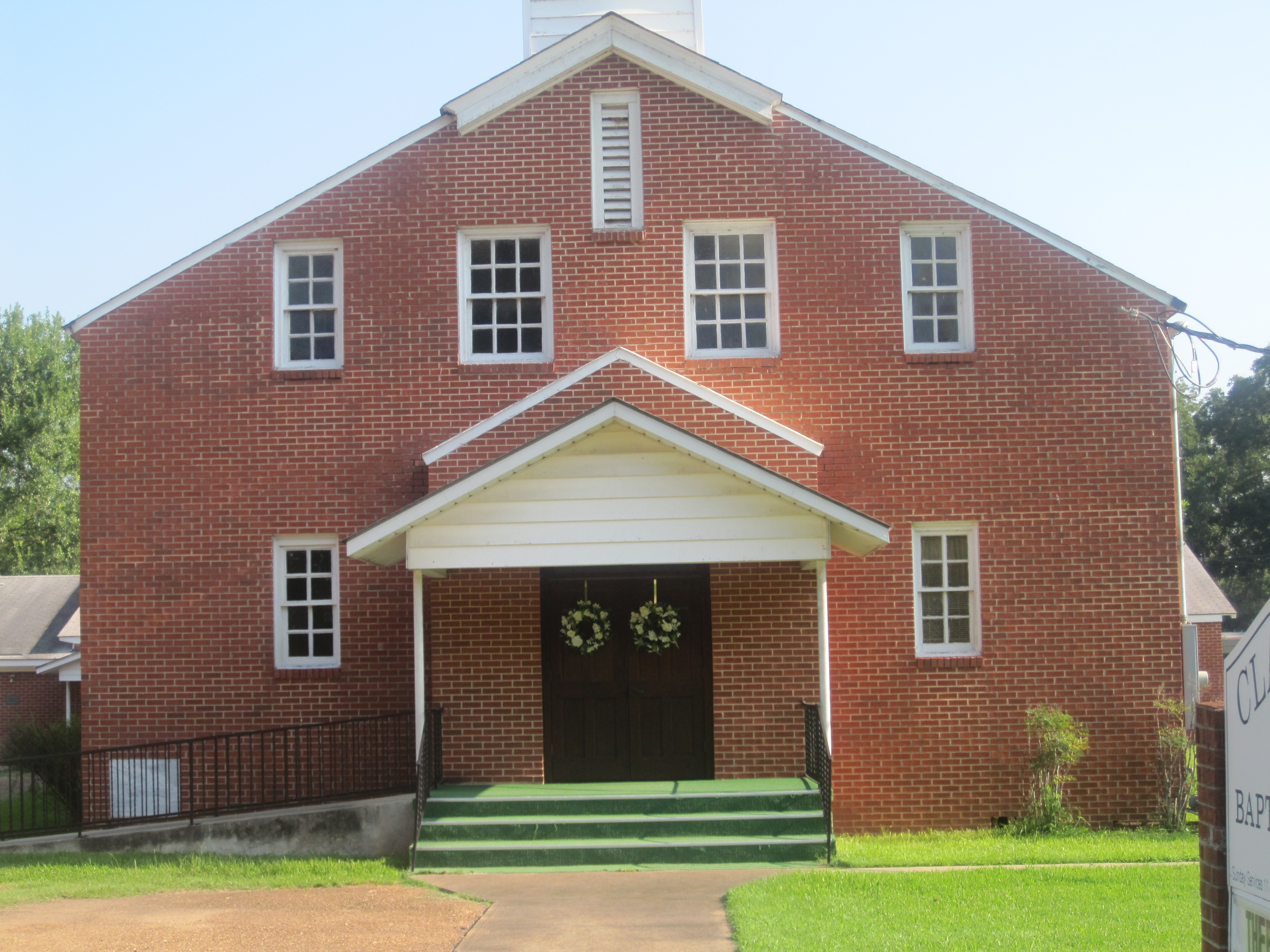
Camp Claiborne chapel relocated to become Clarence Baptist Church in 1948.

When the camp was closed in 1948, many buildings were donated or sold in the area and were moved. Some can be found in Forest Hill.

The St. Catherine Church, at the junction of U.S. 165 with Robinson Bridge Road, uses one of the military buildings.

The Camp Claiborne chapel was relocated to Clarence in Natchitoches Parish, where it is still used for worship services by the Clarence Baptist Church. The balcony, now a storage area, was used by African American troops who were segregated in worship from white soldiers who used the pews of the lower tier.

Our Lady of Lourdes Catholic Church in Marksville Avoyelles Parish purchased an old building from Camp Claiborne after World War II for conversion as a rectory.

Some buildings were purchased by Southeastern Louisiana University.

== Today ==
The U.S. Forest Service (USFS) manages the property where the camp once was. Not much is left: part of a gate and a handful of scattered shells of buildings, some of which have been fenced off and sealed with sheets of metal. Many streets still exist, as well as parking lots and footings of the original buildings. The USFS also maintains Claiborne Trail, a 26-mile (42 km) trail system for hiking, walking and biking through the area.

Today the U.S. Army Corps of Engineers (USACE) is in the process of evaluating the grounds of the former camp to see how feasible it would be to remove possible unexploded ordnance.
