= 761st Tank Battalion (United States) =

Military unit

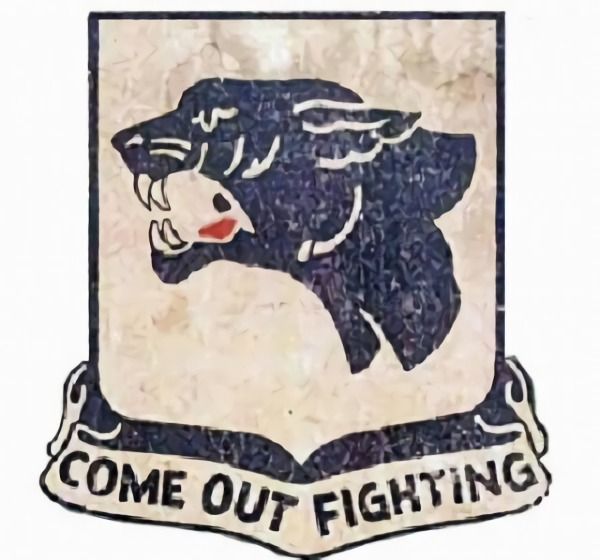
- Active: 1942–1946 (segregated unit); 1947–1955 (integrated unit)
- Allegiance: United States
- Branch: U.S. Army
- Type: Separate tank battalion
- Role: Armored warfare
- Size: Battalion
- Nickname: Black Panthers
- Motto: Come Out Fighting
- Colors: Blue, red, yellow
- Mascot: Black panther
- Engagements: World War II; Guebling; Moyenvic; Vic-sur-Seille; Morville; Battle of the Bulge; Central Europe
- Decorations: Presidential Unit Citation

Commanders
- Notable commanders: Lt. Col. Paul L. Bates

The 761st Tank Battalion was an independent tank battalion of the United States Army during World War II. Its ranks primarily consisted of African American soldiers, who by War Department policy were not permitted to serve in the same units as white troops; the United States Armed Forces did not officially desegregate until after World War II. The 761st were known as the Black Panthers after their distinctive unit insignia, which featured a black panther's head, and the unit's motto was "Come out fighting". Decades after the war, the unit received a Presidential Unit Citation for its actions. In addition, a large number of individual members also received medals, including one Medal of Honor, eleven Silver Stars and approximately 300 Purple Hearts.

== Prior to combat ==
Immediately before and during World War II, U.S. military leaders had reservations about using African American soldiers in combat. General Lesley J. McNair, the commander of Army Ground Forces, successfully argued that "colored" units should be employed in combat. At McNair's suggestion, the U.S. Army began to experiment with segregated combat units in 1941; the program was supported by, and given national exposure in, Life magazine. The 761st was constituted on 15 March 1942, and activated 1 April 1942, at Camp Claiborne, Louisiana. The battalion began training in M5 Stuart light tanks. They learned how to maneuver, mount, dismount, and maintain the vehicle's 37 mm main gun and .30 caliber machine guns. Final training was at Fort Hood, Texas, where they were upgraded to the M4 Sherman medium tank, which had a 75 mm main gun, two .30 caliber machine guns, a .50 caliber machine gun, and a two-inch smoke mortar.

Most of the black tankers had to train in installations located in Southern states such as Kentucky, Louisiana, and Texas. In the days before the civil rights advances made in the 1960s, black people were still treated harshly in the South and often considered inferior by white residents. The men of the 761st trained for almost two years, conscious of the fact that White units were being sent overseas after much less training.

=== Racial tension ===
Black soldiers of that time and place were subject to many racist crimes perpetrated by White soldiers, including a bloody riot between members of a neighboring segregated tank battalion and White military policemen in Alexandria, Louisiana on 10 January 1942. Several members of the 761st vowed to retaliate. They commandeered six tanks and a half-track but were persuaded to stand down by their commander Lieutenant Colonel Paul Bates who promised to straighten the situation out.

=== Jackie Robinson and segregation ===
The most famous member of the 761st was First Lieutenant Jack Roosevelt "Jackie" Robinson. During the 761st's training, a White bus driver told Robinson to move to the back of the bus. Robinson refused and was arrested. Battalion commander Lieutenant Colonel Paul L. Bates refused to consider the court-martial charges put forward by the arresting military policemen. The post commander transferred Robinson to the 758th Tank Battalion, whose commander was willing to sign the insubordination court-martial order. Robinson was acquitted of all charges, but was kept stateside and placed on inactive duty in October 1944. After the war, he was instrumental in desegregating professional baseball.

== Deployment ==
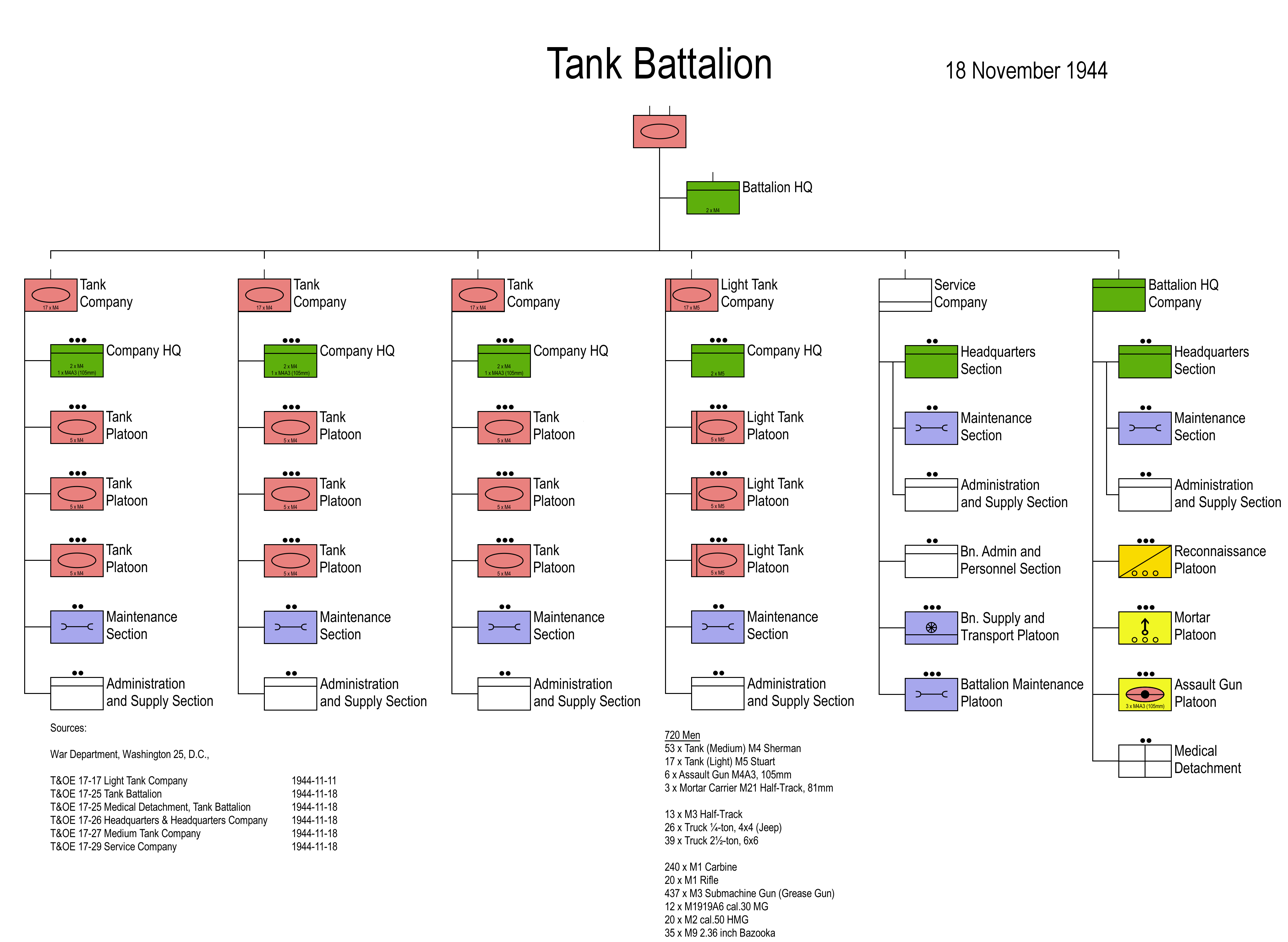
US tank battalion structure, November 1944.

General Ben Lear, commander of the U.S. Second Army, rated the unit "superior" after a special review and deemed the unit "combat ready." After the two-year training session in Texas, 761st Tank Battalion received the order on 9 June 1944 for overseas movement three days after the D-Day landings in Normandy. The battalion left aboard the British troop carrier Esperance Bay from New York and arrived in Britain on 8 September 1944 and was initially assigned to the Ninth Army. After a brief deployment to England, the 761st landed in France via Omaha Beach on 10 October 1944. The unit arrived (with six White officers, thirty black officers, and 676 black enlisted men) and was assigned to General George Patton's US Third Army at his request, attached to the 26th Infantry Division.

The unit saw action in Northern France from October 1944, it fought in the Battle of the Bulge, later proceeding to the Rhineland, and spent the final months of the war on German soil.

=== George S. Patton ===
As the 761st was about to enter combat, General George S. Patton reviewed the battalion and made a speech to the men which offered a guarded vote of confidence in their abilities:

Men, you're the first Negro tankers to ever fight in the American Army. I would never have asked for you if you weren't good. I have nothing but the best in my Army. I don't care what color you are as long as you go up there and kill those Kraut sonsofbitches. Everyone has their eyes on you and is expecting great things from you. Most of all your race is looking forward to your success. Don't let them down and damn you, don't let me down! They say it is patriotic to die for your country. Well, let’s see how many patriots we can make out of those German sonsofbitches.

However, like most American military officers of the era, Patton expressed his doubts about using black men in combat. On returning to headquarters following the review, he remarked, "They gave a good first impression, but I have no faith in the inherent fighting ability of the race." He only put this sentiment aside and accepted the 761st when he desperately needed all the ground power he could get. Even after the war, Patton was not inclined to reform his perception of black soldiers. In War As I Knew It, he relates the interaction described above, and comments, "Individually they were good soldiers, but I expressed my belief at the time, and have never found the necessity of changing it, that a colored soldier cannot think fast enough to fight in armor."

Patton's biographer Carlo D'Este explained that "on the one hand he could and did admire the toughness and courage" of some black soldiers, but his writings can also be frequently read as "disdaining them and their officers because they were not part of his social order." Historian Hugh Cole pointed out that Patton was also the first American military leader to integrate rifle companies "when manpower got tight." Retired NBA Hall-of-Famer Kareem Abdul-Jabbar, co-author of Brothers in Arms: The Epic Story of the 761st Tank Battalion, WWII's Forgotten Heroes, agreed that although Patton was a bigot the fact remains that he did lend his name to the advancement of blacks in the military at the time, unlike most other military officers (Patton did prevent a black soldier from being lynched while serving as commander of a fort in El Paso before the war). Most of the veterans of the 761st that Abdul-Jabbar interviewed stated they were proud to have served under Patton.

During the Battle of the Bulge, German soldiers who had raided American warehouses were reported to have disguised themselves as Americans guarding checkpoints in order to ambush American soldiers. Patton solved this problem by ordering black soldiers, including the 761st, to guard the checkpoints, and gave the order to shoot any White soldiers at the checkpoints who acted suspiciously.

=== Combat record ===
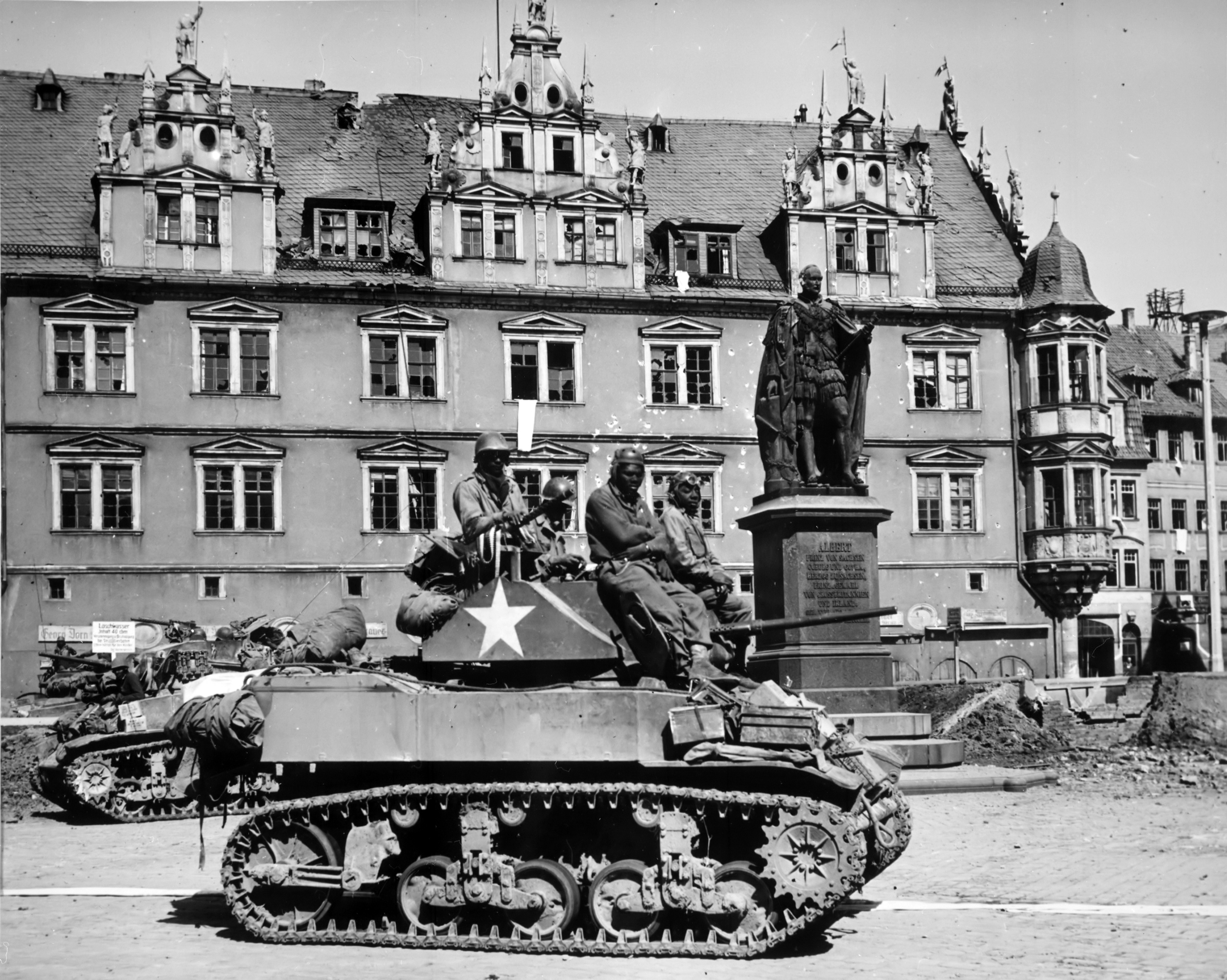
Tankers from Company D awaiting the next mission in Coburg, Germany, April 1945

The battalion first saw combat on 7 November 1944, fighting through towns such as Moyenvic, Vic-sur-Seille, often at the leading edge of the advance. The fighting that 761st engaged in at Morville-lès-Vic was particularly brutal. The unit endured 183 days of continuous operational employment.

The 761st Tank Battalion suffered 156 casualties in November 1944; 24 men killed, 81 wounded, and 44 non-battle losses. The unit also lost 14 tanks evacuated and another 20 damaged in combat. In December, the battalion was rushed to the aid of the 101st Airborne Division at Bastogne. As part of the effort to drive the Germans from the vicinity of Bastogne, the battalion fought to capture the municipality of Tillet, less than 15 km west of the town, in early January 1945. Supporting the elements of the 87th Infantry Division with just eleven tanks, the battalion took control of the city from the 113th Panzer Brigade through two days of combat, losing nine tanks in the process.

After the Battle of the Bulge, the unit opened the way for the U.S. 4th Armored Division into Germany during an action that breached the Siegfried Line. The 761st smashed through dozens of German cities and towns in their rapid advance through the Reich. In the final days of the war in Europe, the 761st was one of the first American units to reach Steyr, Austria, at the Enns River, where they met with the 1st Ukrainian Front of the Soviet Red Army. On 4 May 1945, the 761st, along with the 71st Infantry Division, liberated the Gunskirchen concentration camp; the German guards had fled not long before.

=== Ruben Rivers' Medal of Honor ===
For unusual heroism in serving with Company A of the 761st, the Medal of Honor was awarded posthumously to Staff Sergeant Ruben Rivers in 1997.

=== Presidential Unit Citation ===
After decades of racial tensions in the United States began to ease, the battalion was belatedly awarded the Presidential Unit Citation by President Jimmy Carter on 24 January 1978, for their World War II service. The 761st Tank Battalion's award became official on 10 April 1978 by the Department of the Army under General Orders Number 5.

== After World War II ==
On 24 November 1947, the 761st was reactivated (as an integrated unit) at Fort Knox, Kentucky, and assigned to the Regular Army, where it served until again inactivated on 15 March 1955.

== Permanent monument ==
A monument dedicated to the 761st Tank Battalion was unveiled at Fort Cavazos, Texas, during a ceremony attended by surviving veterans on 10 November 2005, as a permanent tribute to soldiers who had served and continued to serve throughout the world for liberty, honor, and democracy. The monument features four black granite tablets surrounding a life-size marble sculpture of a 761st Tank Battalion fighter kneeling atop a black granite pedestal engraved with a tank on the front and a panther on the back.

The monument is located on 761st Tank Battalion Drive.

== Awards ==
- CAMPAIGN STREAMERS: Northern France, Rhineland, Ardennes-Alsace, Central Europe.
- Presidential Unit Citation
- Medal of Honor: 1
- Purple Hearts: 296 (8 with clusters)
- Silver Stars: 11
- Bronze Stars: 69

Countries: France, Belgium, the Netherlands, Luxembourg, Germany, and Austria.

== Attachments ==
- Third Army:
  - 4th Armored Division (United States)
  - 1st, 26th, 71st and 87th Infantry Divisions
  - 17th Airborne Division (United States)
  - 17th Armored Group
- Seventh Army:
  - 1st and 103rd Infantry Divisions
- Ninth Army:
  - 79th and 95th Infantry Divisions
  - XVI Corps

Commanding Officers
(1 April 1942 – 1 June 1946)
Lt Col Edward E. Cruise	1 April 1942 – 21 November 1942
Maj John R. Wright Jr.	22 November 1942 – 3 July 1943
Lt Col Paul L. Bates	4 July 1943 – 8 November 1944
Lt Col Hollis E. Hunt	9 November 1944 – 23 February 1945
Lt Col Paul L. Bates	24 February 1945 – 1 June 1946

== Dramatizations and portrayals ==
Trezzvant Anderson's book, Come Out Fighting: The Epic Tale of the 761st Tank Battalion, 1942–1945, was published in 1945.

In 1992, a documentary titled The Liberators: Fighting on Two Fronts in World War II was produced. The documentary depicted the battalion's liberation of concentration camps during 1945 but was criticized for misidentifying the units and camps involved.

In 2007, executive producer Steven A. White released an independent, feature length, high-definition documentary on the 761st Tank Battalion. The film, entitled 761st was written, produced, and directed by Pete Chatmon and produced by 761st Tank Battalion unit historian, Wayne Robinson. It features interviews with eleven combat veterans of the 761st and is narrated by Andre Braugher.

Several of the later episodes of The History Channel series Patton 360 featured 761st veteran William McBurney who related his experiences with the battalion in the Lorraine Campaign, the Battle of the Bulge, and in the ultimate conquest of the German homeland.

A 1993 episode of Law & Order titled "Profile" featured a 72-year-old assault victim played by Joe Seneca who credited his experiences with the 761st for saving his life.

In an episode of The Cosby Show, Cliff Huxtable and some male friends are discussing their military experiences and one of them describes in detail his World War II exploits as a member of the 761st Tank Battalion.

Actor Morgan Freeman and Kareem Abdul-Jabbar are co-producing a new movie about the 761st, based on Jabbar's and co-writer Anthony Walton's 2004 book, Brothers in Arms. On 15 December 2006, Freeman discussed the film and working with Will Smith, and possibly Denzel Washington, on it in the near future.

The 1991 novel Seven Six One by "G.F. Borden" was based on the experiences of the 761st Tank Battalion in Europe.

In the 2004 video game Call of Duty: Finest Hour, a sergeant from the 761st is a playable character. The game depicts the battalion's fight in the Belgian town of Tillet.

In the science fiction novel, The Light of Men (2008) by Andrew Salmon, the 761st liberate the fictional concentration camp of Gutundbose in which the story is set.

In the 1981 police mystery Chiefs, written by Stuart Woods, and the CBS mini-series of the same name, the 761st is mentioned as the unit of the ill-fated black mechanic Marshall Parker, killed after being arrested on false pretenses by Sonny Butts and Charley Ward, beaten and shot. Later, it is revealed as having been the unit of the new black police chief of Delano, Georgia, Tucker Watts, who was once, much earlier, known as Willie Cole, whose father had murdered Delano's first chief of police, Will Henry Lee.

The character of Ronsel Jackson in the 2017 film Mudbound is a veteran of the 761st Tank Battalion.

Author Brenda Woods' 2019 novel, The Unsung Hero of Birdsong, USA, is about a White boy named Gabriel Haberlin who befriends a black man named Meriwether Hunter who was a member of the 761st Tank Battalion.

In the third episode of the eighth season of the series Archer, The titular character is discussing his WWII experience with the members of a jazz quartet, one of whom states he was a member of the 761st Tank Battalion.

Black Panthers of WWII is a 2025 film with negative reviews about its acting, CGI, and historical accuracy.

== See also ==
- 784th Tank Battalion
