= 758th Tank Battalion (United States) =

- Active: 1941–49
- Allegiance: United States of America
- Branch: United States Army
- Type: Armored warfare
- Role: Reconnaissance
- Nickname: "Tuskers"
- Motto: We Pierce
- Mascot: African Elephant
- Engagements: World War II

The 758th Tank Battalion was a tank battalion of the United States Army that served during World War II, later becoming the 1st Battalion, 64th Armor Regiment.

The 758th, the first armored unit whose members were African American soldiers, was formed in 1941 and served in Italy.

== History ==
On 13 January 1941, the U.S. Army established the 78th Tank Battalion, the first black armored unit. In March 1941 the tankers reported to Fort Knox, Kentucky, to begin armored warfare training. On 8 May 1941 at Fort Knox, Kentucky the 78th Tank Battalion was re-designated as the 758th Tank Battalion (Light). It was the first of three units that would form the all-black 5th Tank Group. The 758th trained in mechanized warfare using the M5 light tank. One of the battalion's more notable members was future baseball star Jackie Robinson.

Robinson was transferred to the unit from the 761st Tank Battalion after an incident in which he refused to move to the back of a bus (contracted by the military, and not requiring segregation. The incident escalated to a court martial and wrongful allegations against Robinson). The 758th was permanently attached to the 92nd Infantry Division until the unit was deactivated, on 22 September 1945.

The unit's insignia is the head of a black African elephant with large white tusks accompanied by the motto, "We Pierce".

== Legacy ==
The 758th was re-designated as the 64th Heavy Tank Battalion from 1949 to 1957. It later became the 1st Battalion, 64th Armor Regiment, assigned to the 1st Armored Brigade Combat Team of the 3rd Infantry Division. The 1–64th has served with distinction in several armed conflicts including Operation Desert Shield, Operation Desert Fox, Operation Iraqi Freedom, and Operation Enduring Freedom. The unit operates from Fort Stewart, Georgia.

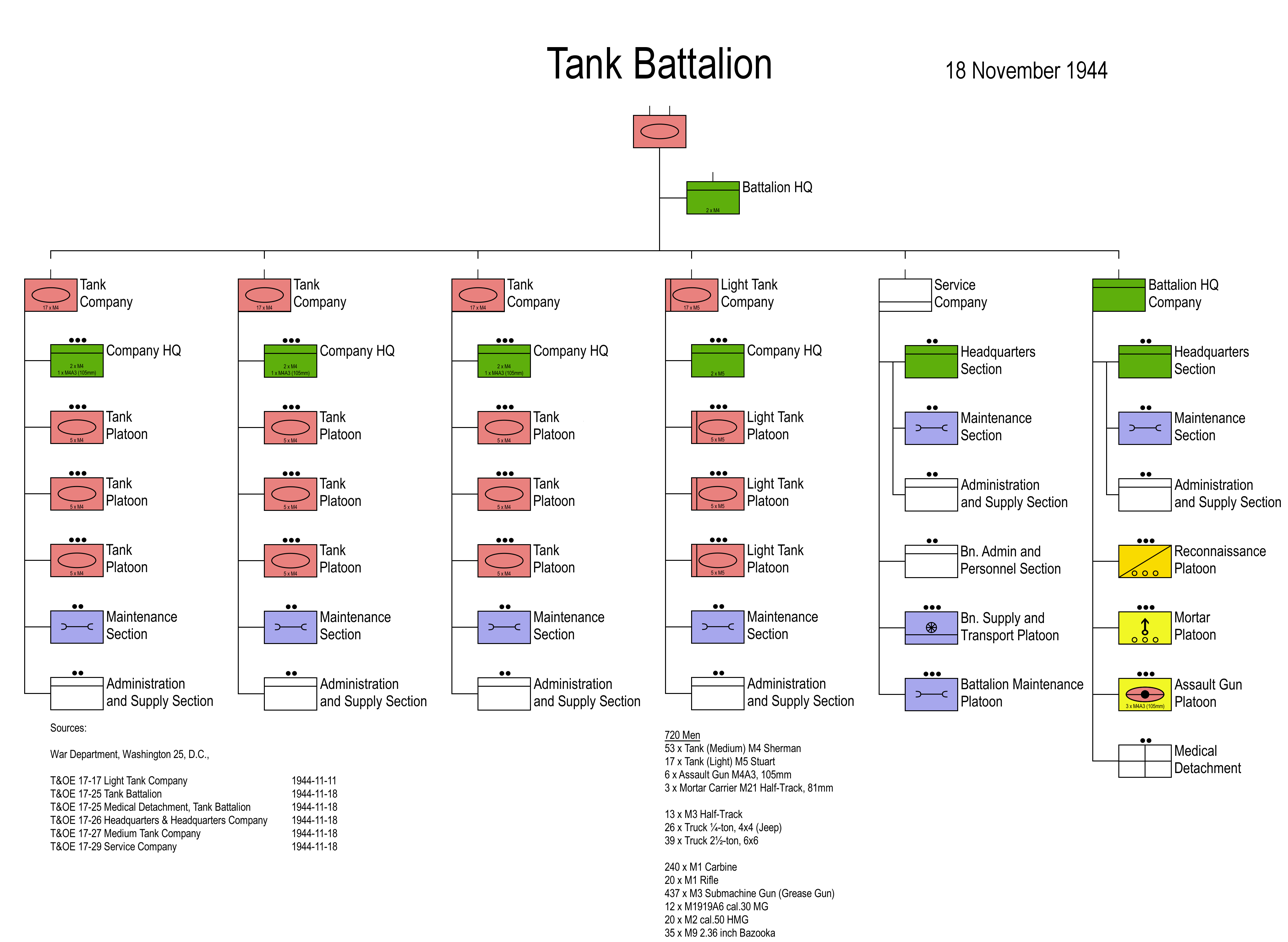
World War II Tank Battalion Structure – November 1944.

The African elephant remains the insignia of the unit and has led to their nickname "The Tusker Regiment". Today they are known as the "Desert Rogues."

== See also ==
- 761st Tank Battalion
- 784th Tank Battalion
