= 784th Tank Battalion (United States) =

- Active: 1942–46 (segregated unit)
- Country: United States of America
- Branch: Army of the United States
- Type: Separate battalion
- Engagements: World War II; *Battle of the Bulge

The 784th Tank Battalion, was a United States Army segregated combat independent tank battalion during World War II.

It was originally attached to the 5th US Tank Group that was based in Camp Claiborne, Louisiana during World War II. The 5th Tank Group also included the 758th Tank Battalion, which saw action in Italy under the 92nd Division, and the most famous, the 761st Tank Battalion, which saw action in Northern Europe and saw extensive action during the Battle of the Bulge. These three units were composed of African American personnel with African American junior officers and white senior officers.

The 784th went into action late December 1944. Landing in France on Christmas Day 1944, the battalion consisted of six companies: A (Able), B (Baker), C (Charlie), D (Dog), Headquarters and Service Company. A, B and C Companies had M4 and M4A3 Medium Tanks while D company had M5A1 Stuart Light Tanks. Headquarters Company had a 105 mm assault platoon, a reconnaissance platoon and 81 mm mortar platoon.

On 31 December 1944, the 784th began official combat operations with the 104th Infantry Division. They participated in actions along the Roer River. On 3 February 1945, the 784th was released from duty with the 104th Division to the 35th Infantry Division. On 8 February 1945, the 784th joined the 35th Division in a major offensive. On 26 February 1945, Able Company of the 784th assisted elements of the 134th Infantry Regiment from the 35th Infantry Division in capturing the town of Hilfarth across the Roer River. The next day they captured the town of Wassenberg. Baker Company along with the 137th Regiment (35th Div) took Golkrath, a village at Erkelenz.

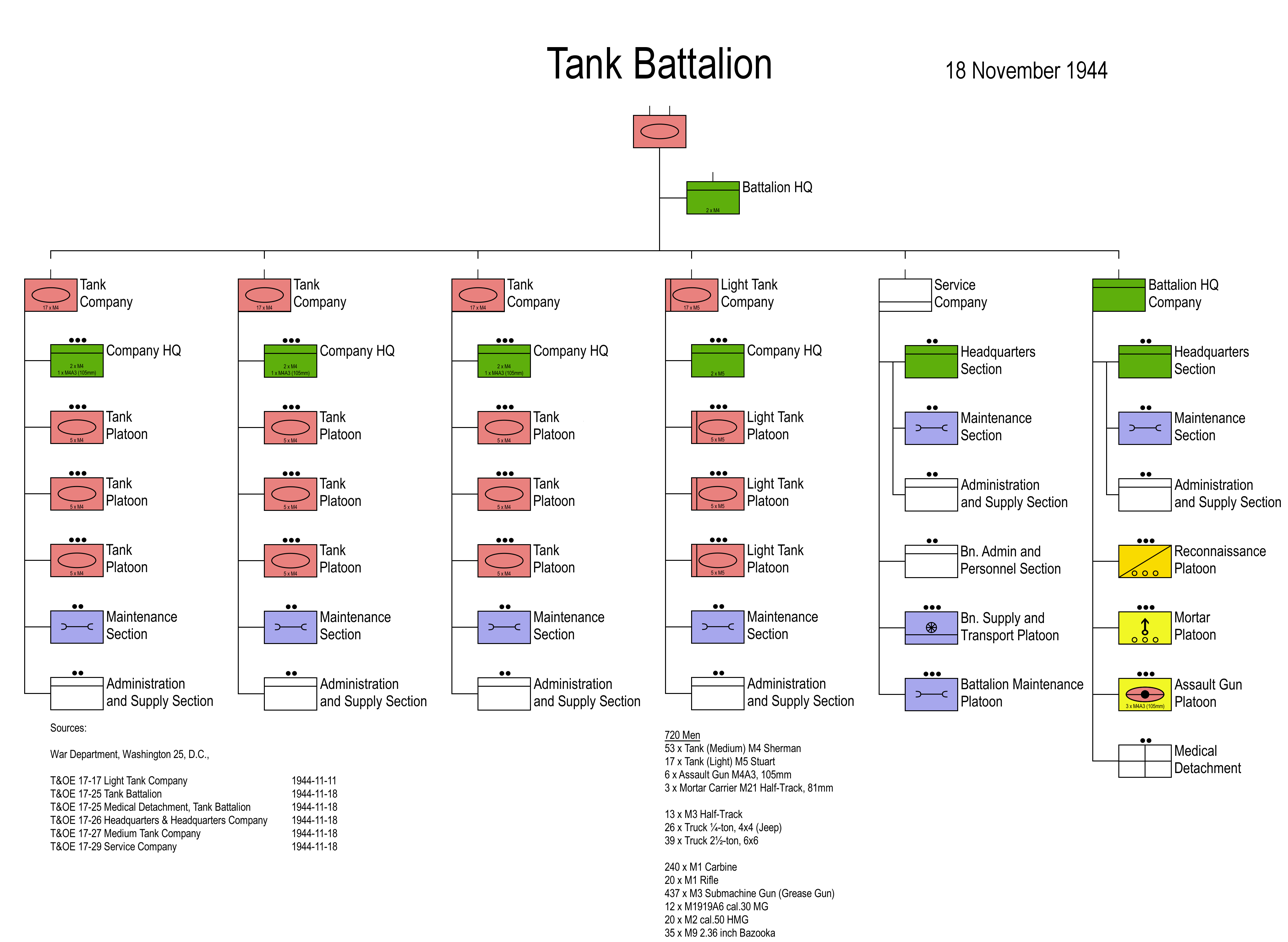
World War II Tank Battalion Structure - November 1944.
