= Guébling =

- Commune
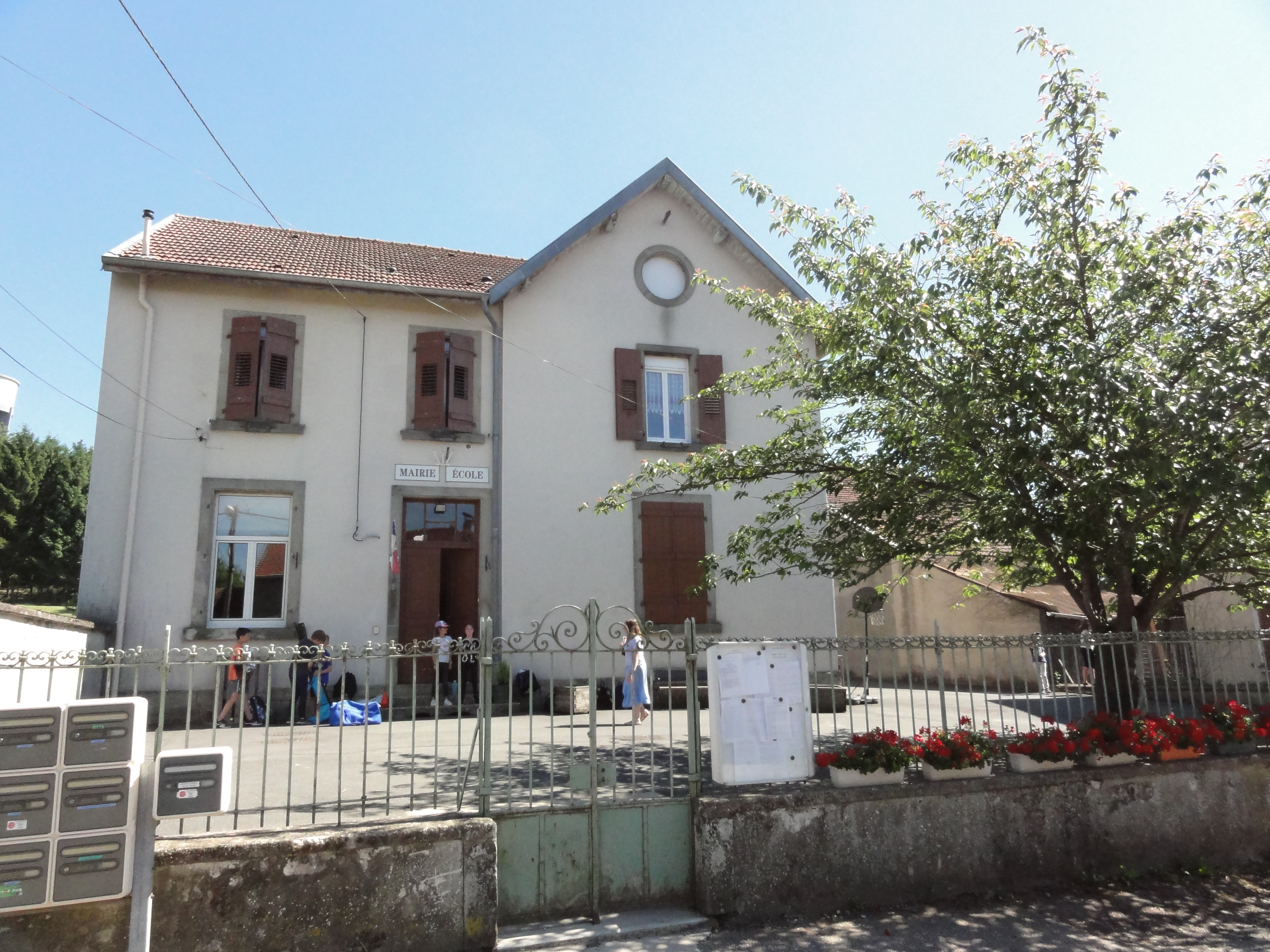
- The town hall and school in Guébling

- Coat of arms
- Location of Guébling
- Location within France Location within Grand Est
- Coordinates: 48°51′50″N 6°44′45″E
- Country: France
- Region: Grand Est
- Department: Moselle
- Arrondissement: Sarrebourg-Château-Salins
- Canton: Le Saulnois
- Intercommunality: CC du Saulnois

Government
  - Mayor (2020–2026): Joseph Remillon
- Area^{1}: 6.86 km^{2} (2.65 sq mi)
- Elevation: 220 m (720 ft)
- Highest elevation: 333 m (1,093 ft)
- Lowest elevation: 216 m (709 ft)
- Population (2023): 125
  - Density: 18.2/km^{2} (47.2/sq mi)
- Time zone: UTC+01:00 (CET)
  - Summer (DST): UTC+02:00 (CEST)
- INSEE/Postal code: 57268 /57260
- ^{1} French Land Register data, which excludes lakes, ponds, glaciers > 1 km^{2} (0.386 sq mi or 247 acres) and river estuaries.

Guébling (French pronunciation: [ɡeblɛ̃]; German: Geblingen) is a commune in the Moselle department in Grand Est in north-eastern France.

== See also ==
- Communes of the Moselle department
