= Gunskirchen =

- Municipality
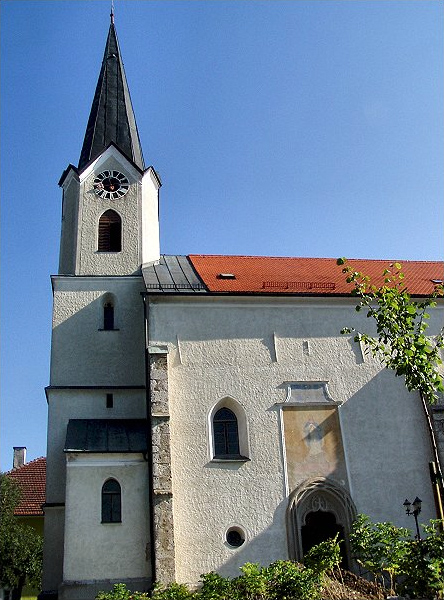

- Coat of arms

- Location within Austria
- Coordinates: 48°08′04″N 13°56′35″E
- Country: Austria
- State: Upper Austria
- District: Wels-Land

Government
  - Mayor: Christian Schöffmann (ÖVP)

Area
  - Total: 36.22 km^{2} (13.98 sq mi)
- Elevation: 352 m (1,155 ft)

Population (2018-01-01)
  - Total: 6,037
  - Density: 166.7/km^{2} (431.7/sq mi)
- Time zone: UTC+1 (CET)
  - Summer (DST): UTC+2 (CEST)
- Postal code: 4623
- Area code: 07246
- Vehicle registration: WL
- Website: www.gunskirchen.com

Gunskirchen is a town in the Austrian state of Upper Austria.

== Geography ==
Gunskirchen lies in the Hausruckviertel. About 11 percent of the municipality is forest, and 78 percent is farmland. Internal combustion engine maker Rotax has been headquartered at Gunskirchen since 1947.

== History ==
=== World War II ===
During World War II one of the sub-camps of the Mauthausen-Gusen concentration camp was located in the village. The camp was rather short-lived. In December 1944, construction for the Gunskirchen camp began. It was planned to house several hundred slave labourers. When the camp was opened in April 1945, however, thousands of prisoners evacuated on death marches from Mauthausen started to flood Gunskirchen. Dr. Edith Eger was among them. In these overcrowded conditions, diseases such as typhus and dysentery spread rapidly through the starving and weakened camp population. The prisoners were—with the exception of 400 political prisoners—Jews from Hungary whom the Germans had forced to march on foot from their homeland to Austria, where they were to be used for forced labour. Some 17,000 Hungarian Jews reportedly passed through the Gunskirchen camp.

On May 4, 1945, troops of 71st Infantry Division and segregated 761st Tank Battalion liberated Gunskirchen. When troops entered the camp, they learned that the SS guards had fled the corpse-littered camp days before. Some 15,000 prisoners were still in the camp. In the months following the liberation, some 1,500 former prisoners died as a consequence of their mistreatment by the Nazis. They were buried in the cemetery in nearby Wels.

One member of the 71st Infantry recounted his first impressions of Gunskirchen:

As we entered the camp, the living skeletons still able to walk crowded around us and, though we wanted to drive farther into the place, the milling, pressing crowd wouldn't let us. It is not an exaggeration to say that almost every inmate was insane with hunger. Just the sight of an American brought cheers, groans and shrieks. People crowded around to touch an American, to touch the jeep, to kiss our arms—perhaps just to make sure that it was true. The people who couldn't walk crawled out toward our jeep. Those who couldn't even crawl propped themselves up on an elbow, and somehow, through all their pain and suffering, revealed through their eyes the gratitude, the joy they felt at the arrival of Americans.--Capt. J. D. Pletcher

The American soldiers immediately began requisitioning supplies and transportation from the local town to provide the prisoners with food and water.

The 71st Infantry Division was recognized as a liberating unit by the United States Army Center of Military History and the United States Holocaust Memorial Museum in 1988.

== See also ==
- The Holocaust
- György Bálint (originally surname Braun; 1919–2020), Hungarian horticulturist, Candidate of Agricultural Sciences, journalist, author, and politician who served as an MP.
