= Forest Hills Co-op Houses =

Co-op development in Queens, New York

Forest Hills Co-operative Houses
- NYCHA property
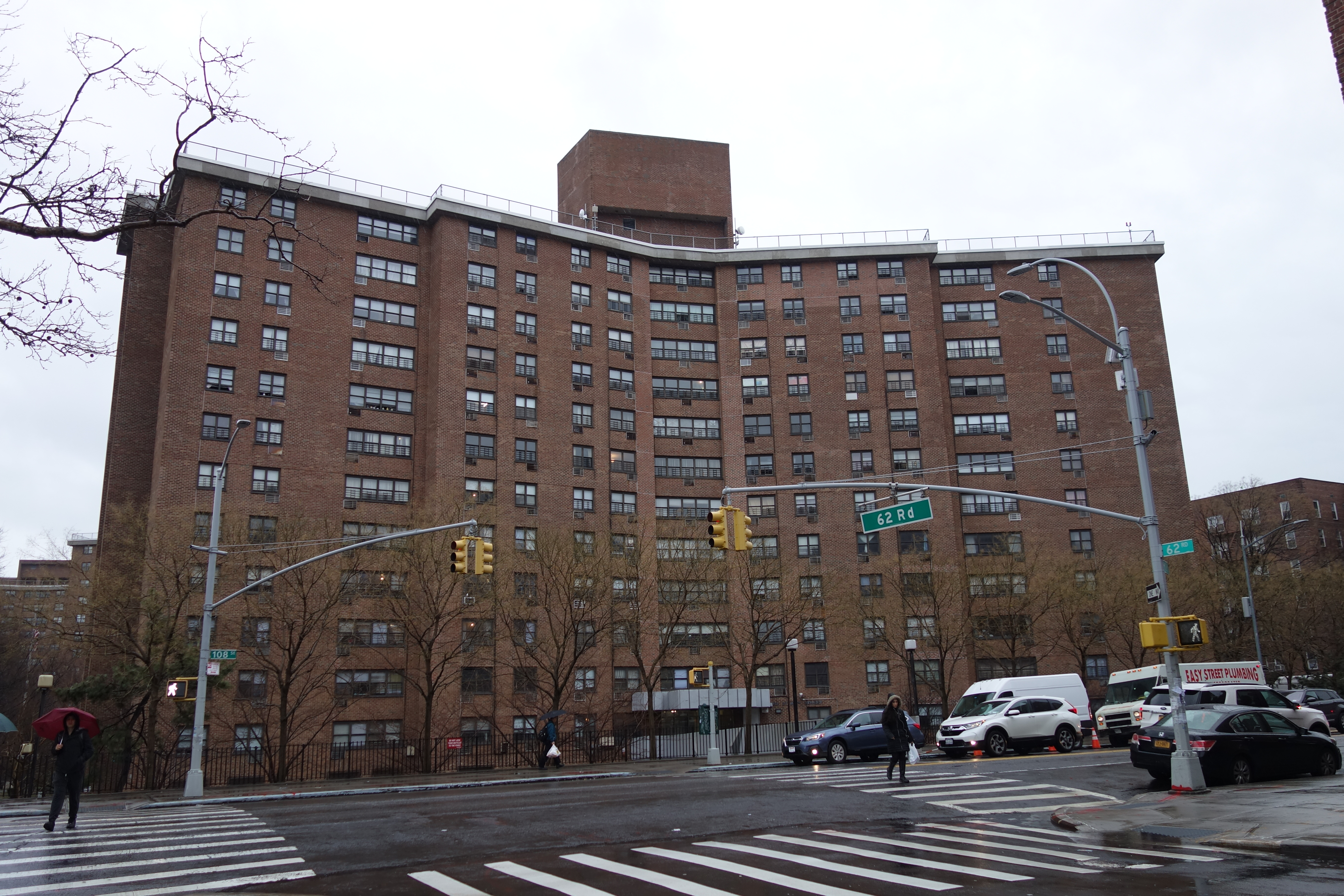
- Interactive map of Forest Hills Co-operative Houses
- Coordinates: 40.7362°N 73.8508°W
- Country: United States
- State: New York
- City: New York City
- Borough: Queens
- ZIP codes: 11375
- Area codes: 718, 347, 929, and 917

The Forest Hills Co-operative Houses are located on an 8.5-acre (34,000 m^{2}) site at 108-03 62nd Drive on the border of the Queens neighborhoods of Forest Hills and Corona in New York City, United States.

== History ==
Unlike the rest of the surrounding neighborhood, the block on which the Houses stand was among the last to be developed because of its soil quality. Initially it was a wetland through which Horse Brook passed on its way from Elmhurst to Flushing Meadows. Near the corner of Colonial Avenue and the future Long Island Expressway, a mill was built in 1652 damming the creek. The block was largely occupied by a reservoir. By the 1930s, surrounding development had dried up the creek and in 1938, the mill was demolished to make way for the Long Island Expressway. Nevertheless, because of the high water table, construction never took place on the block. In the postwar years, the block was used as a golf driving range.

In 1966, Mayor John V. Lindsay announced plans to build three 24-story low-income housing projects on the empty block as part of his scatter-site plan, where low-income projects would be spread out among largely middle-class white neighborhoods. Fearing that Forest Hills would decay into a minority ghetto, the local residents formed the Forest Hills Residents Association to protest the plans.

As a compromise, the height of the towers was reduced to 12 floors, and 40 percent of the residents were to be elderly. Over the years, as the population within the projects aged, it became recognized as a NORC. In addition, the income requirements were higher than for most New York City Housing Authority (NYCHA) housing units. Residents were given "shares" of their units as owners, but they were forbidden from selling them to anyone but NYCHA. The Forest Hills Houses were the first co-operative public low-income housing in the city. On the site of the projects was also the Forest Hills Community House, which has programs for projects residents and neighbors of all ages.

Construction commenced in 1971 amid violent protests. In 1976, the buildings were completed. Until the early 1990s, the projects' population was largely white, elderly and Jewish. Following a 1992 investigation alleging discrimination, the white percentage of the residents has decreased, in favor of more minorities.

Tenants voted in 2017 to convert the public housing project into private rental units and leave NYCHA management. Residents then set up the Forest Hills Mutual Housing Association to manage the property and sold a portion of the site to nonprofit housing developer Phipps Houses for $8.5 million. Phipps will build two buildings, one 17-stories and the other 13-stories which would include community and parking space.

== See also ==
- New York City Housing Authority
- List of New York City Housing Authority properties
