= United States Post Office (Forest Hills, Queens) =

Historic post office in Queens, New York

- US Post Office-Forest Hills Station
- U.S. National Register of Historic Places
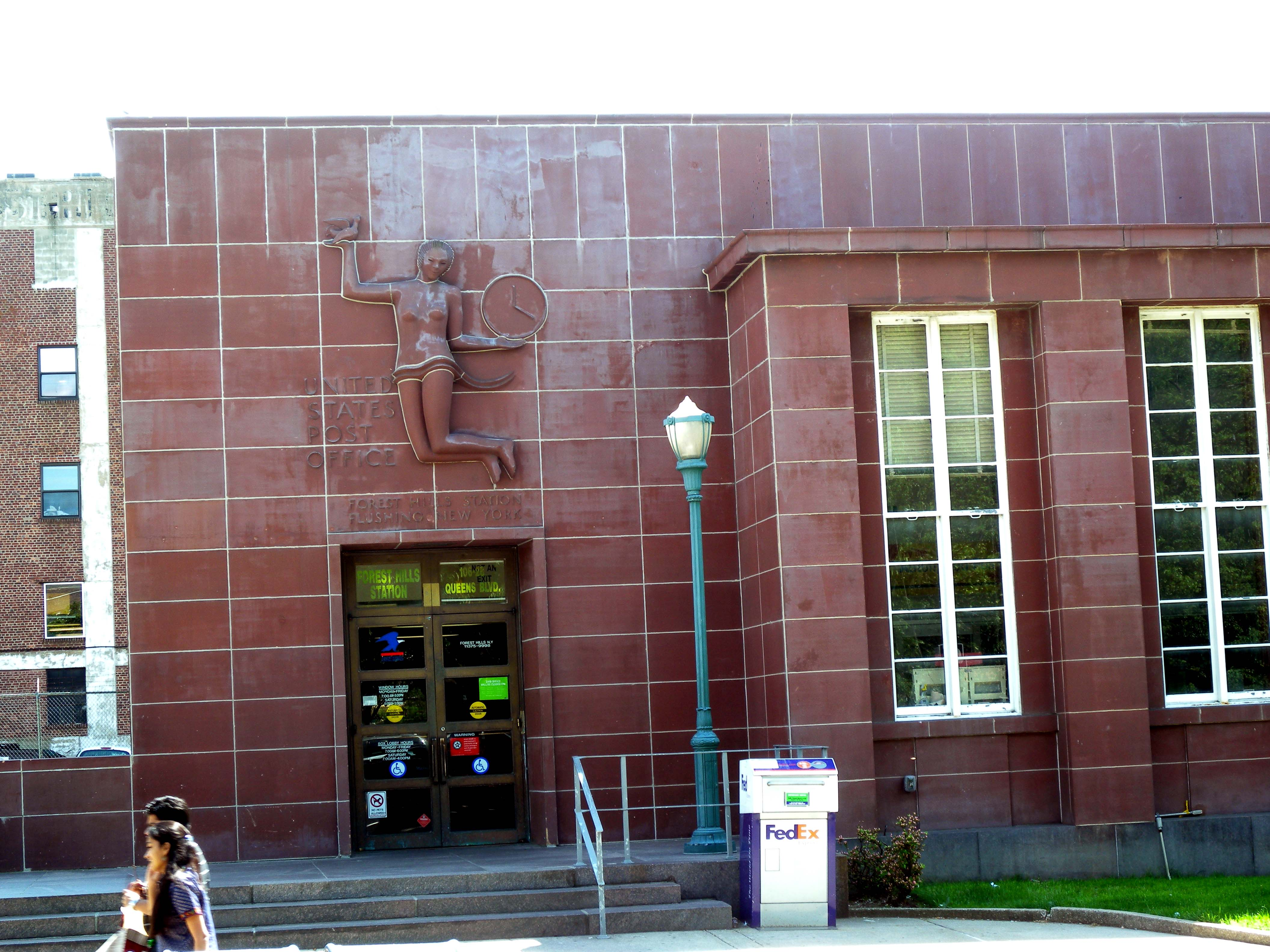
- Forest Hills Station, May 2009

- Location within New York City Location within New York Location within the United States
- Location: 10628 Queens Blvd., Forest Hills, Queens
- Coordinates: 40°43′18″N 73°50′50″W
- Area: less than one acre
- Built: 1937
- Architect: Lorimer Rich, Sten Jacobsson
- Architectural style: International Style
- MPS: US Post Offices in New York State, 1858-1943, TR
- NRHP reference No.: 88002503
- Added to NRHP: November 17, 1988

US Post Office-Forest Hills Station is a historic post office building located at Forest Hills in Queens County, New York, United States. It was built in 1937, and was designed by architect Lorimer Rich as a consultant to the Office of the Supervising Architect. It is a one-story flat roofed building clad with reddish brown terra cotta above a base of granite in the International style. It features exterior terra cotta relief sculptures by artist Sten Jacobsson.

The post office is located on the eastbound frontage road of Queens Boulevard (the former Hoffman Boulevard) on the southwest corner of 70th Avenue across from MacDonald Park. It was listed on the National Register of Historic Places in 1988.
