= Israel Knox =

American philosophy professor (1904–1986)

- Born: 1904; Russia
- Died: June 9, 1986 (aged 81–82); Manhattan

Academic background
- Education: Columbia University (PhD)
- Thesis: The Aesthetic Theories of Kant, Hegel, and Schopenhauer (1937)

Academic work
- Era: Contemporary philosophy
- Region: Western philosophy
- Institutions: New York University

Israel Knox (1904 – June 9, 1986) was an author and professor of philosophy at New York University.

== Life and works ==
He was born in Russia and came to the United States in 1912. He received his early education in New Haven and graduated from the City College of New York in 1932. In 1936, he earned his doctorate from Columbia University. Between 1937 and 1947, he served as director of the English-speaking division of the Workmen's Circle. From 1947 to 1951, Knox was a professor of philosophy at the Ohio University. Following that, from 1951 until his retirement in the late 1970s, he held a professorship in philosophy at New York University. Israel Knox died on Monday, June 9, 1986, at the Mount Sinai Medical Center, he was 79 years old and lived in Forest Hills, Queens.

In 1957, he published a biography titled Rabbi in America: The Story of Isaac M. Wise. Isaac M. Wise was the founder of American Reform Judaism.

=== Selected publications ===
- The Aesthetic Theories of Kant, Hegel, and Schopenhauer. Humanities Press. 1936.
- Rabbi in America the Story Isaac M Wise. Little, Brwona Anc Company. 1957.
