= Forest Hills, Queens =

Neighborhood in New York City

Forest Hills
- Neighborhood
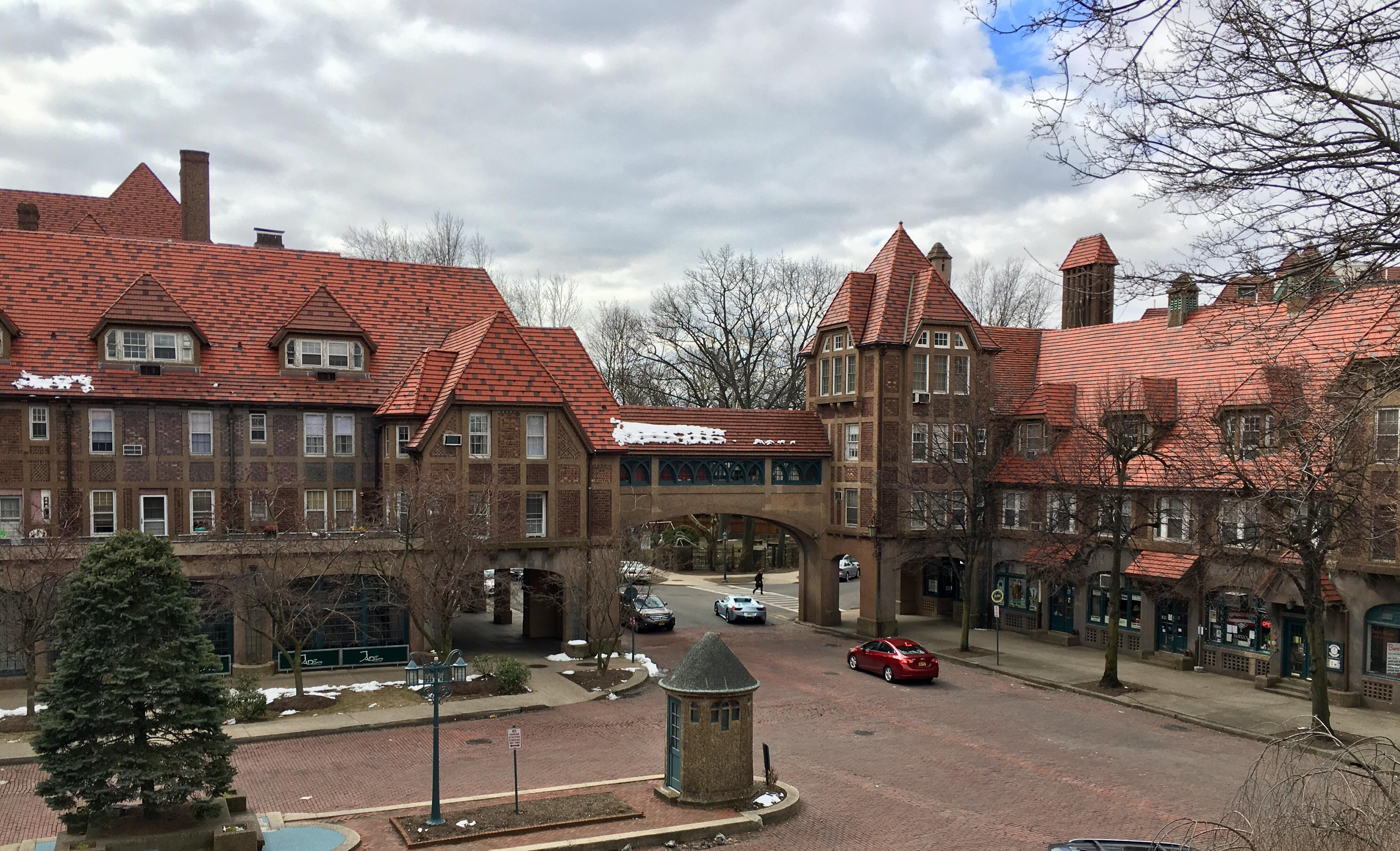
- Station Square
- Coordinates: 40.715°N 73.845°W
- Country: United States
- State: New York
- City: New York City
- County/Borough: Queens
- Community District: Queens 6

Area
  - Total: 2.6 sq mi (6.7 km^{2})
  - Land: 2.4 sq mi (6.2 km^{2})
  - Water: 0.2 sq mi (0.52 km^{2})

Population (2010)
  - Total: 83,728
  - Density: 34,886/sq mi (13,470/km^{2})

Ethnicity (2010)
  - White: 58.3%
  - Asian: 24.2%
  - Hispanic: 12.4%
  - Black: 2.5%
- Time zone: UTC−05:00 (EST)
  - Summer (DST): UTC−04:00 (EDT)
- ZIP Code: 11375
- Area codes: 718, 347, 929, and 917

Forest Hills is a neighborhood in the central portion of the borough of Queens in New York City. It is adjacent to Corona to the north, Rego Park and Glendale to the west, Forest Park to the south, Kew Gardens to the southeast, and Flushing Meadows–Corona Park and Kew Gardens Hills to the east. (Note: As in many New York City neighborhoods, the precise boundaries are disputed. The north, east, and south boundaries are the Long Island Expressway (LIE), Grand Central Parkway, and Union Turnpike, respectively. Google Maps shows the western boundary running roughly along 102nd Street, 67th Avenue, and the Long Island Rail Road's former Rockaway Beach Branch; while the Encyclopedia of New York City defines the western boundary as Junction Boulevard and the former Rockaway Beach Branch.)

The area was originally referred to as "Whitepot". The current name comes from the Cord Meyer Development Company, which bought 660 acres (270 ha) in central Queens in 1906 and renamed it after Forest Park. Further development came in the 1920s and 1930s with the widening of Queens Boulevard through the neighborhood, as well as the opening of the New York City Subway's Queens Boulevard Line. Forest Hills has a longstanding association with tennis: the Forest Hills Stadium hosted the U.S. Open from 1915 through 1977 and the West Side Tennis Club offers grass courts for its members. The area's main commercial street, Austin Street, has many restaurants and chain stores.

Forest Hills is located in Queens Community District 6, and its ZIP Code is 11375. It is patrolled by the New York City Police Department's 112th Precinct. Politically, Forest Hills is represented by the New York City Council's 29th District. It is located within New York's 6th congressional district, represented by Grace Meng.

== History ==
=== Development ===
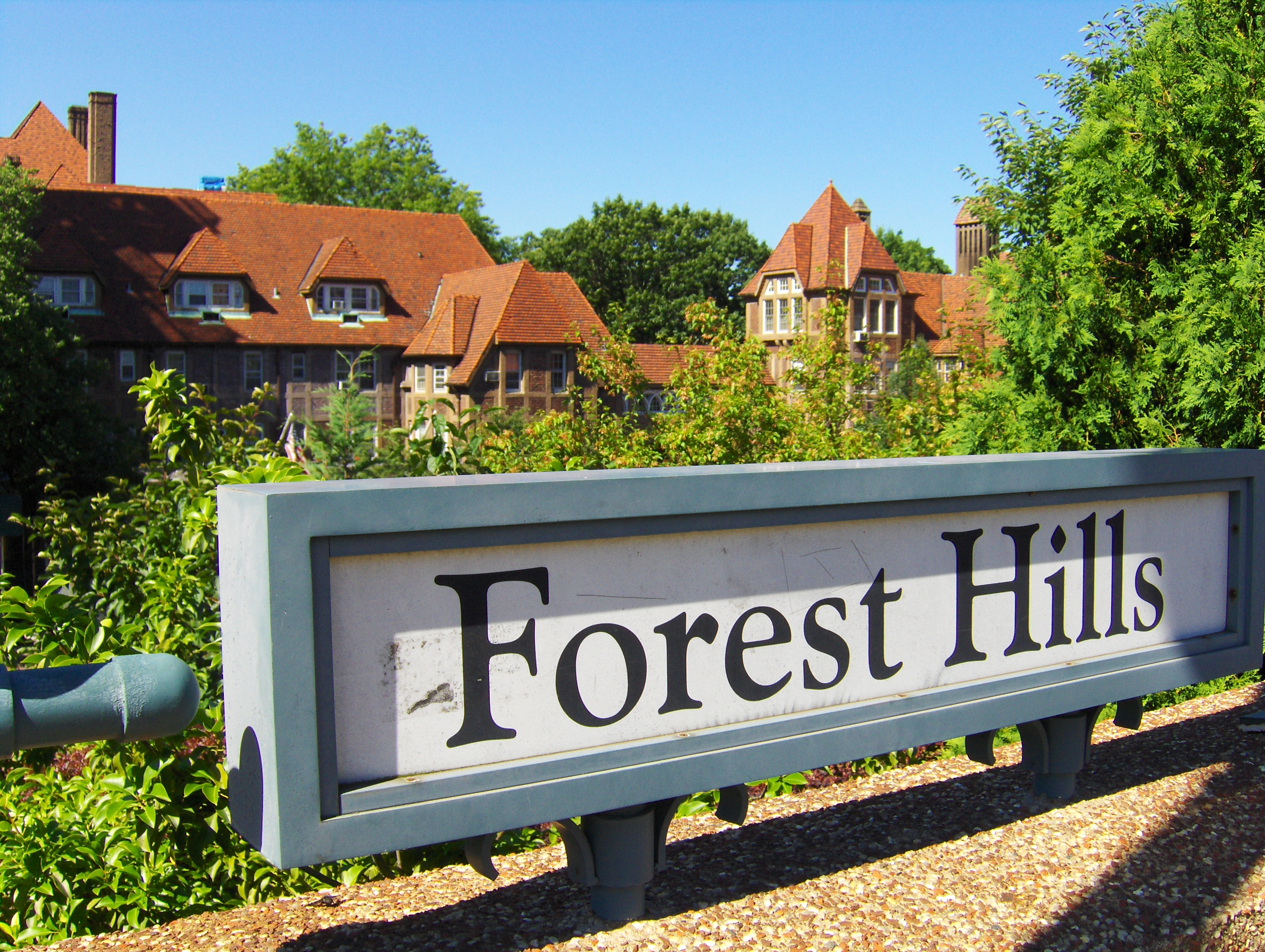
Station sign at Forest Hills station

The development of adjacent Forest Park, a park on the southern end of Forest Hills, began in 1895. Starting in 1896, the landscape architecture firm of Olmsted, Olmsted & Eliot was contracted to provide a plan for the park.

The inspiration came from the first garden city, Letchworth Garden City, started in 1903.

In 1906, the Cord Meyer Development Company, headed by Brooklyn attorney Cord Meyer, bought abutting land made up of six farms (those of Ascan Bakus, Casper Joost-Springsteen, Horatio N. Squire, Abram V. S. Lott, Sarah V. Bolmer, and James Van Siclen). The company then renamed the aggregate 600 acres (240 ha) "Forest Hills", after Forest Park. Single-family homes, designed by architects such as Robert Tappan and William Patterson, were constructed on the combined area. The roads of Forest Hills were laid out by 1910. The present-day Ascan Avenue in Forest Hills is named after Ascan Bakus.

Margaret Sage, the founder of the Russell Sage Foundation, bought 142 acres (57 ha) of land from the Cord Meyer Development Company in 1908. This land was to be used for "Forest Hills Gardens", a development on the southern side of Forest Hills.

=== Architecture ===
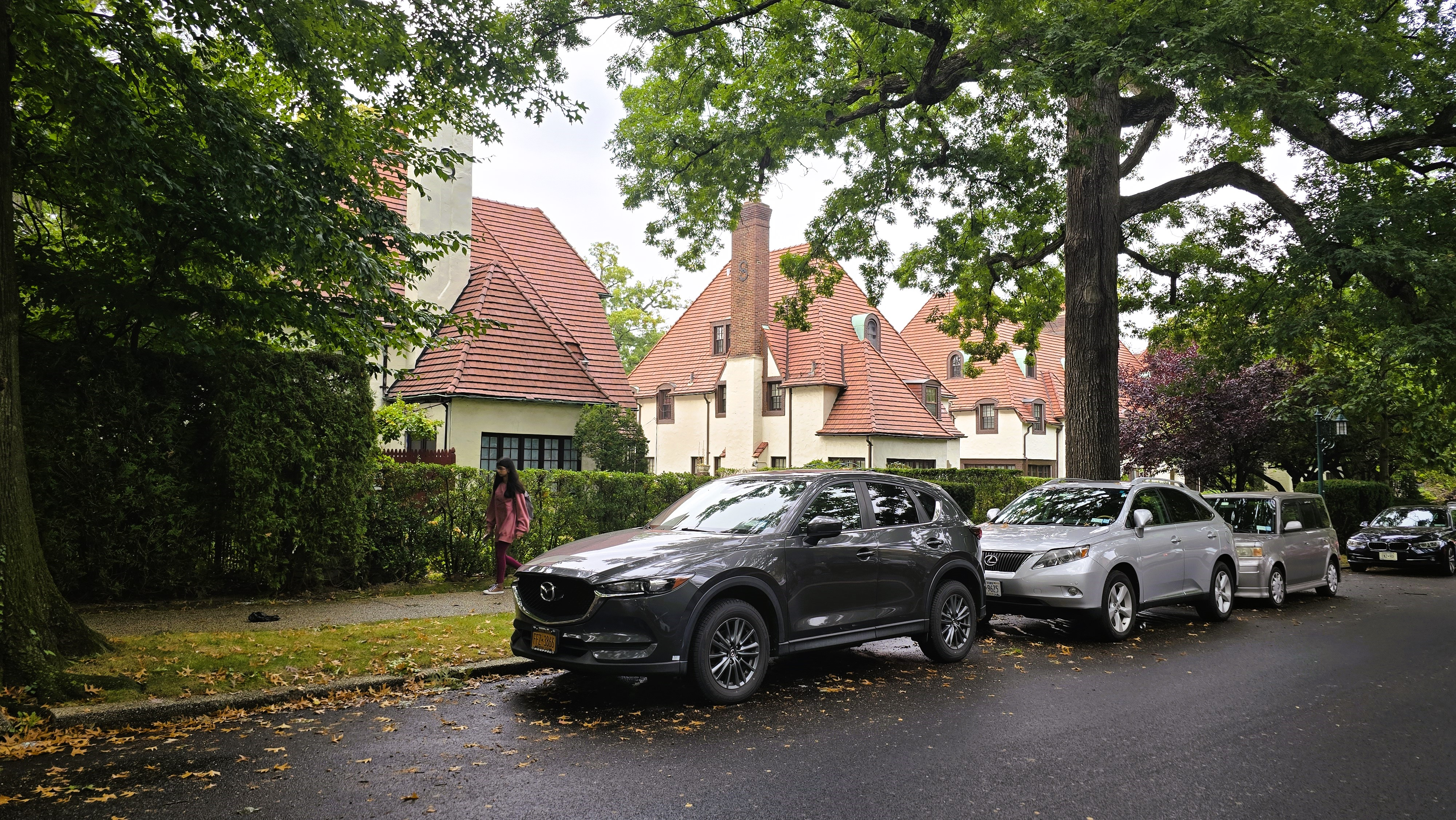
Homes in Forest Hills Gardens showing typical Tudor Revival architecture

Grosvenor Atterbury, along with his associate architect and Forest Hills resident, John Almy Tompkins II, was given the commission to design Forest Hills Gardens.

There are many Tudor Revival homes in Forest Hills, often featuring stucco walls and red Ludowici clay tile roofs. The most expansive buildings are in Forest Hills Gardens, but many are located in the area loosely bounded by 68th Avenue on the north; 72nd Road on the south; 108th Street on the west; and Grand Central Parkway on the east.

The construction of this area used a prefabricated building technique. Each house was built from approximately 170 standardized precast concrete panels, fabricated off-site and positioned by crane. The houses were mostly constructed between 1910 and 1917. To eliminate garbage piles on the curb, Forest Hills Gardens was designed with alleys, where small garbage trucks collected households' trash.

=== Growth and expansion ===
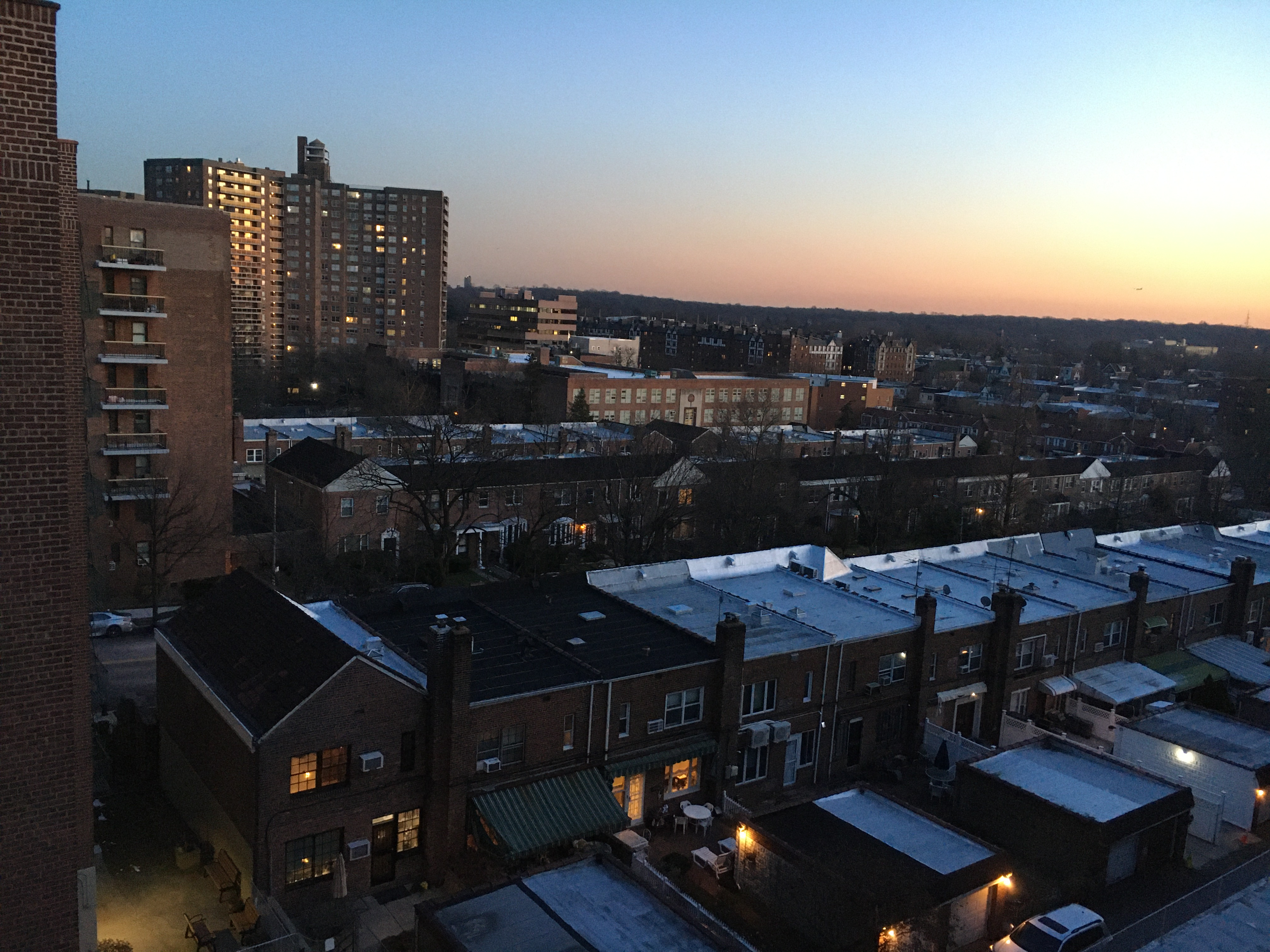
Southwestern Forest Hills at dusk

The Long Island Rail Road (LIRR) opened a station in Forest Hills in 1906, and the Queens Boulevard trolley line opened seven years later. The LIRR station was built with a brick courtyard, a clock tower, and arch-filled underpasses, fitting in with the Forest Hills Gardens section of the neighborhood. Since the railroad and trolley both connected to Manhattan, the presence of these two transportation options spurred development in Forest Hills.

In 1914, the West Side Tennis Club moved from Manhattan to Forest Hills Gardens. They constructed the Forest Hills Tennis Stadium, with approximately 13,000 seats, in 1923. The U.S. Open and its predecessor national championships were held there until 1978, making Forest Hills synonymous with tennis for generations. Forest Hills also had a golfing presence for a short time. The Queens Valley Golf Club started constructing a golf course in the neighborhood in 1922 and it was open by 1924. However, the club was closed in 1938 so that developers could build housing atop the site of the course.

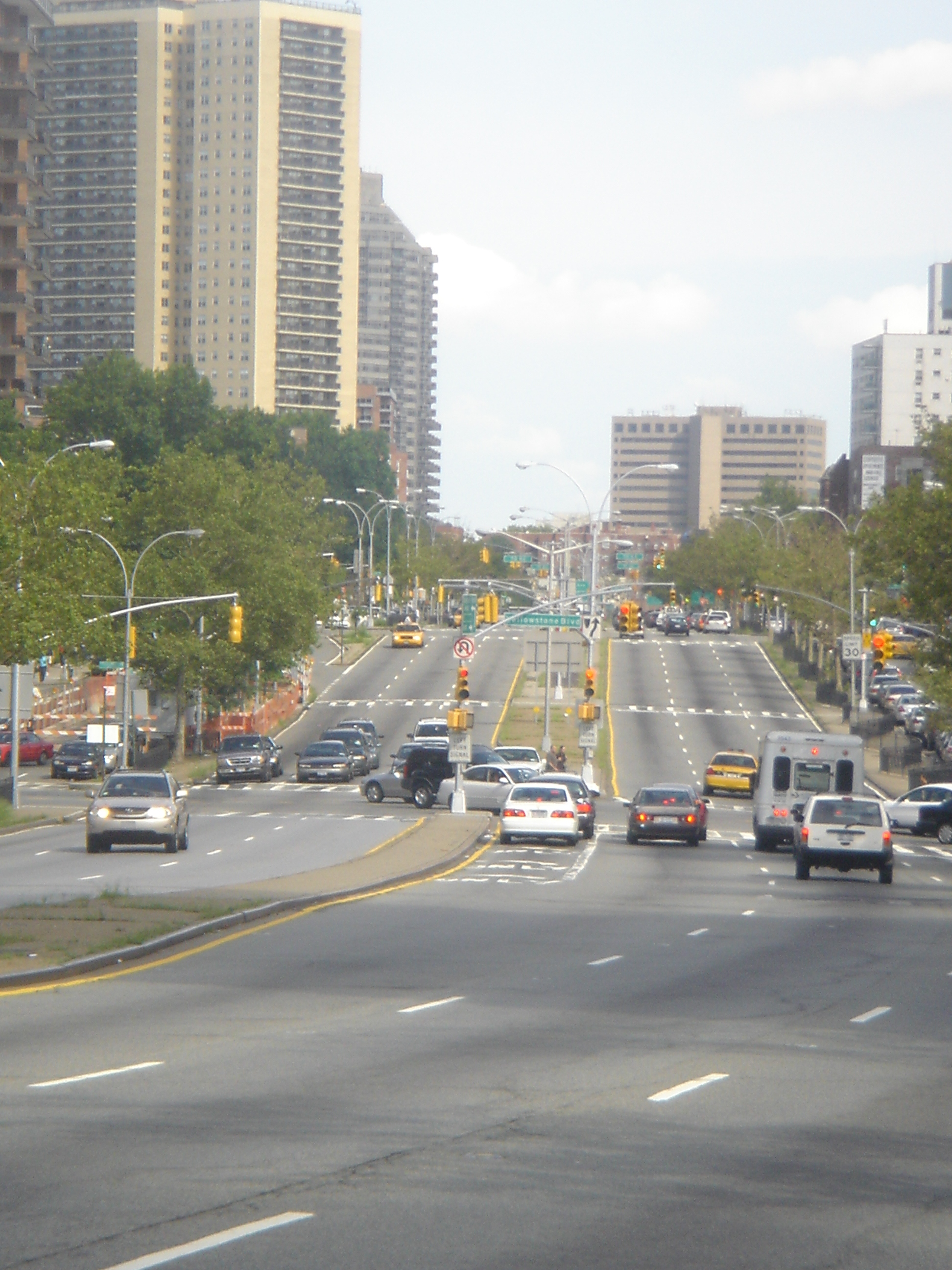
Queens Boulevard, looking eastward in 2006

Queens Boulevard was widened in the 1920s. Planning for a Queens Boulevard subway line started around this time. There were proposals for two stations in Forest Hills: an express station serving all trains on 71st Avenue, and a local station at 75th Avenue. During the late 1920s, in anticipation of the arrival of the subway, land was bought by developers and was built up. Zoning laws were changed to allow 15-story apartment buildings to be built, and made the neighborhood of Forest Hills a more desirable place to live, especially as it was an express stop. Queens Borough President George Harvey predicted that the introduction of the subway to Forest Hills would turn Queens Boulevard into the "Park Avenue of Queens." Excavation for the line started in 1931, and the two subway stops in Forest Hills opened in 1936 along with six other stations on the Queens Boulevard line.

The population nearly doubled in the late 1920s, increasing from 9,500 residents in 1927 to 18,207 residents three years later. By 1940, after the subway opened, the population had increased to 32,500 residents. By this time, development had largely stopped due to World War II, and about 25 empty lots in Forest Hills Gardens were developed after the war. At the same time, the single-family houses in Forest Hills were being razed to create new apartment buildings. The land in Forest Hills Gardens was fully developed by the 1960s, but there would still be empty lots in Forest Hills itself until the mid-1990s.

=== Later history ===
A small neo-Nazi group, the "United Nordic Confederation", led by resident George Leggett, was active in Forest Hills during the late 1950s. In 1958, the New York Police Department thwarted the group's plans to rob a bank in nearby Kew Gardens and seize funds for the construction of an upstate training camp.

In 1972 residents protested against Forest Hills Houses, a proposed public housing development with three 24-story buildings at 62nd Drive and 108th Street. It was part of Mayor John Lindsay "scatter-site" plan to construct public housing in neighborhoods that had none (as opposed to concentrating public housing in poor neighborhoods). White middle-class residents believed that the public housing would depreciate the community's quality of life because poor residents would move into the housing. Advocates for the project accused residents of racism, since the proposed development's residents would be mostly people of minority races. Lindsay garnered significant opposition due to the controversy surrounding Forest Hills Houses. Mario Cuomo, a lawyer and future Governor of New York, was assigned to mediate the dispute and succeeded in halving the size of the project. The New York City Housing Authority ultimately implemented a rigorous screening process for prospective residents of Forest Hills Houses, with quotas for elderly and poorer tenants.

During the 1970s and 1980s the neighborhood became more racially diverse. Discriminatory covenants for prospective Forest Hills Gardens residents were lifted, and immigrants from Iran, India, Israel, and the former Soviet Union started residing in Forest Hills.

== Demographics ==
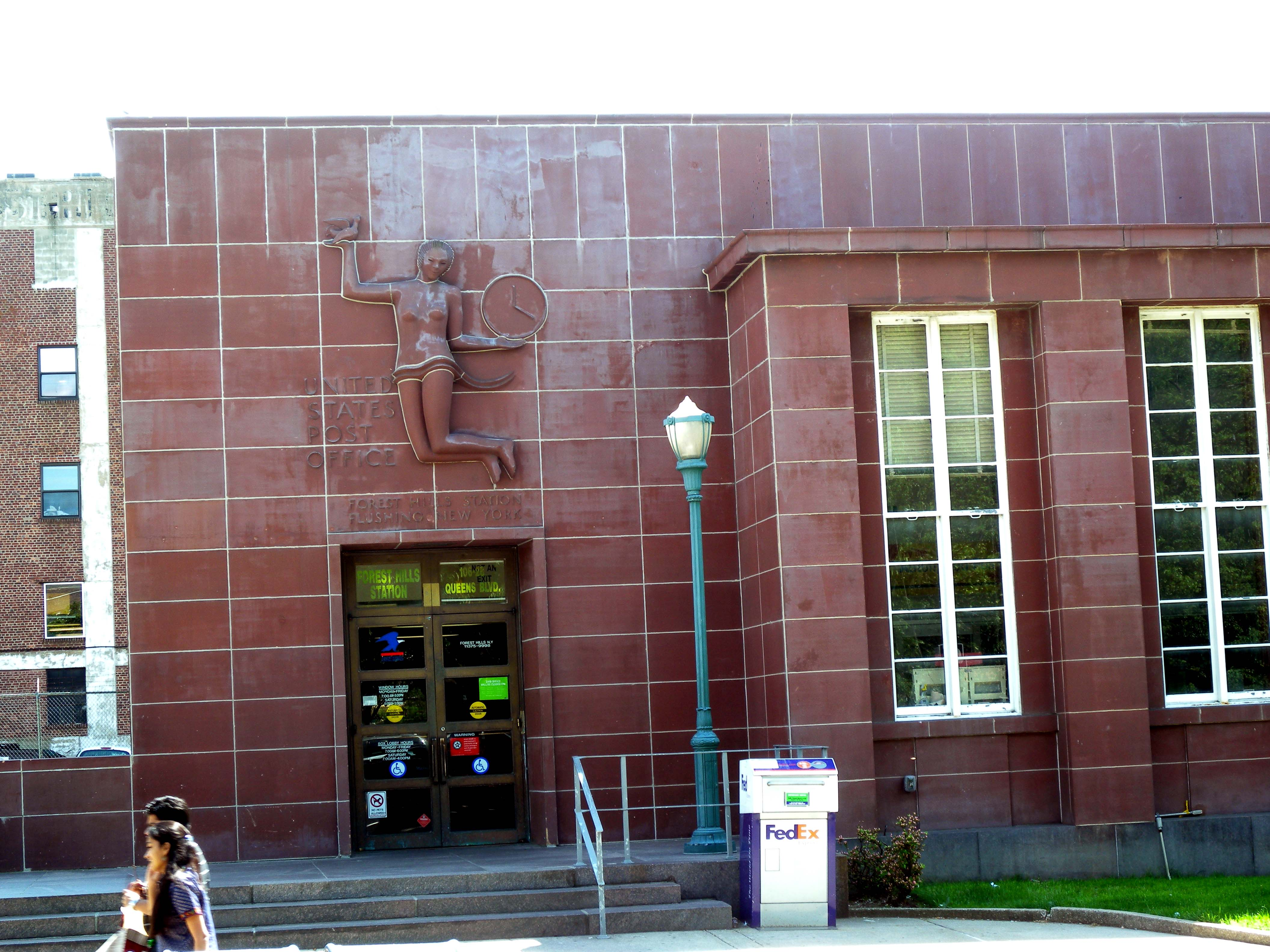
Post office, which displays a sports theme

Based on data from the 2010 United States census, the population of Forest Hills was 86,364, an increase of 1,318 (1.5%) from the 85,046 counted in 2000. Covering an area of 1,328.22 acres (537.51 ha), the neighborhood had a population density of 63.0 inhabitants per acre (40,300/sq mi; 15,600/km^{2}).

The entirety of Community Board 6, which comprises Forest Hills and Rego Park, had 115,119 inhabitants as of NYC Health's 2018 Community Health Profile, with an average life expectancy of 85.4 years. This is higher than the median life expectancy of 81.2 for all New York City neighborhoods. The plurality of inhabitants are middle-aged and elderly adults: 31% are between the ages of 25–44, 28% between 45–64, and 19% over 64. The ratio of young and college-aged residents was lower, at 16% and 5% respectively.

As of 2025, the median household income in Community Board 6 was $54,057. In 2018, an estimated 16% of Forest Hills and Rego Park residents lived in poverty, compared to 19% in all of Queens and 20% in all of New York City. One in seventeen residents (6%) was unemployed, compared to 8% in Queens and 9% in New York City. Rent burden, or the percentage of residents who have difficulty paying their rent, is 50% in Forest Hills and Rego Park, lower than the boroughwide and citywide rates of 53% and 51% respectively. Based on this calculation, as of 2018, Forest Hills and Rego Park is considered to be high-income relative to the rest of the city and not gentrifying.

=== Race and ethnicity ===
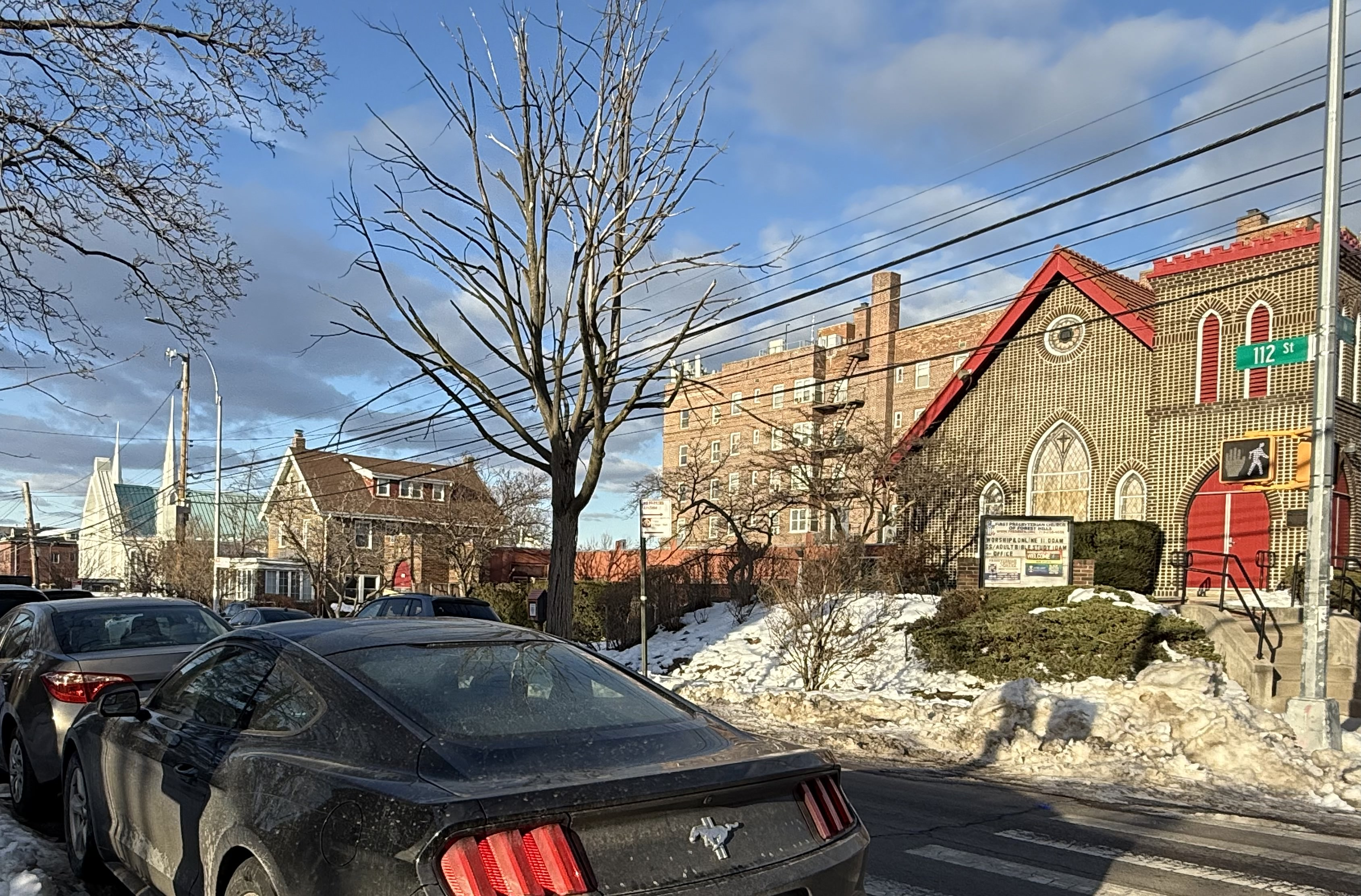
The First Presbyterian Church of Forest Hills (red door and roof), with the local Iglesia ni Cristo church (white and teal building) in the left background

Based on data from the 2010 census, the racial makeup of the neighborhood was 58.3% (48,822) White, 2.5% (2,086) African American, 0.1% (63) Native American, 24.2% (20,233) Asian, 0.0% (22) Pacific Islander, 0.4% (373) from other races, and 2.1% (1,719) from two or more races. Hispanic or Latino of any race were 12.4% (10,410) of the population. The Asian and Latino populations of Forest Hills experienced the most growth from 2010 to 2020.

While Forest Hills Gardens has historically been White and Christian, the rest of Forest Hills grew to be predominantly populated by Jews who had arrived from the Bronx and Brooklyn. By 1970, the neighborhood was estimated to be two-thirds Jewish.

In the present day, Forest Hills continues to have a significant Jewish population (~36%), although it is no longer a majority; many of these are Bukharian Jews, who have had a substantial presence in the neighborhood since the 1970s, especially in the 108th Street area. As of 2011, Forest Hills also has the largest concentration of Filipinos in New York City, at 44%. Furthermore, the neighborhood also has a significant, growing Chinese population, and has been referred to as a Chinatown.

== Land use ==
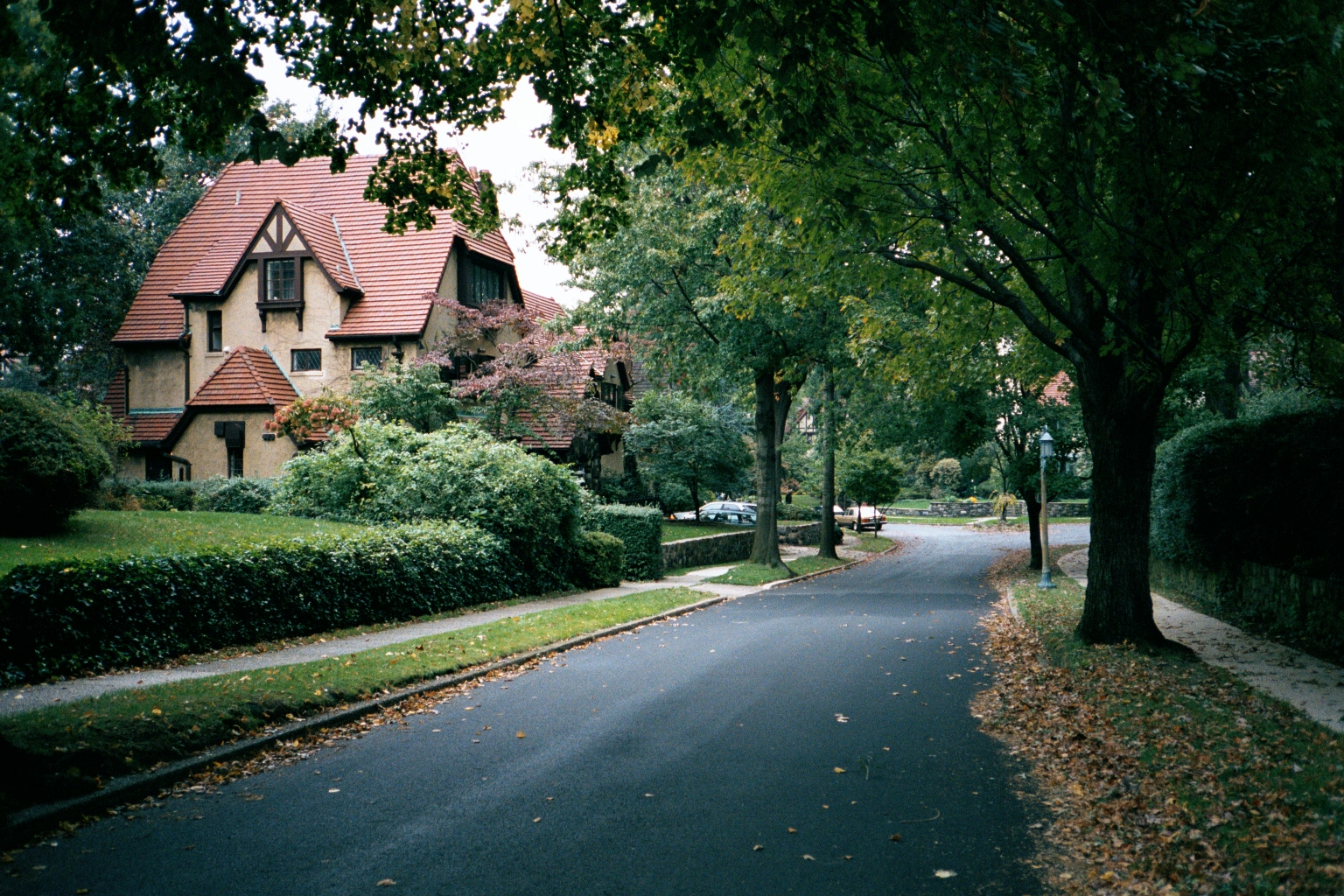
Forest Hills Gardens, part of Forest Hills

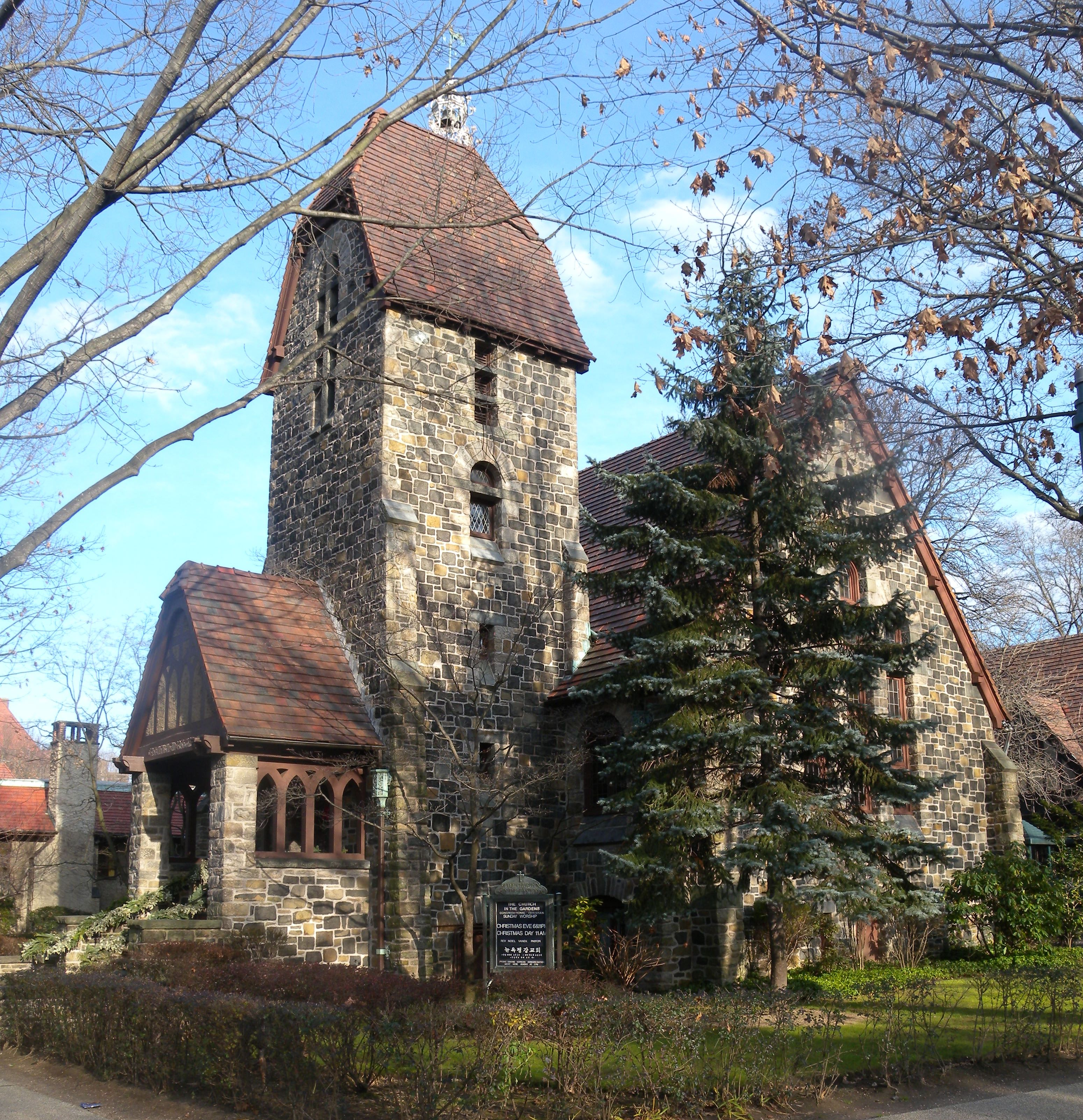
The Church-in-the-Gardens in Forest Hills Gardens

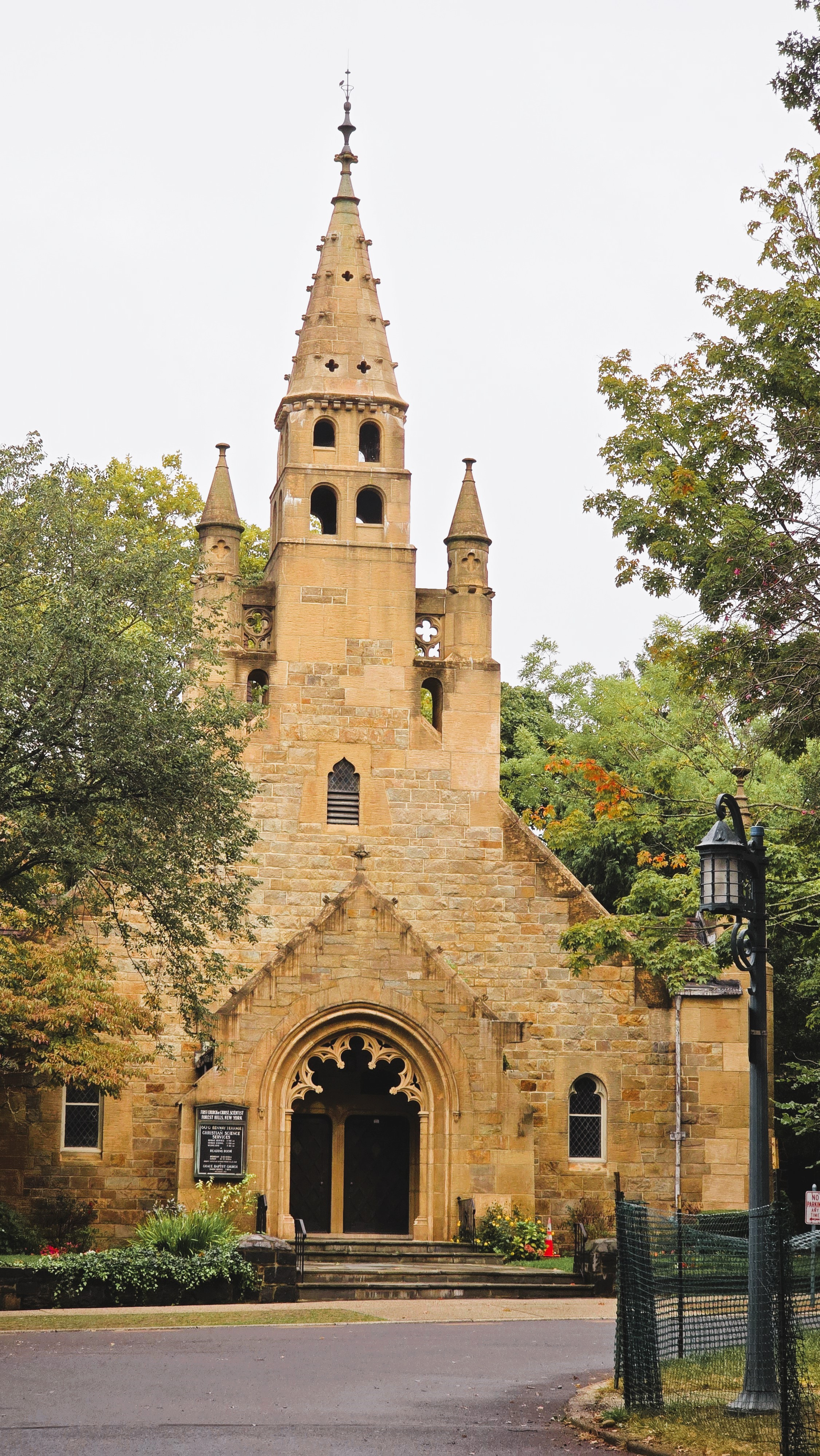
Grace Baptist with decorative streetlamp in Forest Hills Gardens, Queens

The southern part of Forest Hills has a particularly diverse mixture of upscale housing, ranging from single-family houses, attached townhouses, and both low-rise and high-rise apartment buildings. South of the Long Island Rail Road, the Forest Hills Gardens area is a private community that features some of the most expensive residential properties in Queens County. Until the 1970s, it was subject to restrictive covenants which, while containing no explicit economic, social or racial restrictions, effectively excluded "working-class people", as noted by Eric P. Nash in his 2002 New York Times book review of A Modern Arcadia. Forest Hills Gardens was named "Best Community" in 2007 by Cottage Living magazine. The adjacent Van Court community also contains a number of detached single-family homes. There are also attached townhouses near the Westside Tennis Center and detached frame houses near Metropolitan Avenue.

The north side of Forest Hills is home to the Cord Meyer community, which has detached single-family homes. Teardowns and their replacement with larger single family residences has had a significant impact on the architectural integrity of the area. However, the Bukharian Jewish community, whose members have settled in the area in large numbers since the late 1990s, advocating the changes say the bigger homes are needed for their large extended families.

On the northwestern edge of Forest Hills, on 62nd Drive and 108th Street immediately adjacent to the Long Island Expressway, is the Forest Hills Co-op Houses, a New York City Housing Authority low-income housing project. Its construction provoked controversy among the residents in the more prestigious areas of Forest Hills when it was constructed in the early 1970s.

The southeastern portion of Forest Hills contains Forest Hills South, a complex of 7 Georgian apartment buildings centered around a private English garden, which was formerly a mapped portion of 113th Street prior to the complex's construction in 1939. This enclave was designed by Philip Birnbaum.

Philip Birnbaum and Alfred Kaskel also designed and constructed numerous apartment buildings scattered throughout Forest Hills. These include the Grover Cleveland, the Van Buren Apartments, the Thomas Jefferson, the Maplewood, the Richard Apartments, the Stephen Apartments, the James Madison, the Cedar Apartments, the Howard Apartments, the James Monroe, the Nathan Hale, the St. Regis, the Roanoke, and the Kennedy House. Birnbaum and Kaskel's buildings largely remain standing, and are distinguished by their spacious lobbies, interior courtyards with fountains, curved brick corner terraces, and sunlit exposures. Other notable high-rise apartment buildings include the Continental (on 108th Street), the Pinnacle, Parker Towers (a 1,300-unit complex owned by the Blackstone Group), the Windsor and a 17-story luxury condo building completed in 2014, the Aston.

== Points of interest ==
Austin Street is a busy, modern street with shops, cafes, restaurants, and other stores that function as the center of Forest Hills.

Two monuments were erected in Forest Hills Gardens: one is a tribute to the victims of World War I and the other is the mast of the Columbia, the winner of the America's Cup yacht races in both 1899 and 1901.

The Church-in-the-Gardens, St. Luke's Episcopal Church, and United States Post Office are listed on the National Register of Historic Places.

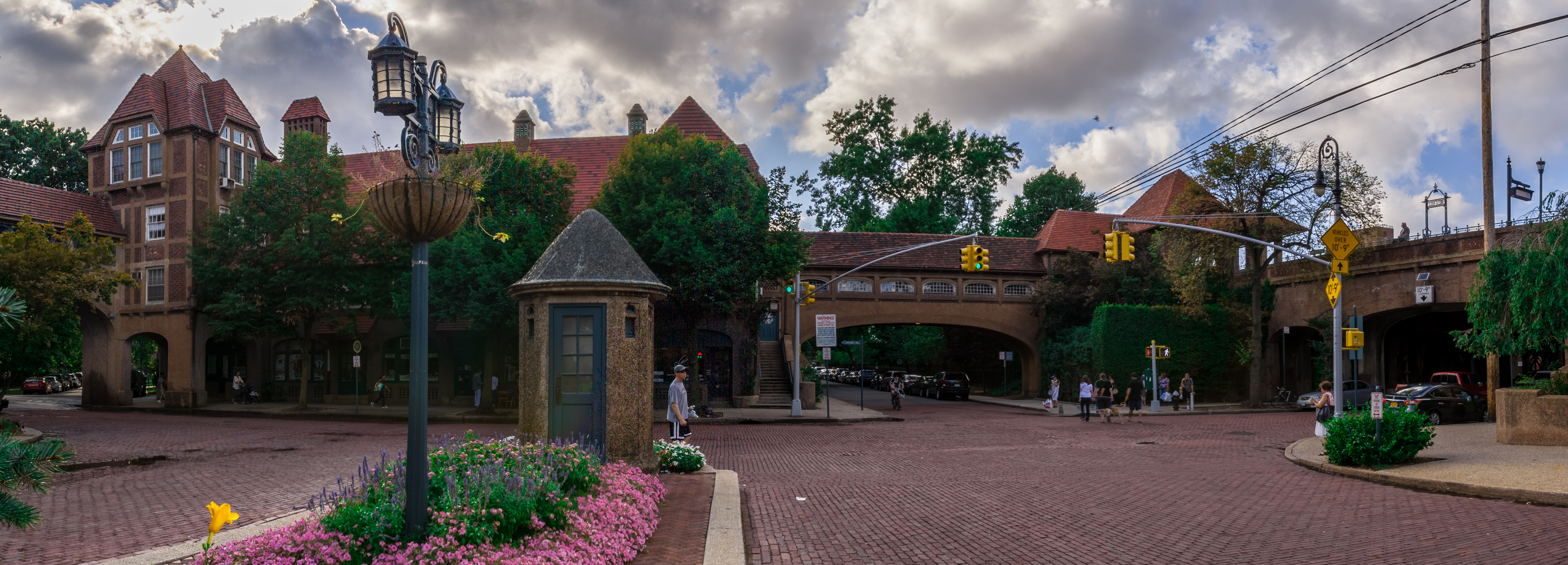
Panoramic view of Station Square, 2016

== Police and crime ==
Forest Hills and Rego Park are patrolled by the 112th Precinct of the NYPD, located at 68-40 Austin Street. The 112th Precinct ranked 6th safest out of 69 patrol areas for per-capita crime in 2010. DNAinfo attributed the area's low crime rate to its seclusion and reputation as a "suburb within the city". As of 2018, with a non-fatal assault rate of 14 per 100,000 people, Forest Hills and Rego Park's rate of violent crimes per capita is less than that of the city as a whole. The incarceration rate of 102 per 100,000 people is lower than that of the city as a whole.

The 112th Precinct has a lower crime rate than in the 1990s, with crimes across all categories having decreased by 91.5% between 1990 and 2018. The precinct reported 0 murders, 18 rapes, 41 robberies, 53 felony assaults, 69 burglaries, 403 grand larcenies, and 37 grand larcenies auto in 2018.

In May 2026, a crime spree of vandalism with antisemitic graffiti and swastikas in Forest Hills and Rego Park struck several synagogues, including Congregation Machane Chodosh and the Rego Park Jewish Center, along with homes, businesses and vehicles. New York public officials condemned the actions as hate crimes, including Governor Hochul as well as Mayor Zohran Mamdani, who called the incidents "a deliberate act of antisemitic hatred meant to instill fear". The New York City Police Department released video of four suspects sought in the incidents.

== Fire safety ==
Forest Hills has a New York City Fire Department (FDNY) fire station, Engine Co. 305/Ladder Co. 151, at 111-02 Queens Boulevard.

== Health ==
As of 2018, preterm births and births to teenage mothers are less common in Forest Hills and Rego Park than in other places citywide. In Forest Hills and Rego Park, there were 66 preterm births per 1,000 live births (compared to 87 per 1,000 citywide), and 4.6 births to teenage mothers per 1,000 live births (compared to 19.3 per 1,000 citywide). Forest Hills and Rego Park have a low population of residents who are uninsured. In 2018, this population of uninsured residents was estimated to be 11%, slightly lower than the citywide rate of 12%.

The concentration of fine particulate matter, the deadliest type of air pollutant, in Forest Hills and Rego Park is 0.0075 milligrams per cubic metre (7.5×10^{−9} oz/ft^{3}), equal to the city average. Ten percent of Forest Hills and Rego Park residents are smokers, which is lower than the city average of 14% of residents being smokers. In Forest Hills and Rego Park, 19% of residents are obese, 7% are diabetic, and 20% have high blood pressure—compared to the citywide averages of 20%, 14%, and 24% respectively. In addition, 11% of children are obese, compared to the citywide average of 20%.

Ninety-three percent of residents eat some fruits and vegetables every day, which is higher than the city's average of 87%. In 2018, 82% of residents described their health as "good", "very good", or "excellent", higher than the city's average of 78%. For every supermarket in Forest Hills and Rego Park, there are 5 bodegas.

Long Island Jewish Forest Hills is located in Forest Hills.

== Post office and ZIP Code ==
Forest Hills is covered by ZIP Code 11375. The United States Post Office operates the Forest Hills Station at 106-28 Queens Boulevard, the Parkside Station at 10119 Metropolitan Avenue, and the location at 101-19 Metropolitan Ave, Forest Hills, NY 11375. It was added to the U.S. National Register of Historic Places on November 17, 1988.

== Education ==
Forest Hills and Rego Park generally have a higher percentage of college-educated residents than the rest of the city as of 2018. The majority of residents (62%) have a college education or higher, while 8% have less than a high school education and 30% are high school graduates or have some college education. By contrast, 39% of Queens residents and 43% of city residents have a college education or higher. The percentage of Forest Hills and Rego Park students excelling in math rose from 42% in 2000 to 61% in 2011, and reading achievement rose from 48% to 49% during the same time period.

Forest Hills and Rego Park's rate of elementary school student absenteeism is less than the rest of New York City. In Forest Hills and Rego Park, 10% of elementary school students missed twenty or more days per school year, lower than the citywide average of 20%. Additionally, 91% of high school students in Forest Hills and Rego Park graduate on time, more than the citywide average of 75%.

Queens Community House provides free English classes to immigrants.

=== K–12 schools ===
==== Public schools ====
Forest Hills has the following public elementary schools which serve grades PK–5 unless otherwise indicated:

- PS 101 School In The Gardens
- PS 144 Col. Jeromus Remsen School
- PS 174 William Sidney Mount
- PS 175 Lynn Gross Discovery School
- PS 196 Grand Central Parkway
- PS 220 Edward Mandel
- PS 303 The Academy for Excellence through the Arts (grades PK–5)

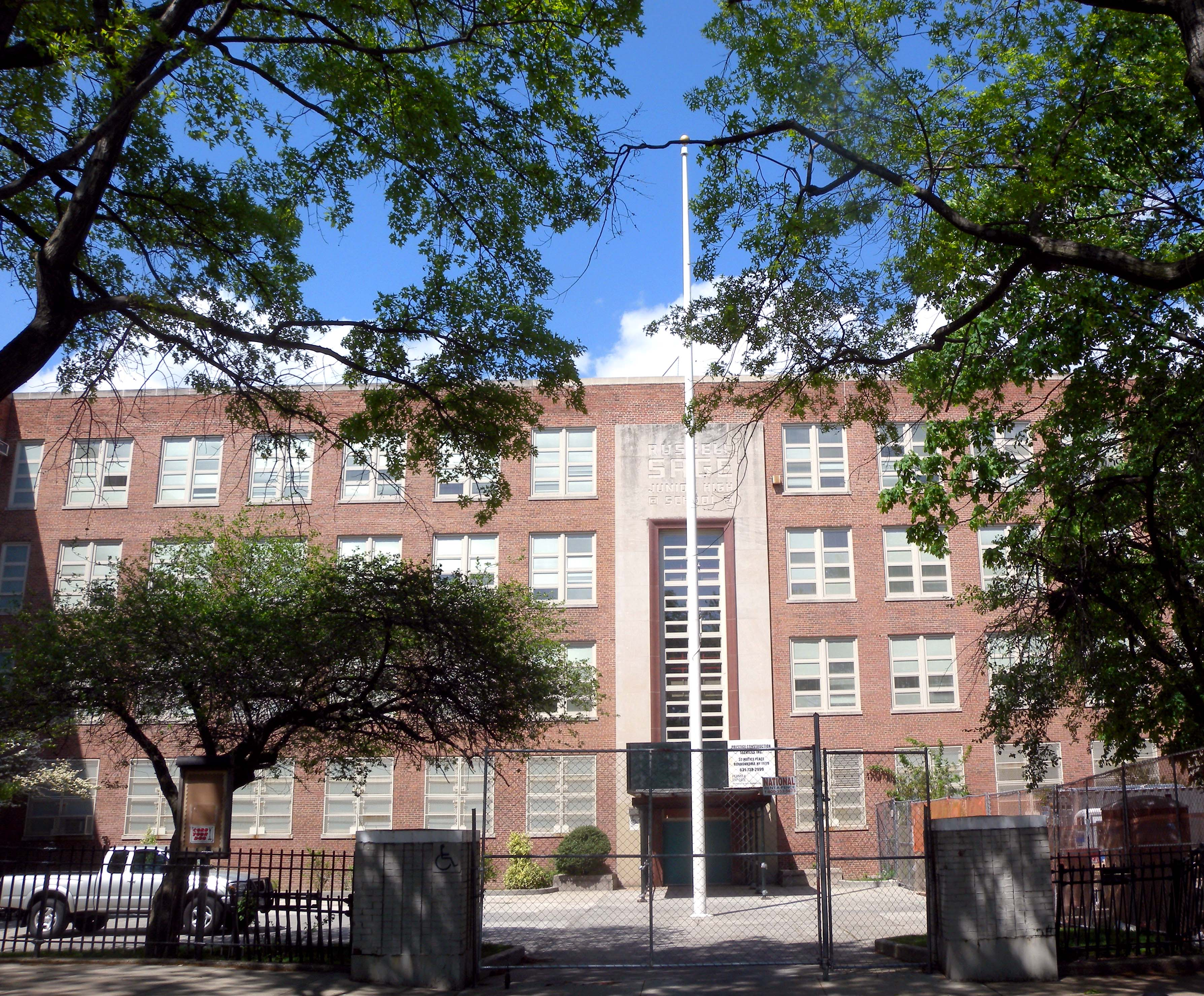
Russell Sage Junior High School

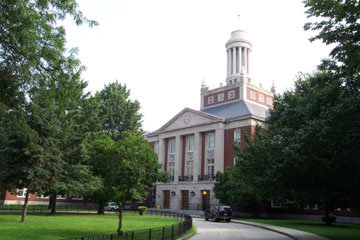
Forest Hills High School

The following public middle schools serve Forest Hills:

- JHS 157 Stephen A. Halsey (grades 6–8)
- MS 167 Metropolitan Expeditionary Learning School (grades 6–12)
- JHS 190 Russell Sage (grades 6–8)

There are no zoned high schools in New York City. The following high schools in Forest Hills serve grades 9–12:

- Forest Hills High School
- Queens Metropolitan High School

==== Private schools ====
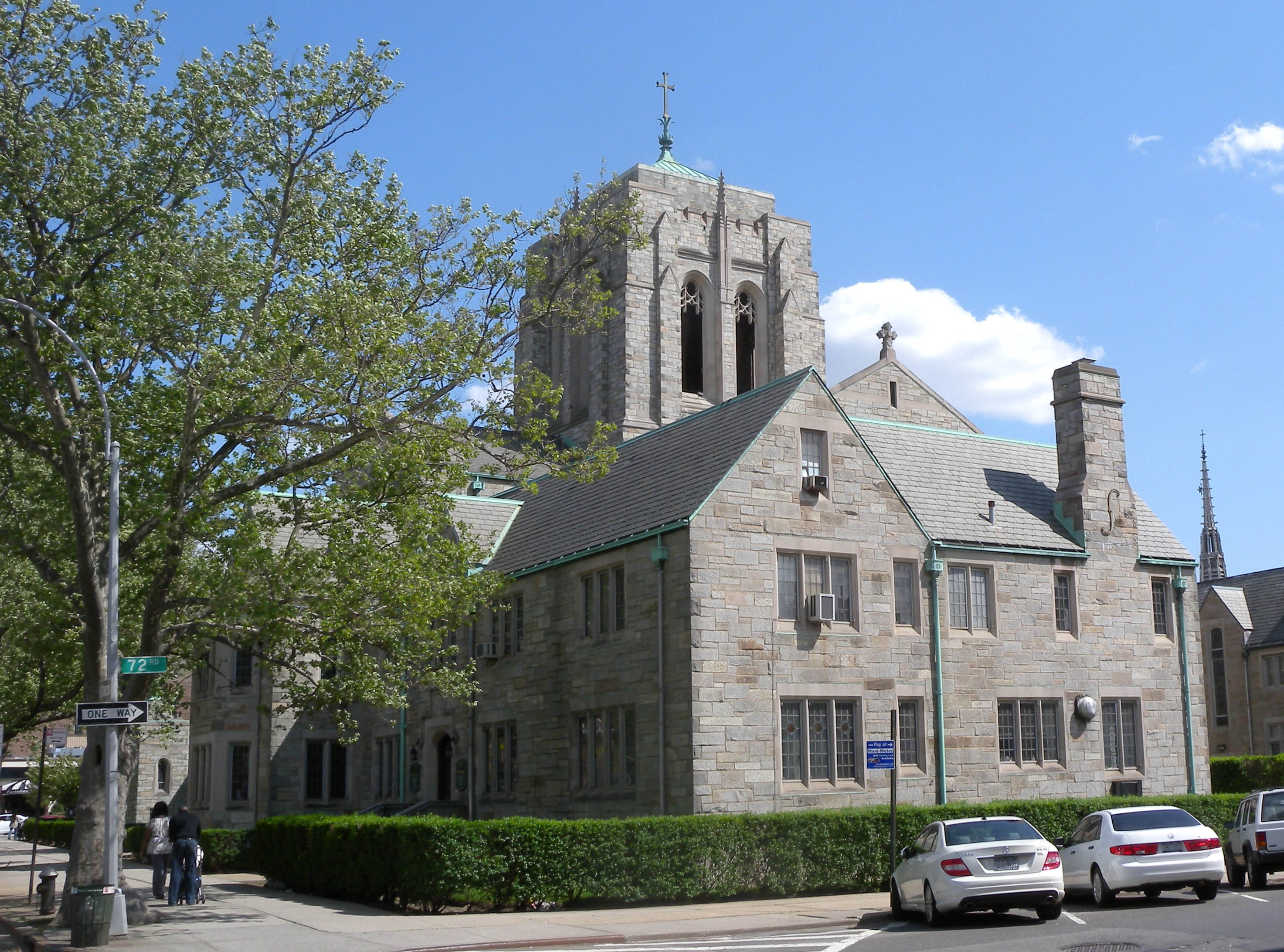
Our Lady Queen of Martyrs Roman Catholic Church

Private schools in Forest Hills include two Catholic schools (Our Lady of Mercy and Our Lady Queen of Martyrs) and The Kew-Forest School, an independent school. Also located in Forest Hills is Yeshiva Gedolah Lubavitch, an ultra orthodox Chabad high school and branch of Tomchei Temimim.

=== Colleges ===
Bramson ORT College was an undergraduate college operated by the American branch of the Jewish charity World ORT. Its main campus was in Forest Hills, with a satellite campus in Brooklyn. It closed in February 2017 after failing to meet standards set by the New York State Education Department Board of Regents and losing its accreditation. Touro College/NYSCAS has a branch location in Forest Hills. Plaza College, a small regionally-accredited college offering associates and bachelors degrees, is also located in Forest Hills.

=== Libraries ===
The Queens Public Library operates two branches in Forest Hills. The Forest Hills branch is located at 108-19 71st Avenue, while the North Forest Park branch is located at 98-27 Metropolitan Avenue.

== Transportation ==
=== Public transportation ===
The following MTA Regional Bus Operations bus routes serve Forest Hills:

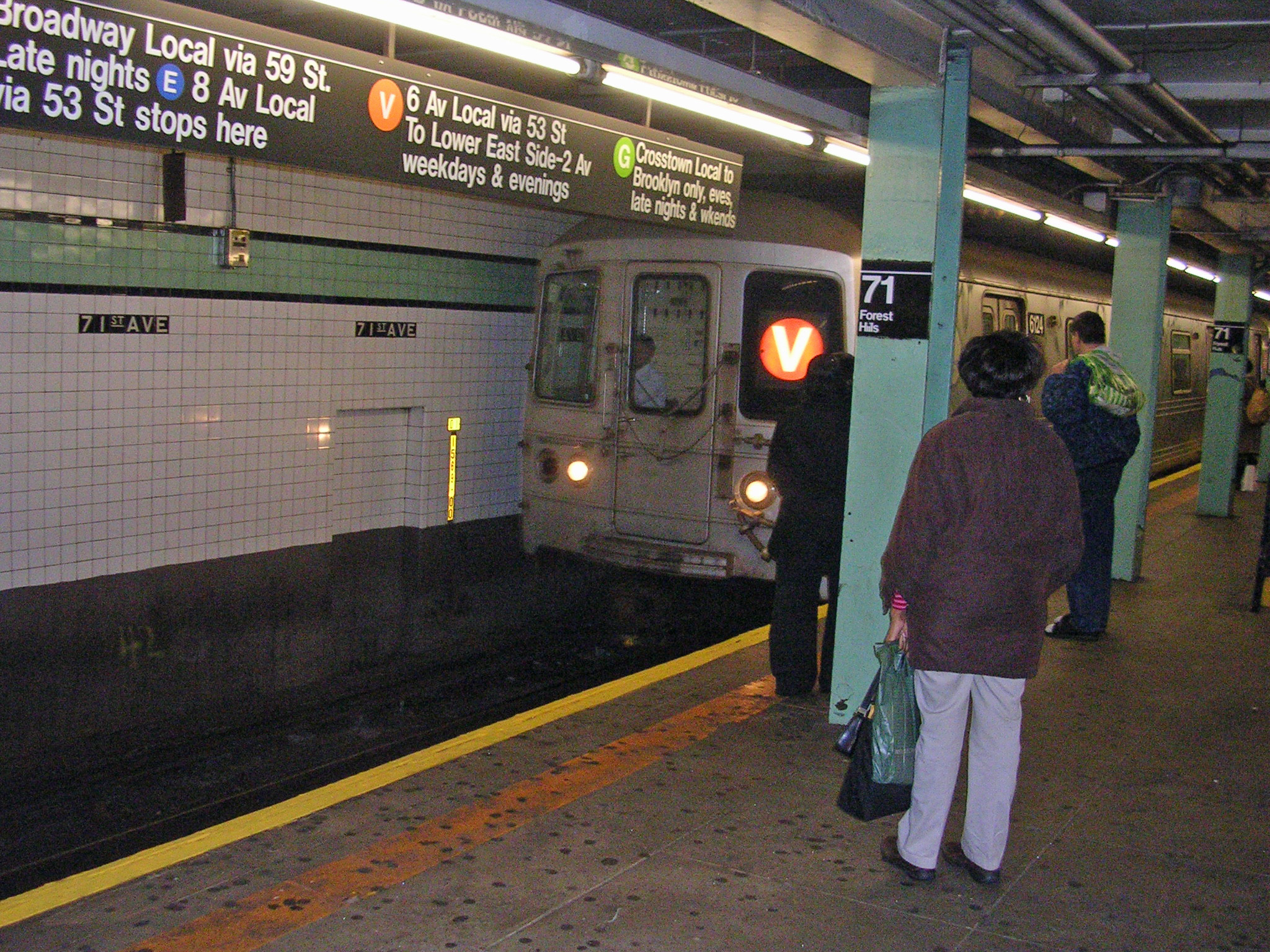
The subway station

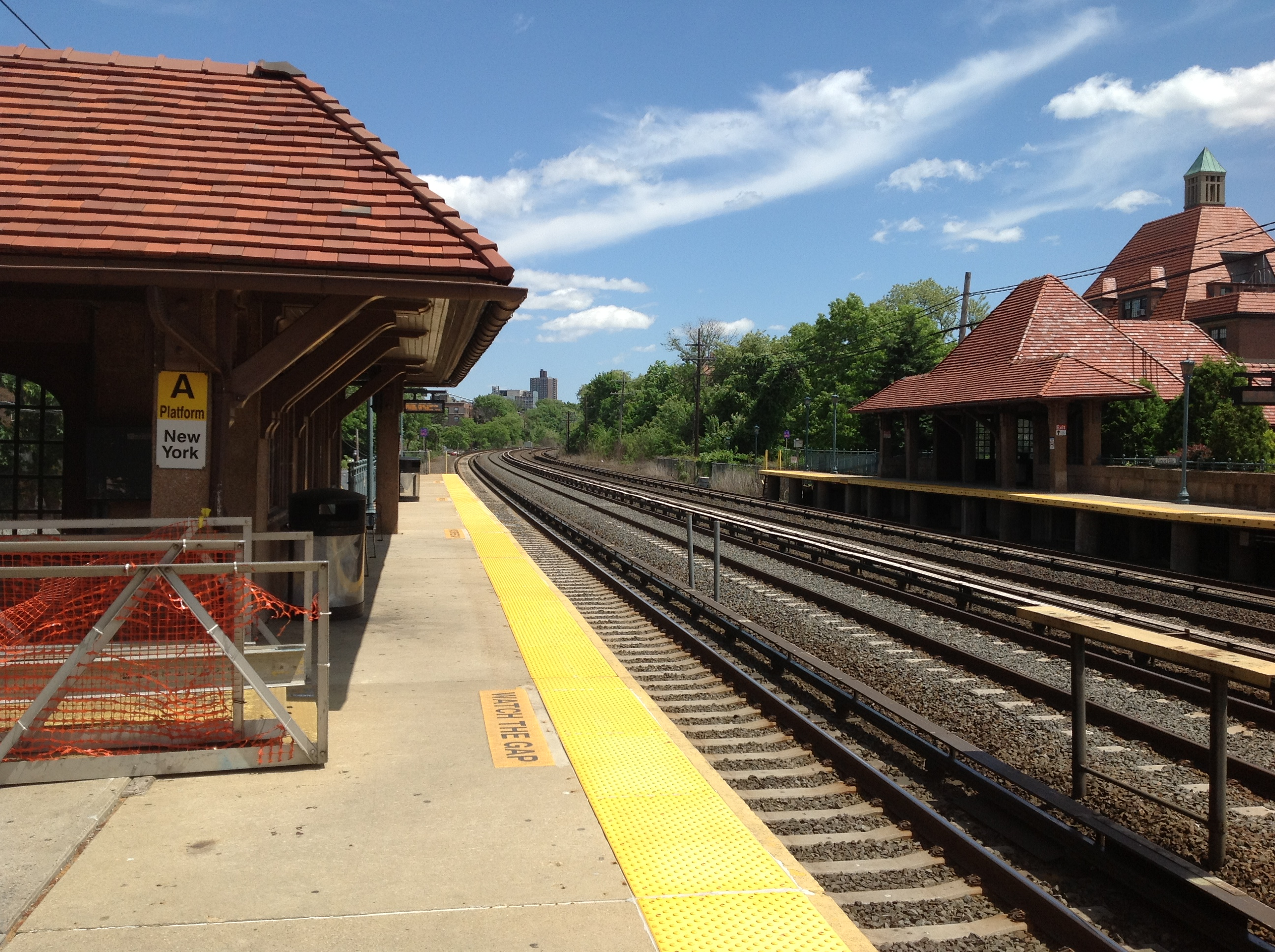
The LIRR station

- Q11: to Elmhurst or Old Howard Beach or Hamilton Beach (via Woodhaven Boulevard)
- Q23: to East Elmhurst (via 108th Street and 69th Avenue)
- Q38: to Maspeth (via 62nd Drive (to Maspeth), 63rd Road (to Forest Hills), 63rd Drive)
- Q52 SBS: to Elmhurst or Arverne (via Woodhaven/Cross Bay Boulevard)
- Q53 SBS: to Woodside or Rockaway Park (via Woodhaven/Cross Bay Boulevard)
- Q54: to Jamaica, Queens or Williamsburg, Brooklyn (via Metropolitan Avenue)
- Q60: to South Jamaica, Queens or East Midtown, Manhattan (via Queens Boulevard)
- Q64: to Electchester (via 69th Road/Jewel Avenue)
- Q74: to Queensborough Community College (via 69th Road/Jewel Avenue)
- Q88: to Elmhurst or Queens Village (via Horace Harding Expressway)
- Q98: to Ridgewood or Flushing (via Horace Harding Expressway)
- QM4: express to Midtown Manhattan (via 69th Road/Jewel Avenue, Sixth Avenue)
- QM10: express to Midtown Manhattan (via LeFrak City, Sixth Avenue)
- QM11: express to Lower Manhattan (via Queens Boulevard, LeFrak City, Water Street, Church Street)
- QM12: express to Midtown Manhattan (via Yellowstone Boulevard, Sixth Avenue)
- QM15: express to Midtown Manhattan (via Woodhaven Boulevard, Sixth Avenue)
- QM18: express to Midtown Manhattan (via Queens Boulevard, Sixth Avenue)
- QM40: express to Midtown Manhattan (via LeFrak City, Third Avenue)
- QM42: express to Midtown Manhattan (via Yellowstone Boulevard, Third Avenue)
- QM44: express to Midtown Manhattan (via 69th Road/Jewel Avenue, Third Avenue)
- BM5: express to Midtown Manhattan (via Woodhaven Boulevard, Madison Avenue)

The following New York City Subway stations serve Forest Hills:

- 67th Avenue (M and R trains)
- Forest Hills–71st Avenue (E, F, <F>, M, and R trains)
- 75th Avenue (E, F, and <F> trains)
- Kew Gardens–Union Turnpike (E, F, and <F> trains)

Forest Hills is home to the eponymous LIRR station, which is located on Continental Avenue. The southern part of the neighborhood is also close to the Kew Gardens station in neighboring Kew Gardens.

=== Road ===
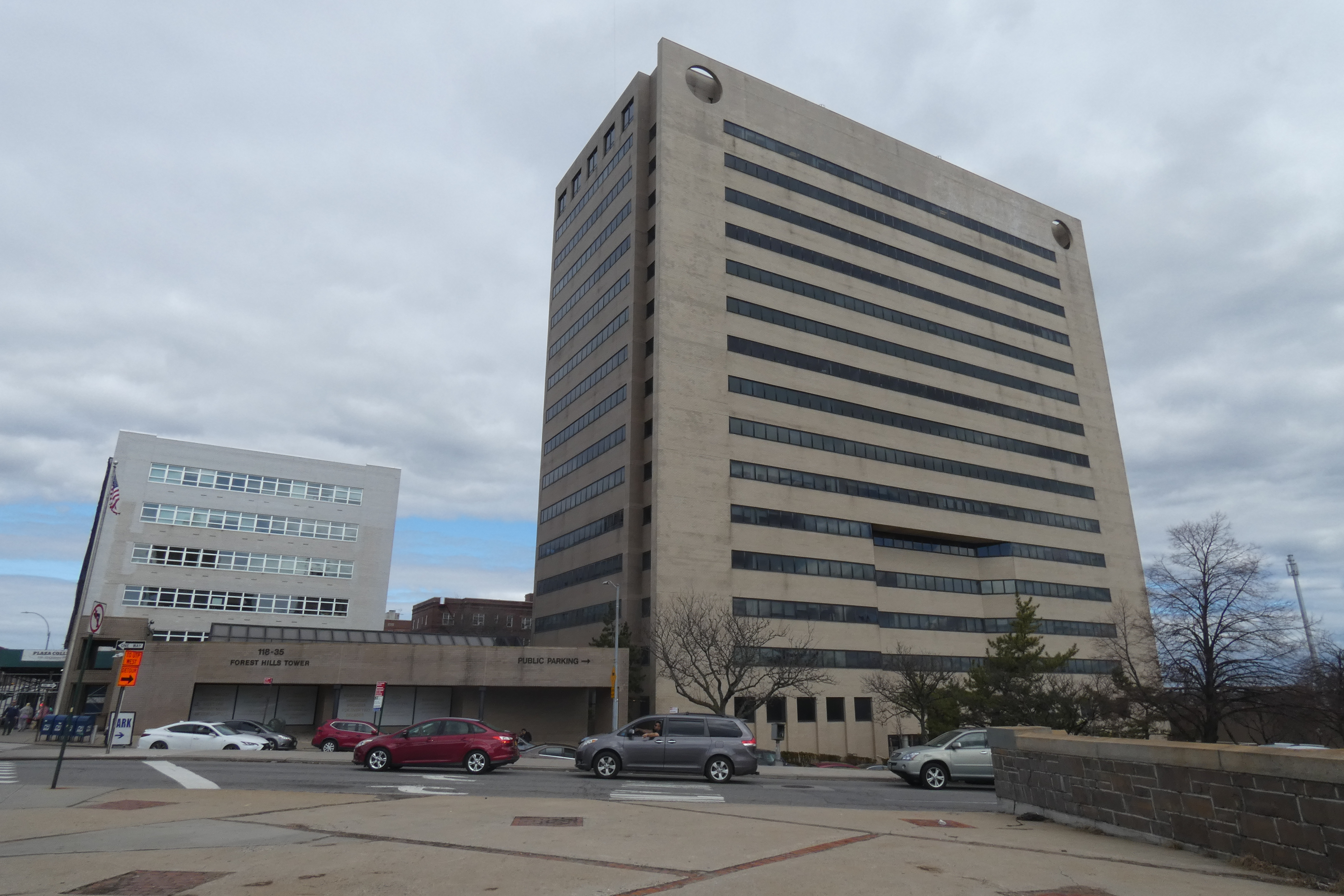
JetBlue's former headquarters on Queens Boulevard

The main thoroughfare is Queens Boulevard. The street's width and complexity have led to a large number of pedestrian deaths, earning it the moniker "Boulevard of Death". Metropolitan Avenue is known for its antique shops. The commercial heart of Forest Hills is a mile-long stretch of Austin Street between Yellowstone Boulevard and Ascan Avenue: the latter thoroughfare was named in 1909 by developer Frederick Backus for his own father, Ascan Backus II.

Other thoroughfares include 108th Street, which goes to East Elmhurst and terminates at Queens Boulevard at a junction with 71st Avenue and Continental Avenue, Grand Central Parkway, which goes to the Triboro Bridge and Eastern Long Island, and the Long Island Expressway, also known as I-495, or abbreviated to the LIE, which goes to the Midtown Tunnel towards Manhattan, and terminates at Riverhead in Eastern Long Island.

== Parks and recreation ==
Forest Hills is bordered by two of the largest parks in Queens managed by the New York City Department of Parks and Recreation: the 870-acre (3.5 km^{2}) Flushing Meadows–Corona Park, which is the site of two World's Fairs (in 1939 and 1964) and the iconic Unisphere; as well as the 507-acre (2.05 km^{2}) Forest Park. Within Forest Hills, parks and playgrounds include the Yellowstone Municipal Park – Katzman Playground (located on Yellowstone Boulevard, between 68th Avenue and 68th Road); the Annadale Playground (located on Yellowstone Boulevard, between 64th Road and 65th Avenue); the Willow Lake Playground (located off the Grand Central Parkway, between 71st and 72nd Avenues); the Ehrenreich-Austin Playground (located on Austin Street, between 76th Avenue and 76th Drive); and the Russell Sage Playground (located on 68th Avenue, between Booth and Austin Streets).

Access to Flushing Meadows-Corona Park is limited by the Grand Central Parkway, which bisects the neighborhood and the park itself. Pedestrian access over the Grand Central Parkway is available at Horace Harding Expressway, 64th Avenue, Jewel Avenue, and 72nd Road. A shuttered entrance at 78th Avenue, which previously led to Willow Lake and provided pedestrian access to the rest of the park as well as neighboring Kew Gardens Hills, has been closed since 2001. The ballfields and the playground that once surrounded the lake have long been abandoned and neglected by the Parks Department.

== Economy ==
Forest Hills is primarily a residential neighborhood that includes a number of restaurants, small businesses, and grocery stores, many of them located on Austin Street, one of the area's main shopping districts. The neighborhood has two Trader Joe's supermarkets, one at the intersection of Queens and Yellowstone boulevards and another on Metropolitan Avenue, and a small Target on Austin Street. There is an independent movie theater, Cinemart Cinemas, located on Metropolitan Avenue.

== In popular culture ==
=== Sports ===
The U.S. Open tennis tournament was first held at the West Side Tennis Club from 1915 until 1977, when it was relocated to the USTA Billie Jean King National Tennis Center in Flushing Meadows–Corona Park, about 4 miles (6.4 km) away. When the Open was played at the tennis stadium, the tournament was commonly referred to colloquially as "Forest Hills."

=== Film ===
A pivotal scene in Alfred Hitchcock's 1951 film Strangers on a Train, in which Farley Granger's character is a professional tennis player, features a lengthy championship game at the West Side Tennis Club, which was filmed there while the 1950 Davis Cup finals were being played.

In the 2001 movie The Royal Tenenbaums, Luke Wilson's character plays a tennis match at the club.

=== Comics ===
Forest Hills was featured as the home setting for the comic book superhero Spider-Man, where under the alias Peter Parker he grew up at 20 Ingram Street (40.712805°N 73.843281°W). In the comics, the home was depicted as a modest two-story boarding house run by his Aunt May.In October 2026, Ingram Street was renamed Spider-Man Way in front of the house with the address 20 Ingram Street by The New York City Council.

=== Music ===
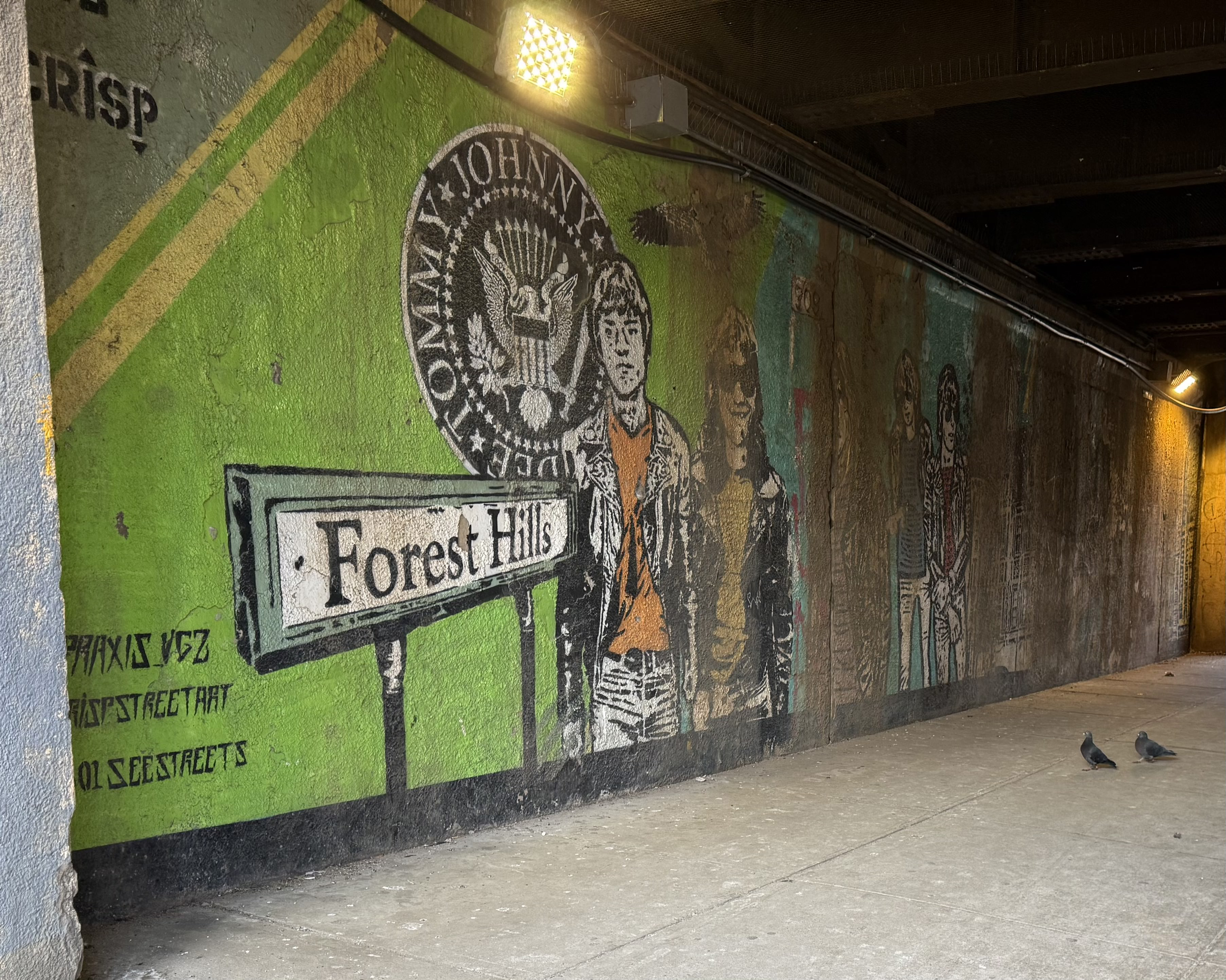
Two pigeons observe the Ramones mural on 71st Avenue under the LIRR

The Ramones were formed in Forest Hills. The band was recognized with the designation in 2017 of Ramones Way at 67th Avenue and 110th Street, in front of Forest Hills High School.

Simon and Garfunkel both graduated from Forest Hills High School in 1958. The duo performed at Forest Hills Stadium in 1966, 1967, 1968, and two nights in 1970. Paul Simon returned once again to Forest Hills Stadium in 2016 during his Homeward Bound farewell tour and has scheduled a performance there in 2026, his first date in the borough since performing in Flushing Meadows–Corona Park in 2018.

Billy Eichner wrote the parody song "Forest Hills State of Mind" about the neighborhood.

=== Video games ===
The 2008 Rockstar Games open-world action-adventure/crime game Grand Theft Auto IV, which is set in a parody of New York City called Liberty City, features a parody of Forest Hills called Meadow Hills, located in the borough of Dukes, the GTA equivalent of Queens. It also features a parody of the Forest Hills Station called Lynch Street Station, though in the game it's utilized as a station for the Liberty City Subway system (based on the New York City Subway system) rather than its real-life usage as a Long Island Rail Road station.

=== Theatre ===
The 2024 off-Broadway drama The Other Americans, written by John Leguizamo, is about a Colombian family who moves from Jackson Heights to Forest Hills in 1998.

== Notable people ==
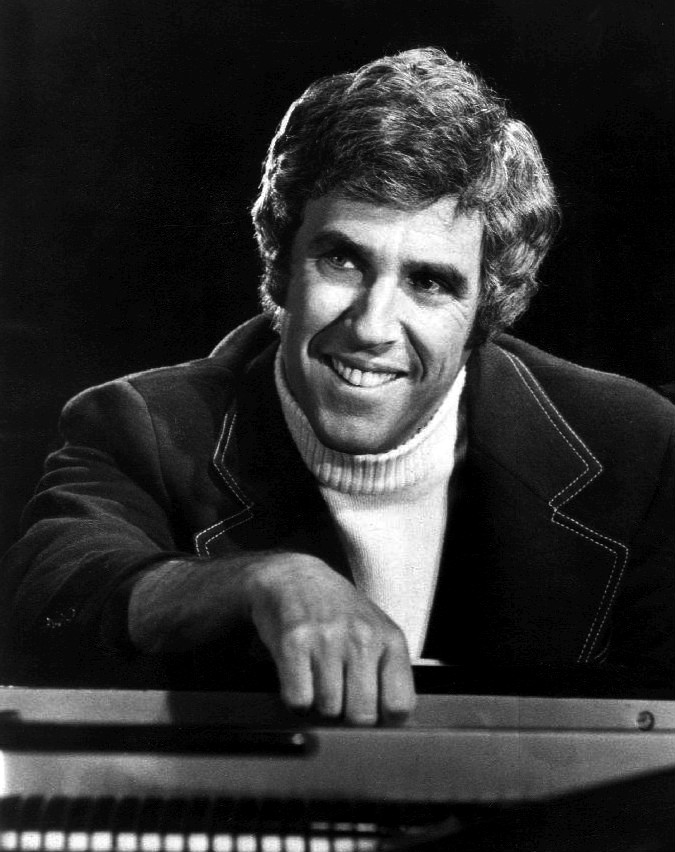
Burt Bacharach

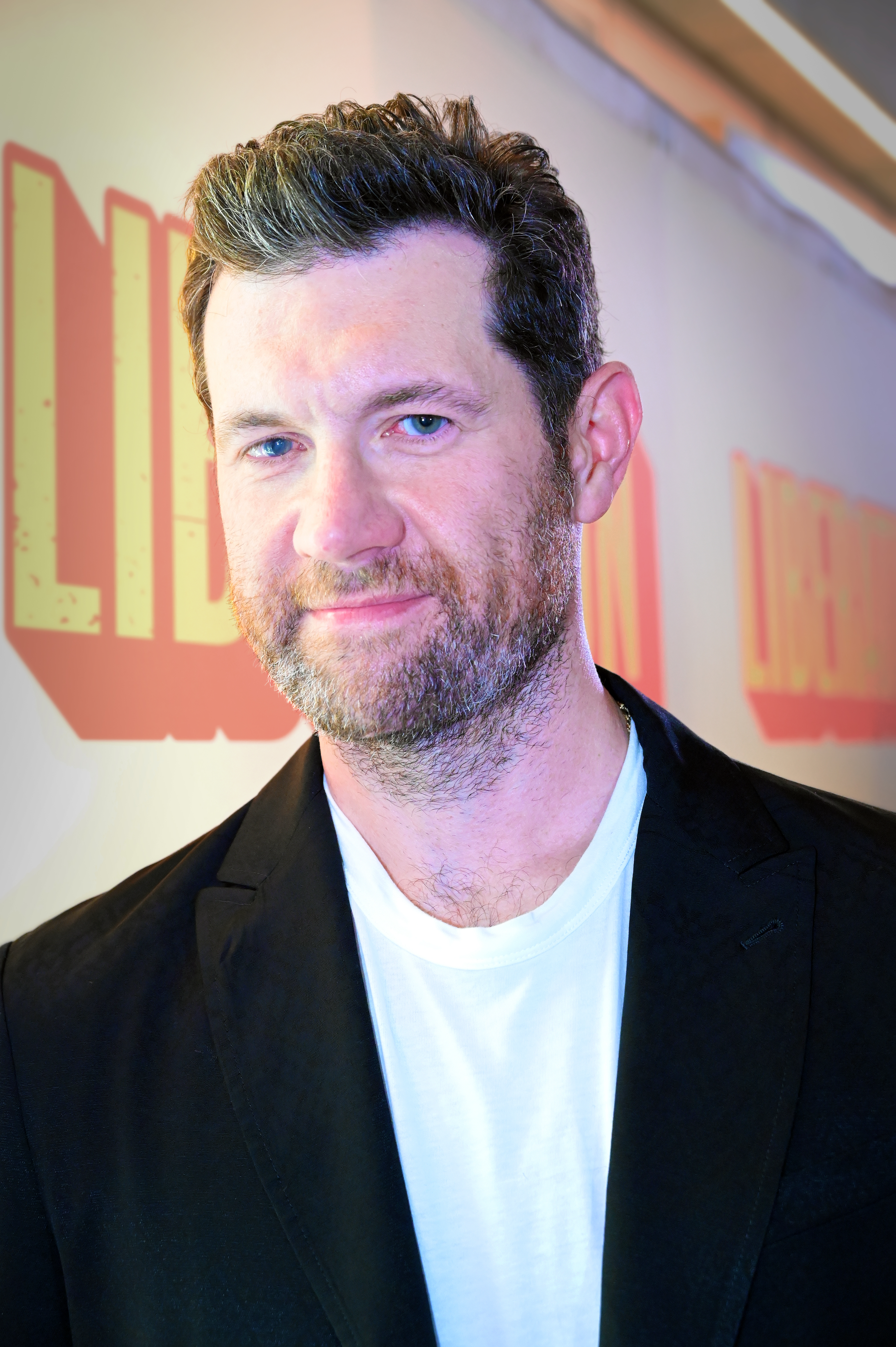
Billy Eichner

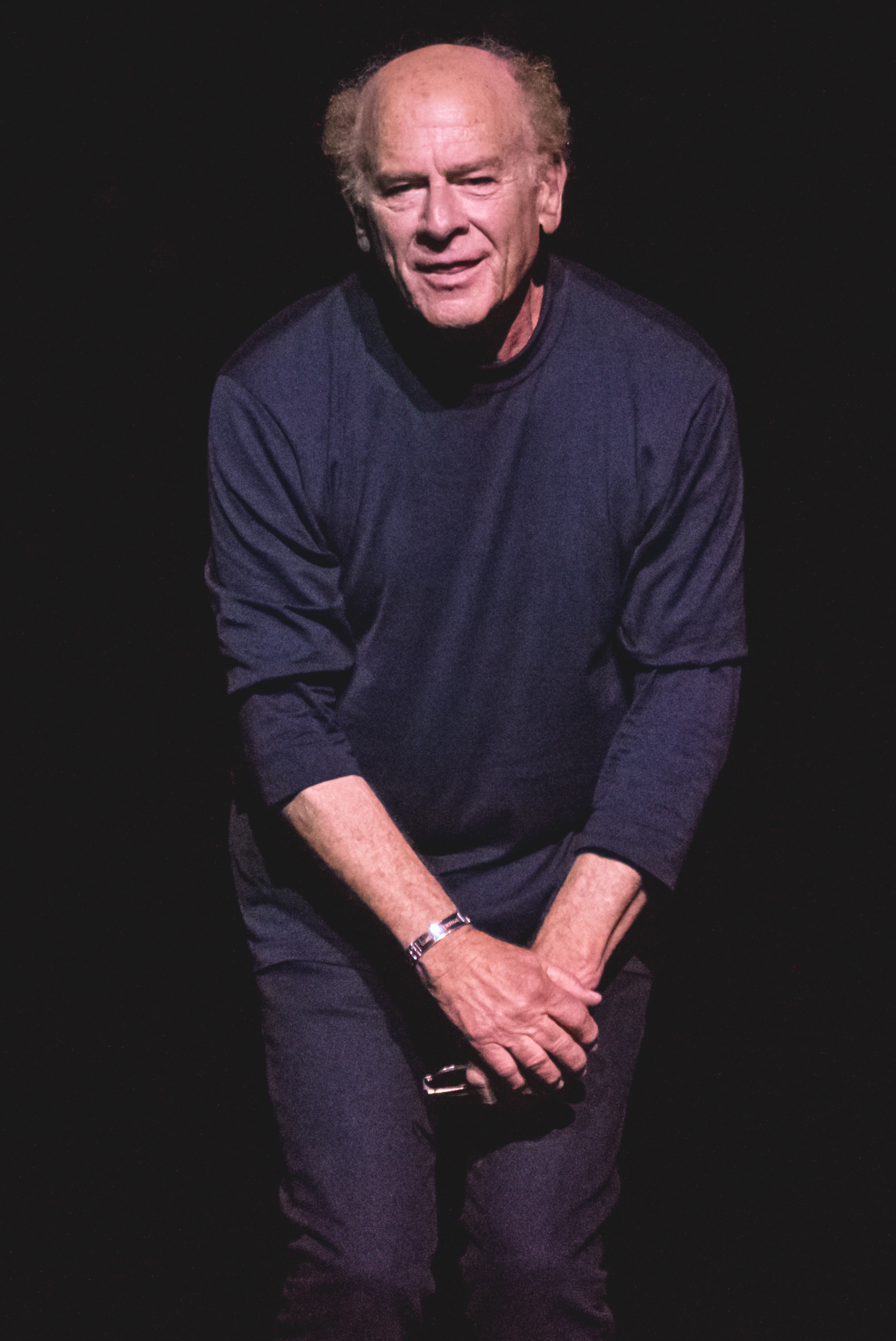
Art Garfunkel

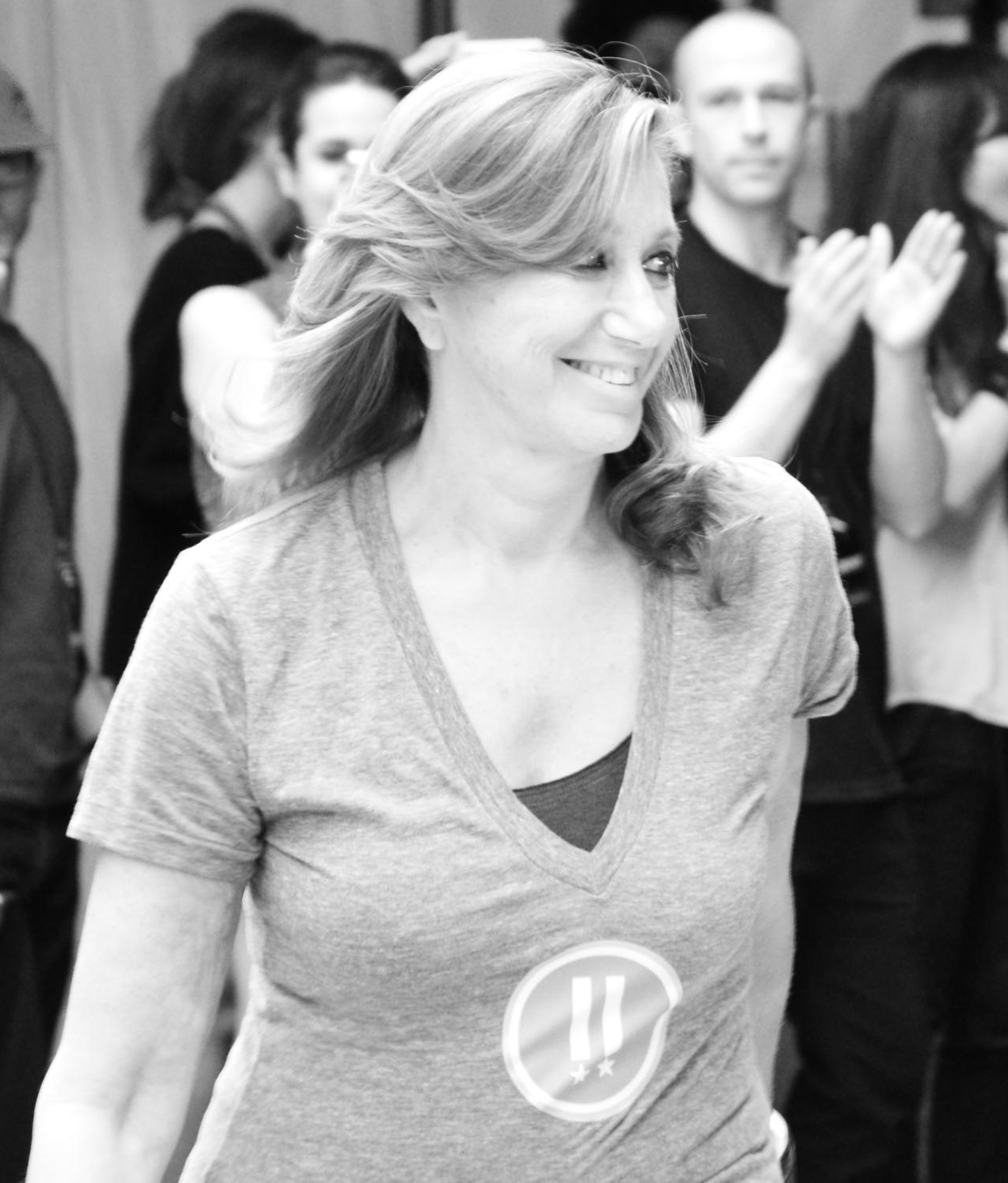
Donna Karan

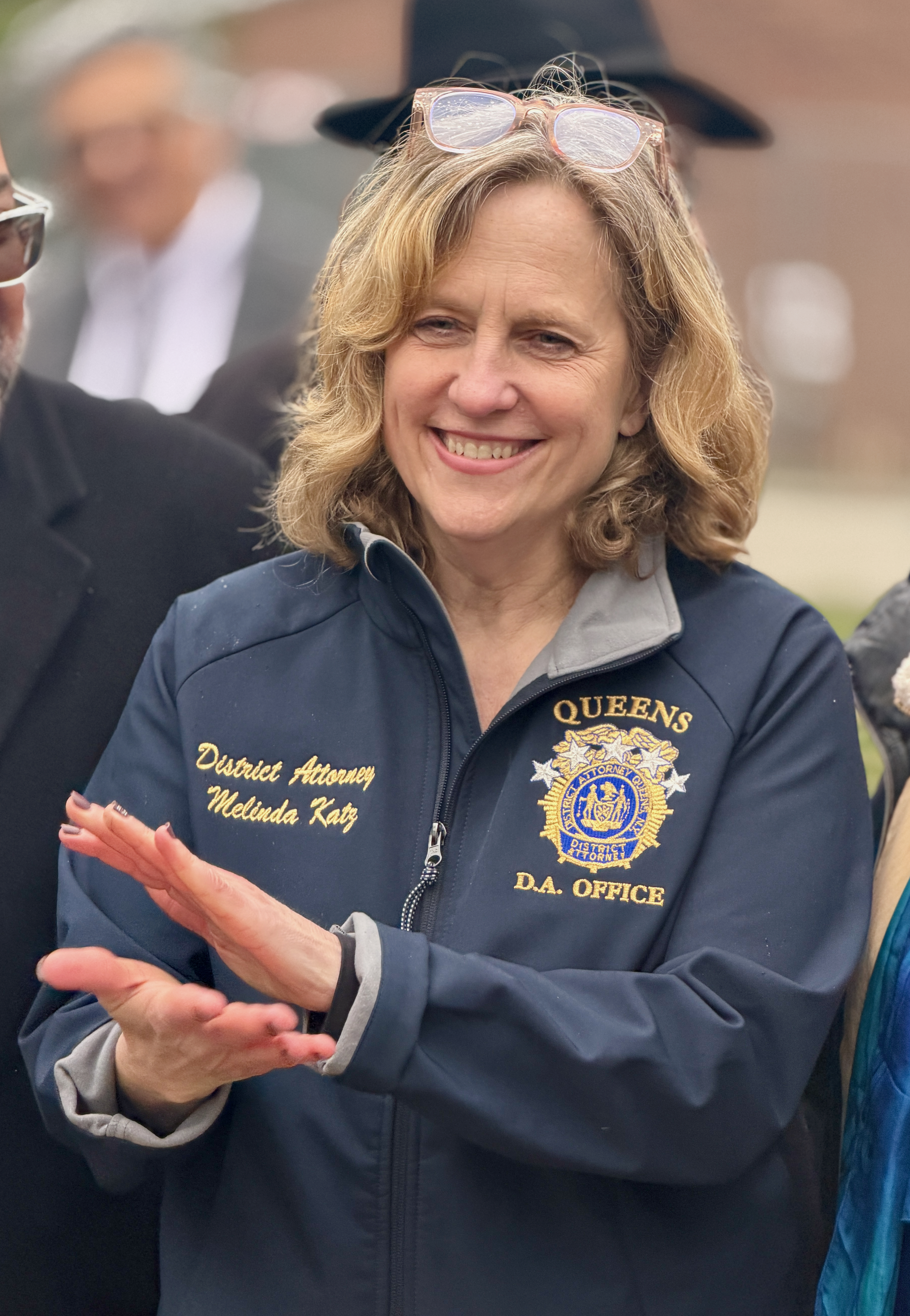
Melinda Katz

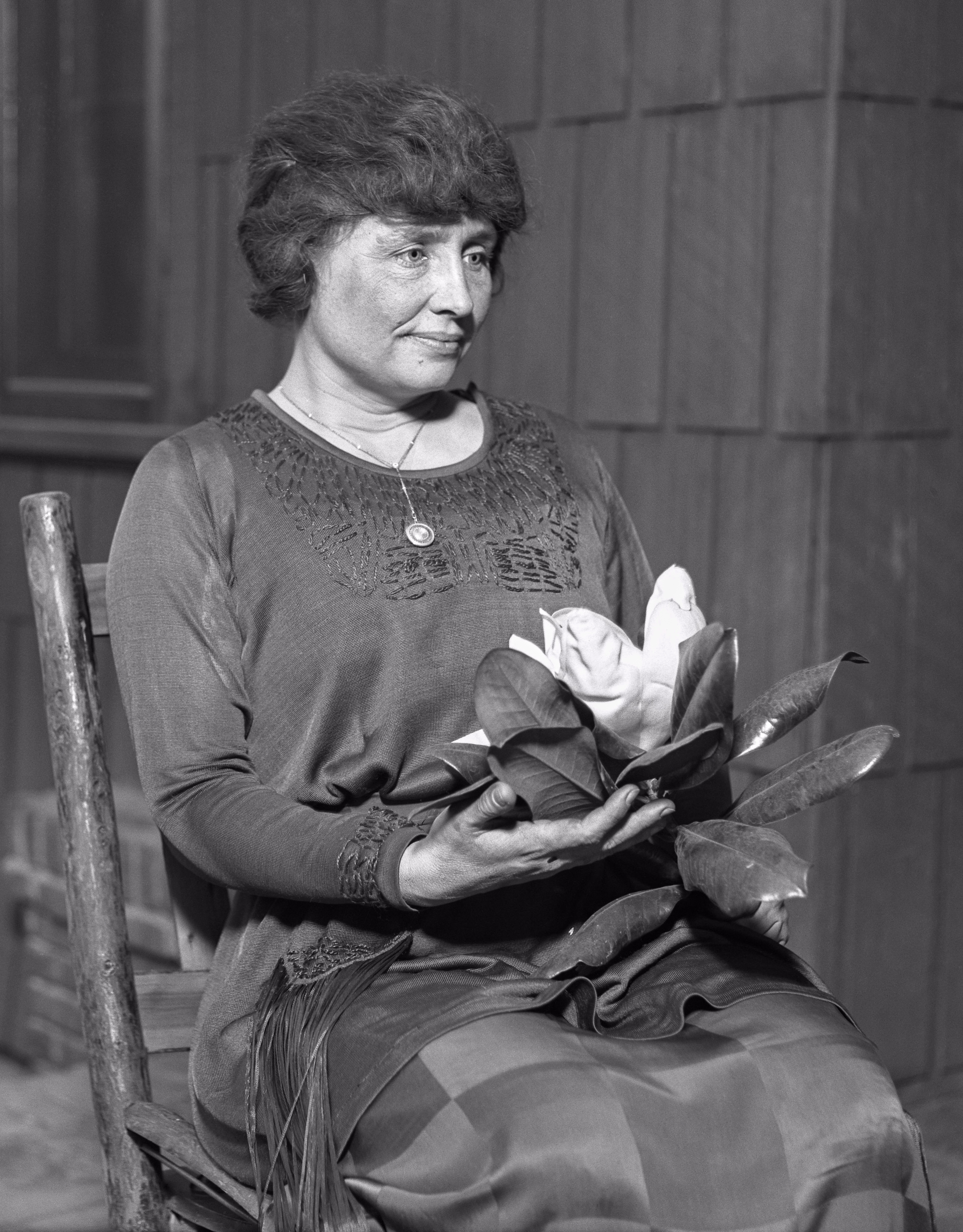
Helen Keller

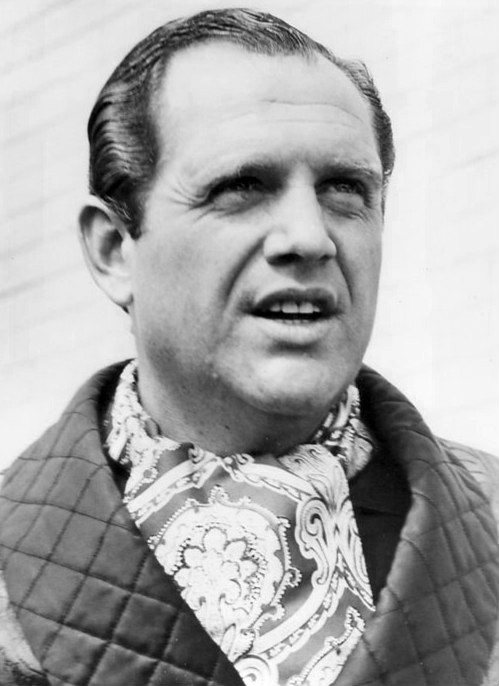
Alan King

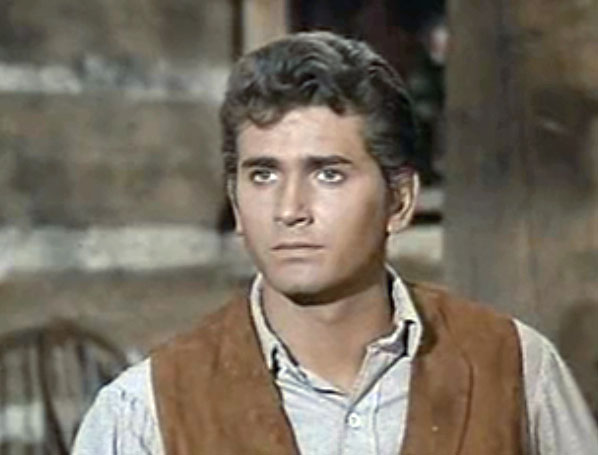
Michael Landon

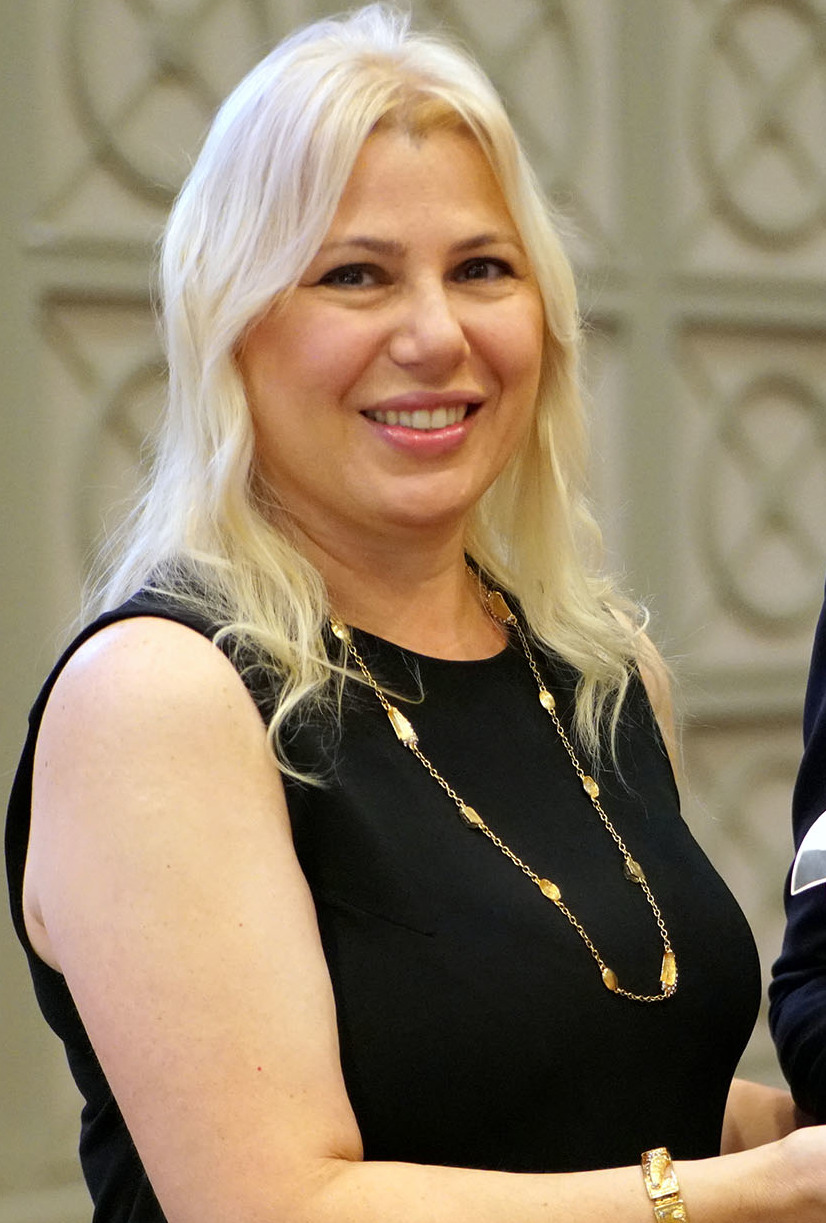
Susan Polgar

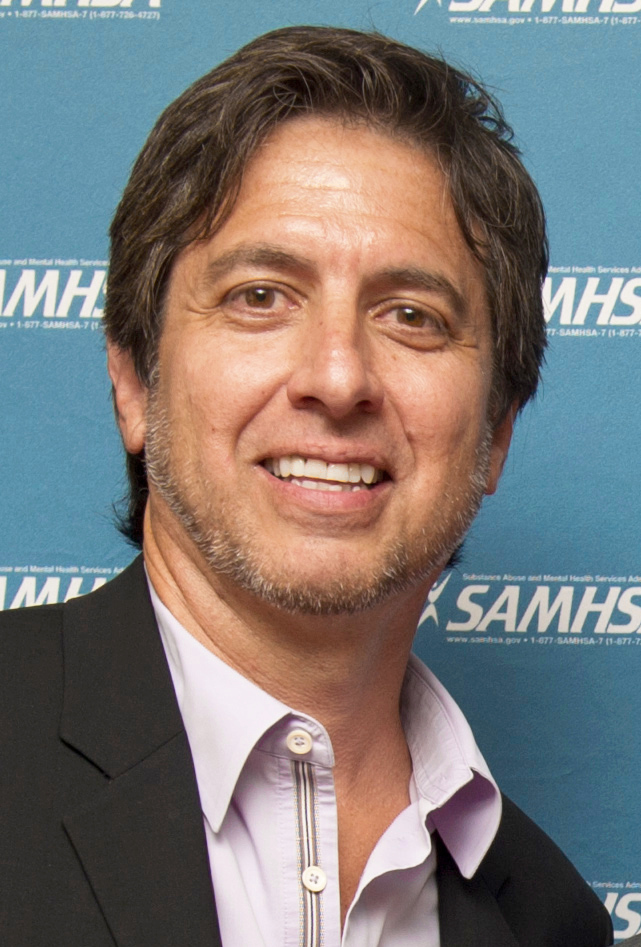
Ray Romano

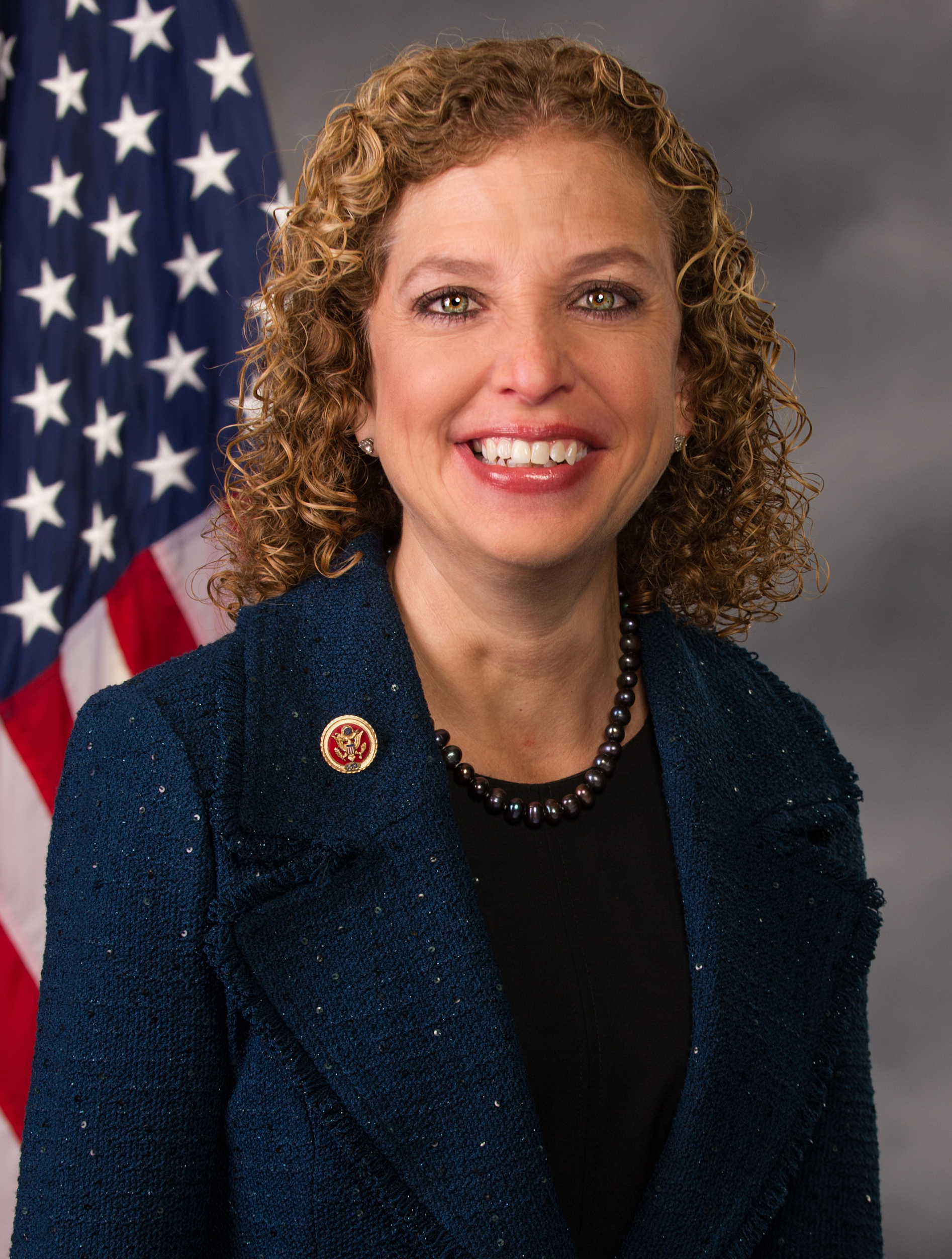
Debbie Wasserman Schultz

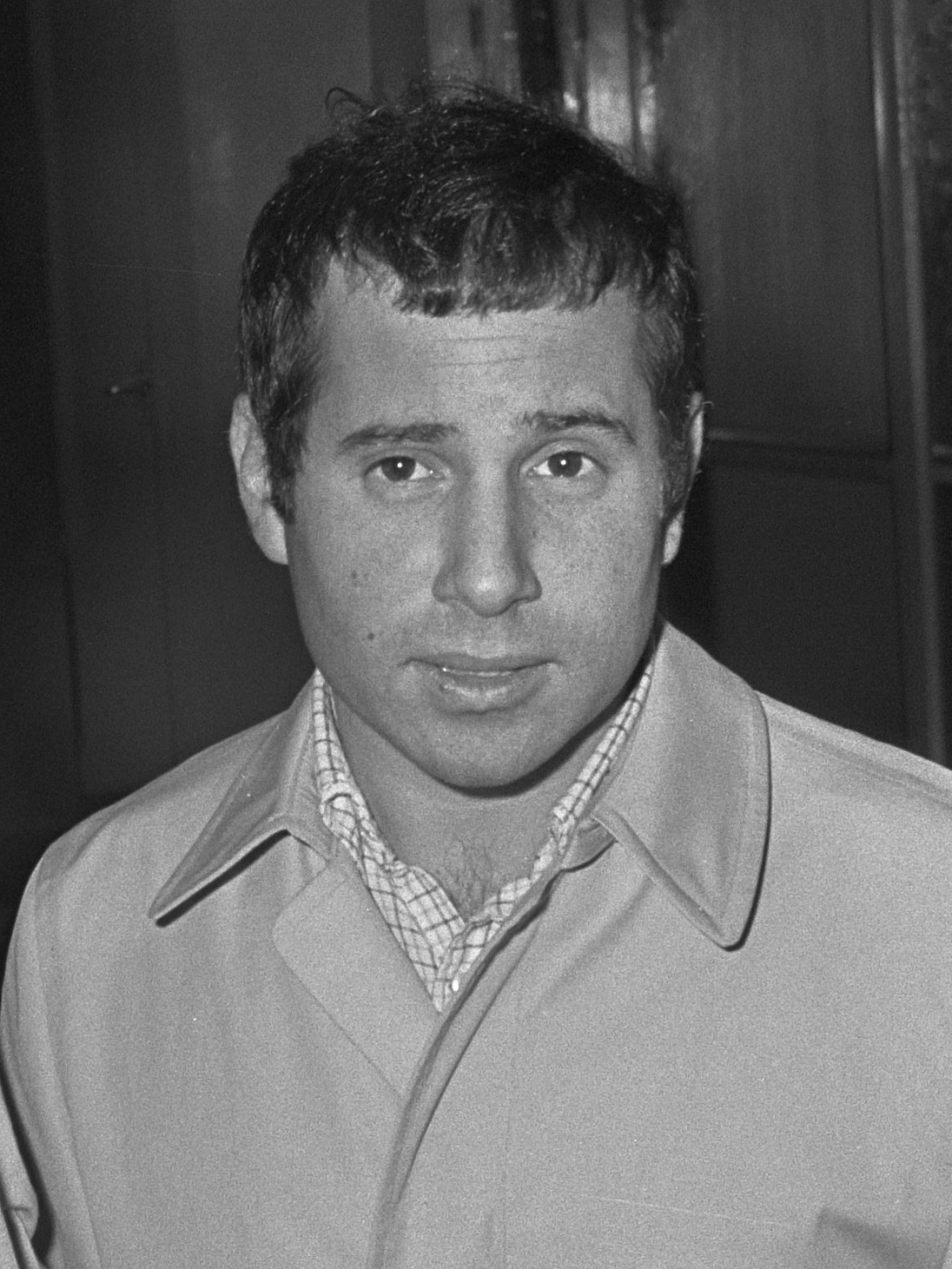
Paul Simon

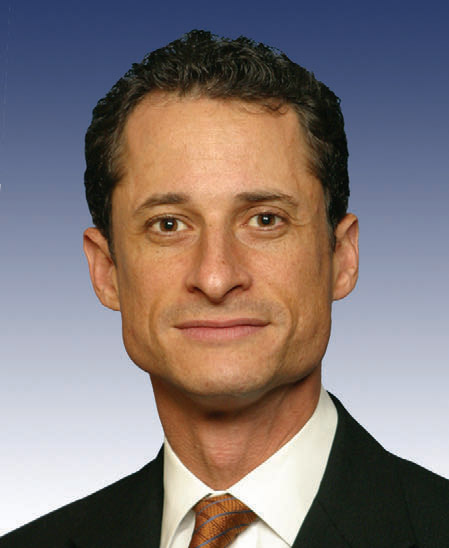
Anthony Weiner

- Jacob Arabo (born 1965), jewelry and watch designer who founded Jacob & Co
- Hank Azaria (born 1964), actor and voice artist
- Burt Bacharach (1928–2023), composer, songwriter, record producer, and pianist
- David Baltimore (1938-2025), Nobel Prize-winning virologist and professor
- Remy Banks, rapper
- Walter Becker (1950-2017), musician, songwriter, and record producer; half of the musical duo Steely Dan
- Joseph Bowler (1928–2016), artist and illustrator
- Jimmy Breslin (1929-2017), journalist and author
- Daniel Bukantz (1917–2008), Olympic fencer
- Michael A. Burstein (born 1970), science fiction writer
- Dale Carnegie (1888–1955), self-improvement lecturer and author of How to Win Friends and Influence People lived at 27 Wendover Rd in Forest Hills.
- David Caruso (born 1956), producer and actor in CSI: Miami, and NYPD Blue
- Abe Coleman (1905–2007), Polish professional wrestler, promoter, and referee
- Jeff Conaway (1950 –2011), actor
- Candy Darling (1944–1974), Warhol superstar who appeared in a number of his films
- John R. Dilworth (born 1963), animator, actor, writer, director, storyboard artist, producer, and creator of Cartoon Network's Courage the Cowardly Dog
- Dixon Donnelley (1915–1982), United States Assistant Secretary of State for Public Affairs
- Sergei Dovlatov (1941–1990), Russian short–story writer and novelist; in 2014, the corner of 63rd Drive and 108th Street was given an honorary designation in his name
- Stephen Dunn (1939 –2021), poet and educator, won the Pulitzer Prize for Poetry
- Walter Egan (born 1948), singer-songwriter ("Magnet and Steel")
- Billy Eichner (born 1978), comedian, actor, and host of Billy on the Street
- Geraldine Ferraro (1935–2011), member of U.S. House of Representatives, television personality
- Art Garfunkel (born 1941), singer-songwriter, actor, and poet
- Morton Gould (1913–1996) composer, conductor, arranger, and pianist
- Ernie Grunfeld (born 1955), former player and general manager of the Washington Wizards
- Alan Hevesi (1940–2023), disgraced former Comptroller of New York
- Steve Hofstetter (born 1979), comedian/radio personality
- John V. Hogan (1890–1960), radio pioneer
- David Horowitz (1939–2025), writer and activist
- John Francis Hylan (1848–1936), Mayor of New York City (1918–1925)
- Ethel D. Jacobs (1910–2001), thoroughbred horse owner and breeder, wife of Hirsch Jacobs
- Hirsch Jacobs (1904–1970), thoroughbred jockey, husband of Ethel D. Jacobs
- Donna Karan (born 1948), fashion designer
- Melinda Katz (born 1965), Queens County District Attorney, 19th Borough President of Queens, Member of the New York City Council, and Member of the New York State Assembly
- Helen Keller (1880–1968), lecturer, author, fundraiser, activist
- Charles Kelman (1930–2004) , ophthalmologist, surgeon, inventor, jazz musician, entertainer, and Broadway producer
- Alan King (1927–2004), actor/comedian
- Andrea King (1919–2003), stage, film, and television actress
- Israel Knox (1904–1986), author, philosophy professor
- David Krumholtz (born 1978), actor
- Gary Kurfirst (1947–2009), concert promoter, producer, manager, publisher, and record label executive
- Michael Landon (1936–1991), filmmaker, actor known for his roles on Bonanza and Little House on the Prairie
- Eddie Layton (1925–2004), stadium organist who played at old Yankee Stadium for nearly 40 years
- George Leggett, local neo-Nazi leader
- Harvey J. Levin (1924–1992), internationally recognized pioneer of communications economics, holder of Long Island's first professorial chair
- Jack Lew (born 1955), United States Secretary of the Treasury from 2013 to 2017, 25th White House chief of staff , US Ambassador to Israel, 32nd and 38th Director of the Office of Management and Budget
- Trygve Lie (1896–1968), Norwegian politician, labor leader, government official and author, first Secretary-General of the United Nations, serving from 1946 to 1952, served as Norwegian foreign minister
- Carol Lynley (1942–2019), actress best known for her role in The Poseidon Adventure
- Jack McAuliffe (nicknamed "The Napoleon of the Ring," 1866–1937), world lightweight boxing champion
- Nancy McKeon (born 1966), actress best known for her role as Jo Polniaczek on the sitcom, The Facts of Life
- Chieli Minucci (born 1958), jazz musician
- Michele "Big Mike" Miranda (1896–1973), consigliere of the Genovese crime family and one of the most powerful New York gangsters in the 1950s and 1960s
- Lore Noto (1923–2002), Off-Broadway producer, playwright, and actor
- Carroll O'Connor (1924–2001), actor, best known for his role as Archie Bunker on All in the Family
- Marco Oppedisano (born 1971), composer and guitarist
- Rick Overton (born 1954), actor and comedian
- Susan Polgar (born 1969), chess grandmaster, Women's World Chess Champion from 1996 to 1999
- The Ramones, seminal punk rock band:
  - Dee Dee Ramone (1951–2002), bassist and songwriter of the Ramones
  - Joey Ramone (1951–2001), lead singer and songwriter of the Ramones
  - Johnny Ramone (1948–2004), guitarist of the Ramones
  - Tommy Ramone (1952–2014), drummer and record producer of the Ramones
- Wilhelm Reich (1897–1957), psychiatrist known for his theories of Orgone energy
- Renée Richards (born 1934), tennis player
- Branch Rickey (1881–1965), Major League Baseball player, manager, general manager
- Thelma Ritter (1902–1969), actress
- Ray Romano (born 1957), actor-comedian, best known for Everybody Loves Raymond
- Dave Rubinstein (1964–1993), punk rock musician
- Chris Rush (1946–2018), stand-up comedian
- Renato Russo (1960–1996), Brazilian bandleader* Todd Strauss-Schulson (born 1980), film director, screenwriter, producer, editor, and cinematographer
- Joan Shawlee (née Fulton; 1926–1987), actress
- Debbie Wasserman Schultz (born 1966), member of the U.S. House of Representatives for Florida's 20th congressional district
- Michael Simanowitz (1971–2017), member of the New York State Assembly
- Paul Simon (born 1941), singer-songwriter; has twice been inducted into the Rock and Roll Hall of Fame, and has won 16 Grammy Awards
- Charley Steiner (born 1949), sportscaster and broadcast journalist
- Fred Stone (1873–1959), actor
- Tatiana Troyanos (1938–1993), mezzo-soprano known for her work at the Metropolitan Opera
- Bob Tufts (1955-2019), Major League Baseball pitcher
- Marvin Vincent (1834–1922), Presbyterian minister
- Jeff Wayne (born 1943), American-British musician,composer, and lyricist , known for his musical version of The War of the Worlds
- Katharine Weber (born 1955), novelist, author of five novels, including Triangle and True Confections
- Anthony Weiner (born 1964), politician
- Adolph Alexander Weinman (1870–1952), German-born American sculptor
- Leslie West (1945–2020), of the hard rock band Mountain
- Henry Willson (1911–1978), Hollywood agent
- Jack Wyatt (1917–2008), host of ABC's Confession; Episcopalian priest
- Min Xiao-Fen (born 1961), Chinese-American pipa player and vocalist
- Gideon Yago (born 1978), journalist, former correspondent at MTV and CBS News
- Manuel Ycaza (1938–2018), jockey inducted into the National Museum of Racing and Hall of Fame
- Pia Zadora (born 1954), actress and singer
