= St. Luke's Episcopal Church (Queens) =

- Saint Luke's Episcopal Church
- U.S. National Register of Historic Places
- New York State Register of Historic Places
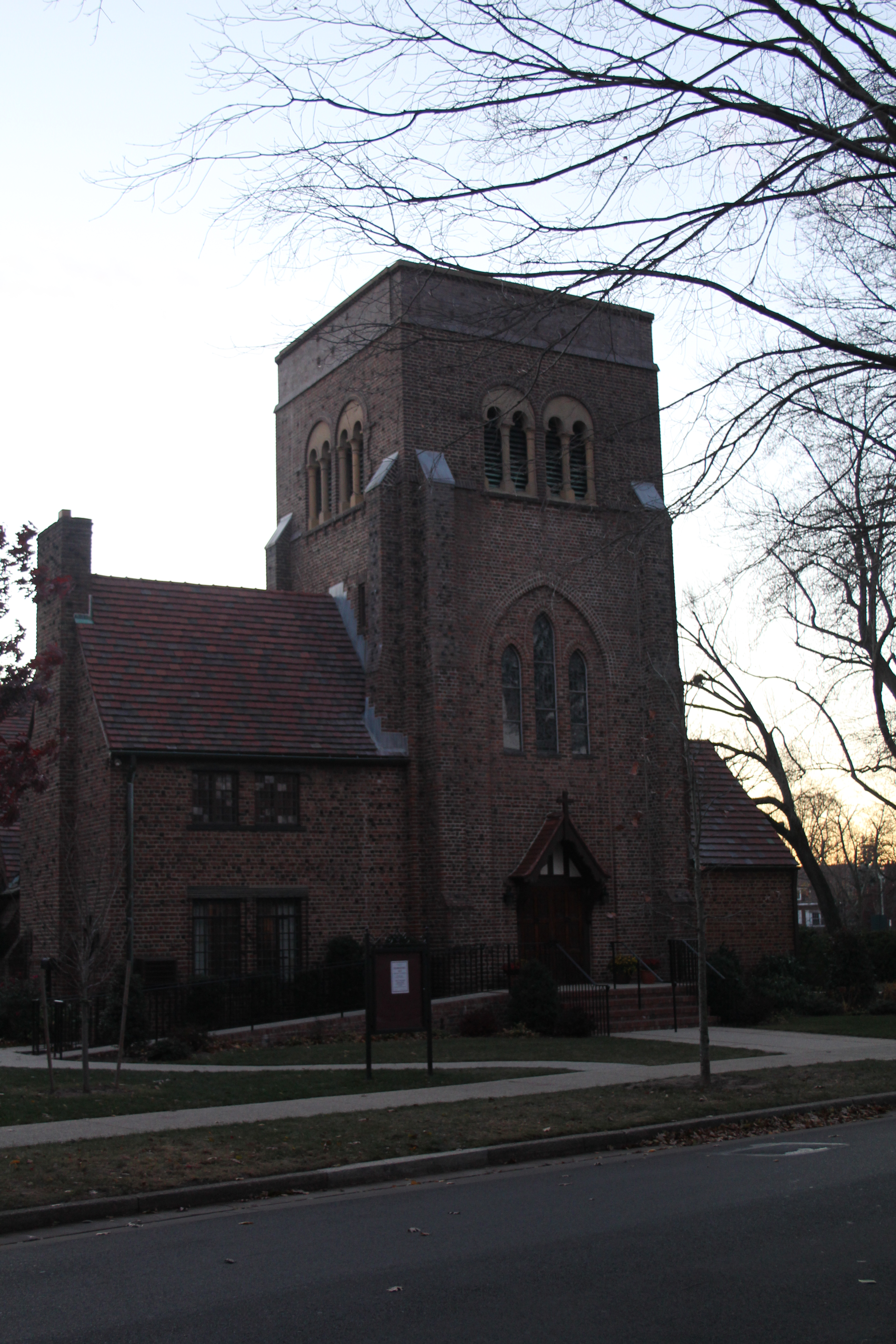
- Church building from Greenway South.

- Location within New York City Location within New York Location within the United States
- Location: 85 Greenway South, Forest Hills, NY 11375, USA
- Coordinates: 40°42′50.56″N 73°50′40.92″W
- Area: about one half acre
- Built: 1925
- Architect: Tappan, Robert
- Architectural style: Collegiate Gothic with Arts and Crafts influences
- NRHP reference No.: 10000900
- NYSRHP No.: 08101.011402

Significant dates
- Added to NRHP: November 10, 2010
- Designated NYSRHP: September 24, 2010

St. Luke's Episcopal Church is an historic Episcopal church in Forest Hills, Queens, a neighborhood of New York City. It was built in three phases that were completed in 1925, 1929, and 1940. The architect was Robert Tappan. The style, described as Collegiate Gothic with Arts and Crafts influences, was chosen to harmonize with surrounding houses in the upscale Forest Hills Gardens development. Tappan was a resident of Forest Hills Gardens and a member of the church, and took no fees for his work. In 1950 a parish house was added, designed by architect Steward Wagner, who was also a resident of the Gardens and a member of the nearby The Church-in-the-Gardens.

The church was listed on the National Register of Historic Places in 2010.
