= Tuskegee Airmen National Historic Site =

Museum in Tuskegee, Alabama, USA

- Tuskegee Airmen National Historic Site; Tuskegee Institute Field #2; Moton Field
- U.S. National Register of Historic Places
- U.S. National Historic Landmark District
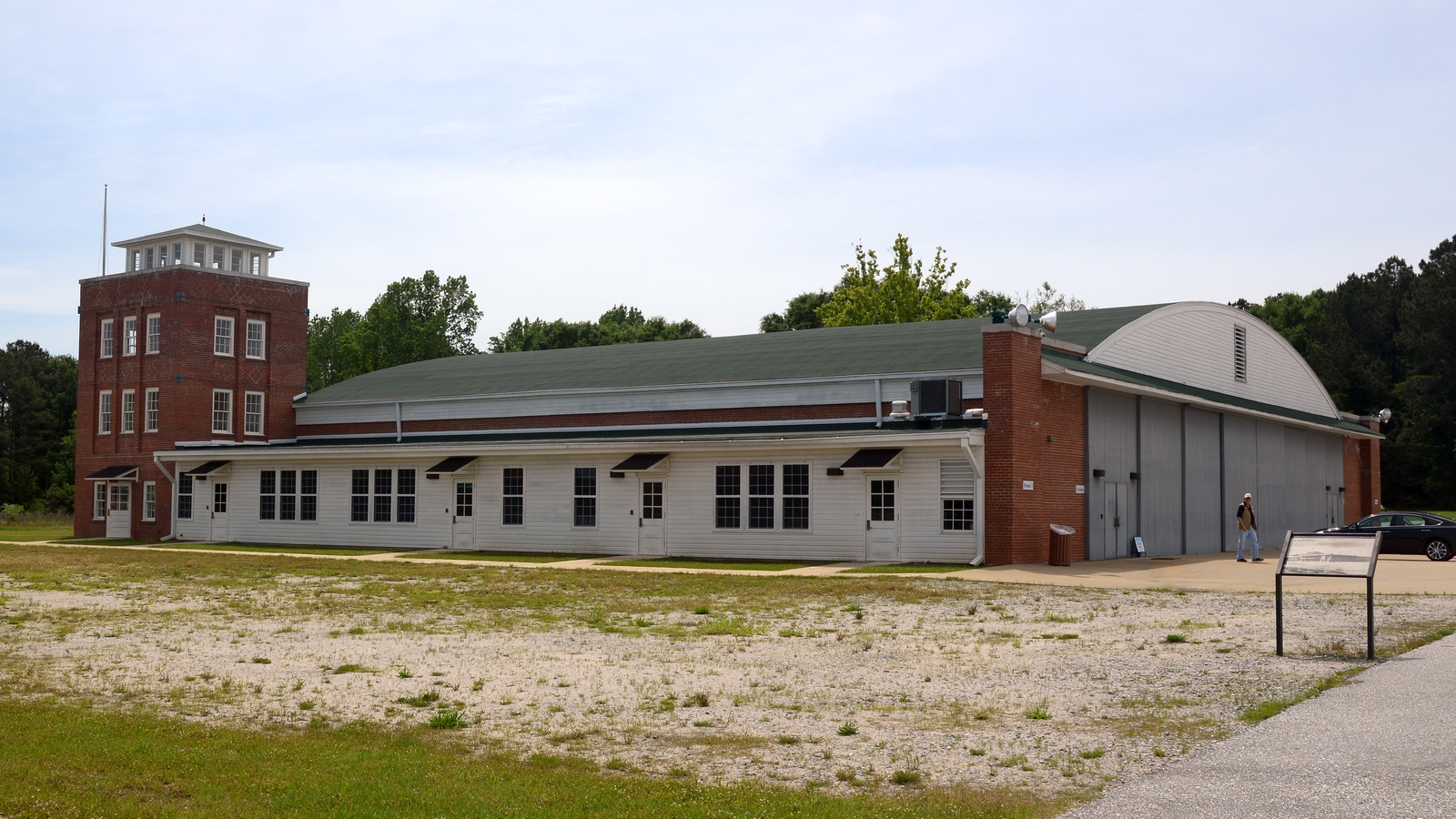
- Hangar 2 and the control tower at Moton Field

- Location within Alabama Location within the United States
- Location: Tuskegee, Alabama, United States
- Coordinates: 32°27′33″N 85°40′48″W
- Area: 89.68 acres (0.3629 km^{2})
- Built: 1940
- Architect: U.S. Army
- Visitation: 25,041 (2025)
- Website: Tuskegee Airmen National Historic Site
- NRHP reference No.: 01000284

Significant dates
- Added to NRHP: November 6, 1998
- Designated NHLD: November 6, 1998

Tuskegee Airmen National Historic Site, at Moton Field in Tuskegee, Alabama, commemorates the contributions of African-American airmen in World War II. Moton Field was the site of primary flight training for the pioneering pilots known as the Tuskegee Airmen, and is now operated by the National Park Service to interpret their history and achievements. It was constructed in 1941 as a new training base. The field was named after former Tuskegee Institute principal Robert Russa Moton, who died the previous year.

== Overview ==
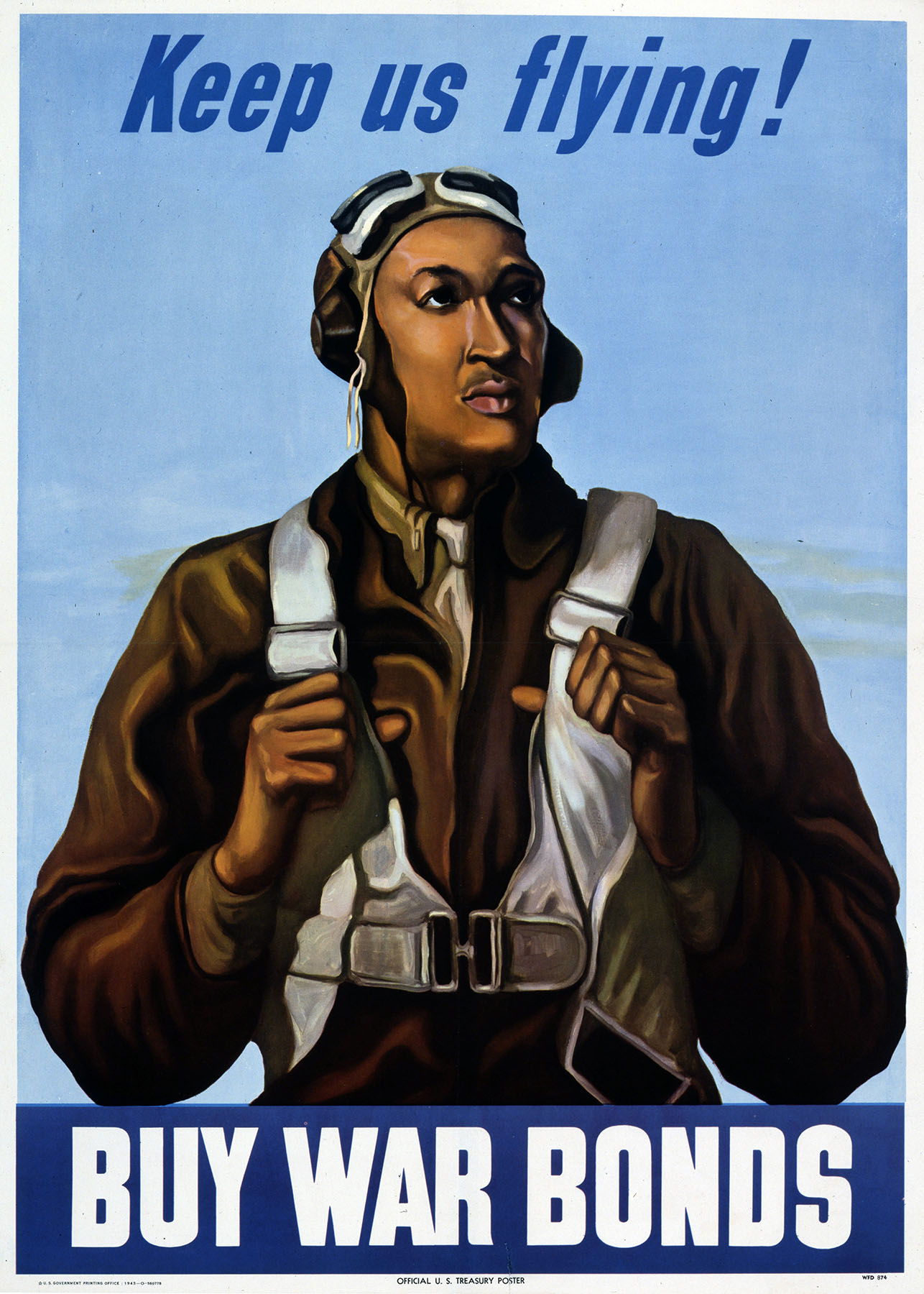
Poster of a Tuskegee Airman

Before 1940, African Americans were barred from flying for the U.S. military. Civil rights organizations and the black press exerted pressure that resulted in the formation of an all African-American pursuit squadron based in Tuskegee, Alabama, in 1941. They became known as the Tuskegee Airmen.

"Tuskegee Airmen" refers to all who were involved in the so-called "Tuskegee Experiment" (later called the "Tuskegee Experience"). This Army Air Corps and then Army Air Force program trained African-Americans to fly and maintain both training and combat aircraft. The Tuskegee Airmen included pilots, navigators, bombardiers, maintenance and support staff, instructors, and all the personnel who kept the planes in the air (approximately 16,000)

The military selected Tuskegee Institute to train pilots because of its commitment to aeronautical training. Tuskegee had the facilities, and engineering and technical instructors, as well as a climate for year-round flying. The first Civilian Pilot Training Program students completed their instruction in May 1940. The Tuskegee program was then expanded and became the center for African-American aviation during World War II.

The Tuskegee Airmen overcame segregation and prejudice to become one of the most highly respected fighter groups of World War II. They proved conclusively that African Americans could fly and maintain sophisticated combat aircraft. The Tuskegee Airmen's achievements, together with the men and women who supported them, paved the way for full integration of the U.S. military.

== History ==
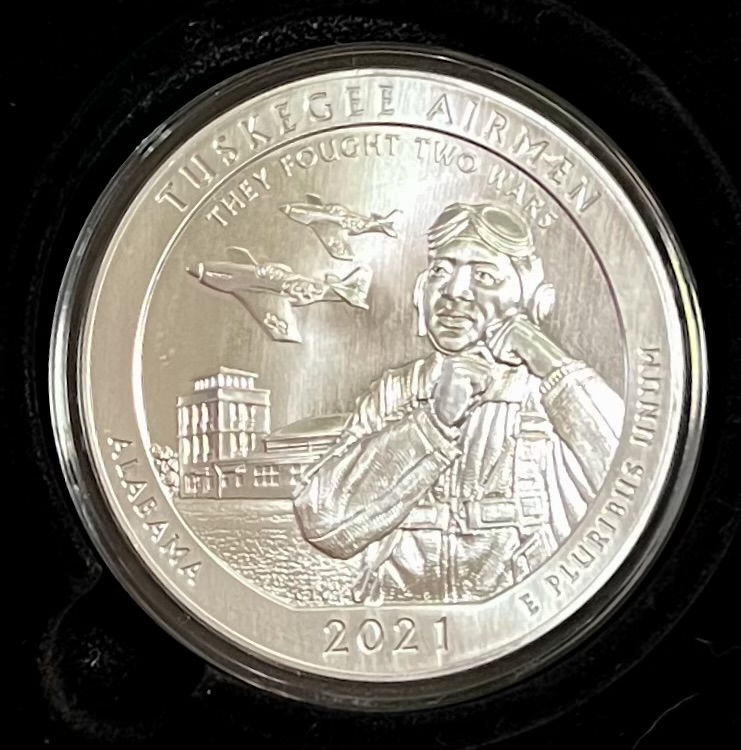
2021 US Mint five-ounce silver coin depicting the Tuskegee Airmen National Historic Site, the image also used on the reverse of that year's America the Beautiful quarter

Moton Field was the only primary flight facility for African-American pilot candidates in the U.S. Army Air Corps (Army Air Forces) during World War II. It was named for Robert Russa Moton, second president of Tuskegee Institute.

Moton Field was built between 1940 and 1942 with funding from the Julius Rosenwald Fund to provide primary flight training under a contract with the U.S. military. Staff from Maxwell Field, Montgomery, Alabama, provided assistance in selecting and mapping the site. Architect Edward C. Miller and engineer G. L. Washington designed many of the structures. Archie A. Alexander, an engineer and contractor, oversaw construction of the flight school facilities. Tuskegee Institute laborers and skilled workers helped finish the field so that flight training could start on time.

The Army Air Corps and later the Army Air Force assigned officers to oversee the training at Tuskegee Institute/Moton Field. They furnished cadets with textbooks, flying clothes, parachutes, and mechanic suits. Tuskegee Institute, the civilian contractor, provided facilities for the aircraft and personnel, including quarters and a mess for the cadets, hangars and maintenance shops, and offices for Army Air Corps/Army Air Force personnel, flight instructors, ground school instructors, and mechanics. Tuskegee Institute was one of the very few American institutions to own, develop, and control facilities for military flight instruction. In addition to the primary flight training at Moton Field, the following known sub-bases, auxiliaries, and an intermediate/advanced site were used:

- Calabee Flight Strip 32°21′50″N 085°45′50″W
- Hardaway Auxiliary Field (location undetermined)
- Kennedy Auxiliary Field (Tuskegee Institute Field #1) 32°21′05″N 085°39′23″W
- Tuskegee Army Air Field (U. S. Army Air Force)

In late March 1941 Eleanor Roosevelt, wife of President Franklin D. Roosevelt, visited Kennedy Field in the Tuskegee area and was taken up in an aircraft piloted by C. Alfred "Chief" Anderson, Tuskegee Institute's chief instructor pilot. As a result of the flight, stories appeared in newspapers across the nation. The positive stories helped Mrs. Roosevelt, a Rosenwald Fund trustee, in conjunction with Tuskegee Institute, secure financing for the final construction of Moton Field.

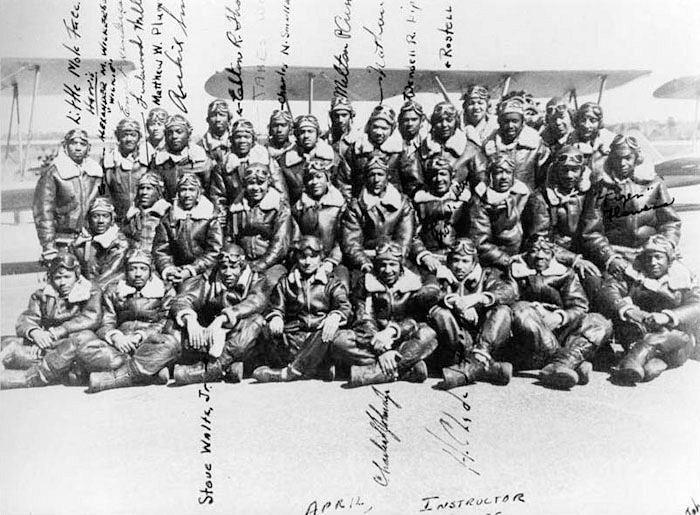
Moton Field flight instructors in front of PT-13 Stearmans, 1945

The first class (42-C), which included student officer Captain Benjamin O. Davis, Jr., began training on July 19, 1941. who served as Commandant of Cadets. Twelve cadets served with him under Captain Noel F. Parrish, a white officer, and 2nd Lieutenant Harold C. Magoon, another white officer, who served as the adjutant. The other cadets were John C. Anderson, Jr., Charles D. Brown, Theodore E. Brown, Marion A. Carter, Lemuel R. Custis, Charles H. DeBow, Jr., Frederick H. Moore, Ulysses S. Pannell, George S. Roberts, Mac Ross, William H. Slade, and Roderick C. Williams. Only five of these cadets completed the advanced flying training at Tuskegee Army Air Field (about five miles from Moton Field), in March 1942.

Rigorous training in subjects such as meteorology, navigation, and instruments was provided in ground school. After pilot cadets passed primary flight training at Moton Field, they transferred to Tuskegee Army Air Field (TAAF) to complete their training with the Army Air Forces. TAAF was a full-scale military base (albeit segregated) built by the U.S. military. The facility at Moton Field included two aircraft hangars, a control tower, locker building, clubhouse, wooden offices and storage buildings, brick storage buildings, and a vehicle maintenance area.

Many cadets got their primary flight instruction at Moton Field. Support personnel were trained at Chanute Field in Illinois. Between 1941 and 1945, Tuskegee Institute trained over 1,000 black aviators for the war effort.

Moton Field was closed in 1946. In 1972, a large portion of the air field at Moton Field was deeded to the city of Tuskegee for use as a municipal airport which is still in use today.

== National Historic Site ==
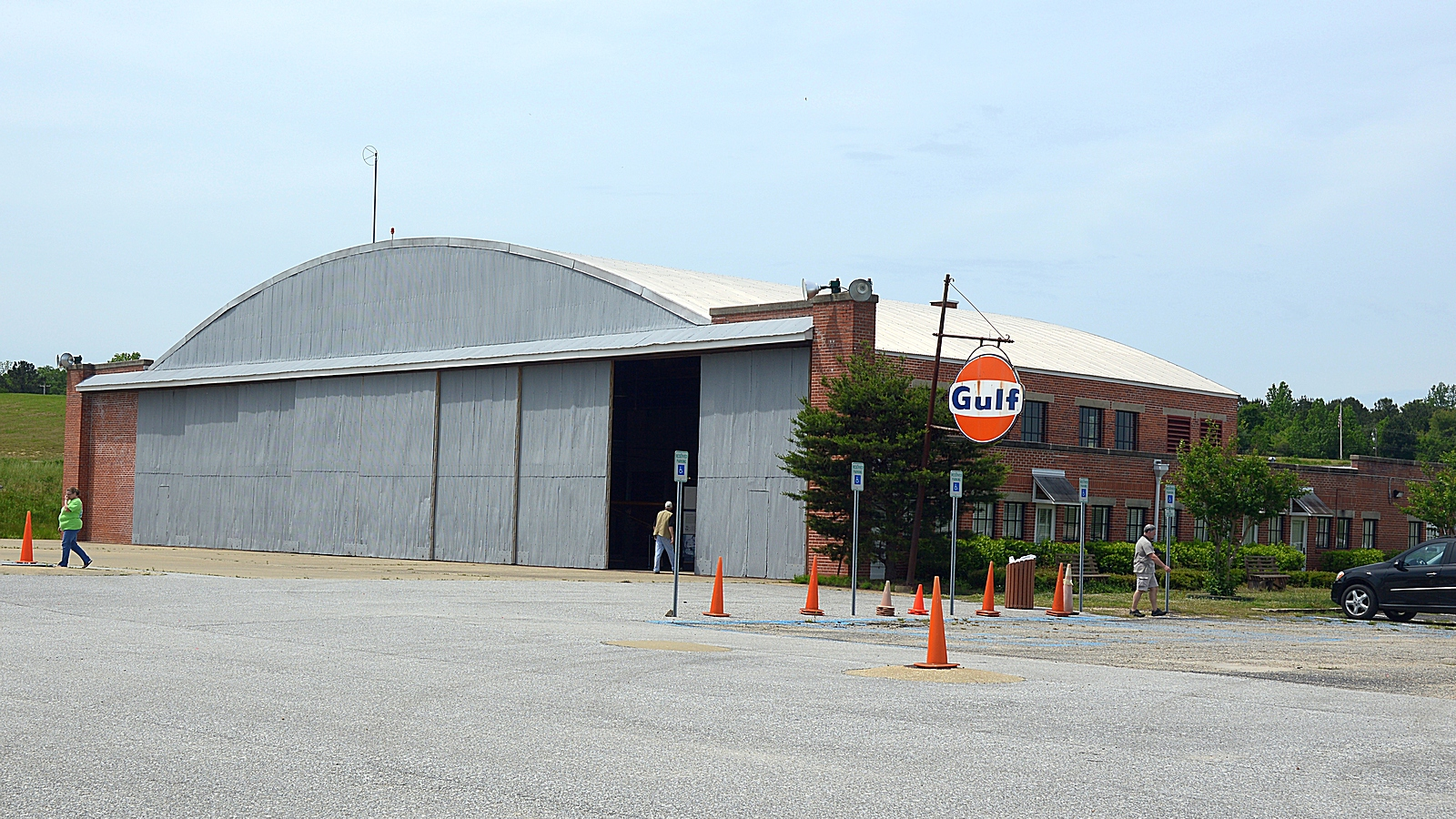
Hangar 1 at Moton Field in 2015

Established on November 6, 1998, the National Historic Site was placed on the National Register of Historic Places the same day. Hangar 1 was restored and the grand opening of the site was October 10, 2008. The museum is open Monday–Saturday. Entrance is free of charge to the public.

An oral history project, consisting of interviews of hundreds of people involved in the Tuskegee Experience, was completed in 2005 and will eventually be available to the public.

In January 2021, the Tuskegee Airmen National Historical Site was depicted on the 56th and final quarter in the America the Beautiful Quarters series.

On the reverse side of the quarter is a Tuskegee Airman suiting up for a fight during World War II with the Moton Field Control tower in the background and a couple of P-51 Mustangs flying above. The quarter is inscribed with the phrase "THEY FOUGHT TWO WARS" referencing both the war against fascism abroad and efforts to combat racism at home.

== See also ==
- Alabama World War II Army Airfields
- Tuskegee Army Airfield
- 29th Flying Training Wing (World War II)
