= 332d Expeditionary Operations Group =

United States Air Force Air Combat Command unit

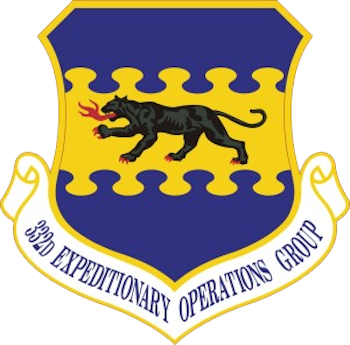
- Emblem of the 332d Expeditionary Operations Group
- Active: 1942–1945, 1947–1948, 1948–1949, 1998–2012, 2014–present
- Country: United States
- Branch: United States Air Force
- Type: Provisional Expeditionary unit
- Part of: United States Air Forces Central
- Garrison/HQ: Southwest Asia
- Engagements: World War II; European Campaign (1944–1945): Operation Southern Watch (1998–2003); Operation Enduring Freedom (2002–2003); Operation Iraqi Freedom (2003–2011); Operation Inherent Resolve (2014–present)

Commanders
- Notable commanders: Colonel Benjamin O. Davis Jr., 8 October 1943 – 3 November 1944; 24 December 1944 – 9 June 1945

The 332d Expeditionary Operations Group is a provisional air expeditionary group of the United States Air Force's Air Combat Command, currently active. It was inactivated on 8 May 2012 and reactivated 16 November 2014.

The group forms part of the lineage of the World War II 332d Fighter Group, known as the Tuskegee Airmen. This title refers to all who trained in the Army Air Forces African-American pilot training program at Moton Field and Tuskegee Army Air Field, Alabama, between 1941 and 1945. It includes pilots, navigators, bombardiers, maintenance and support staff, instructors, and personnel who kept aircraft flying.

== Permanently assigned 332d EOG squadrons ==
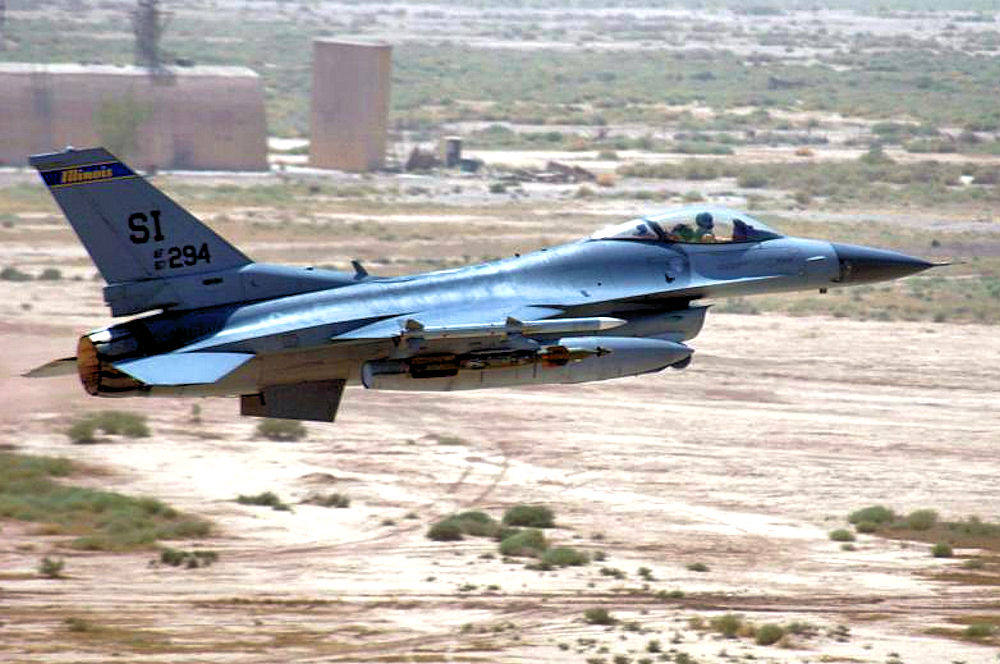
170th EFS F-16, from Springfield, Illinois, taking off from Joint Base Balad

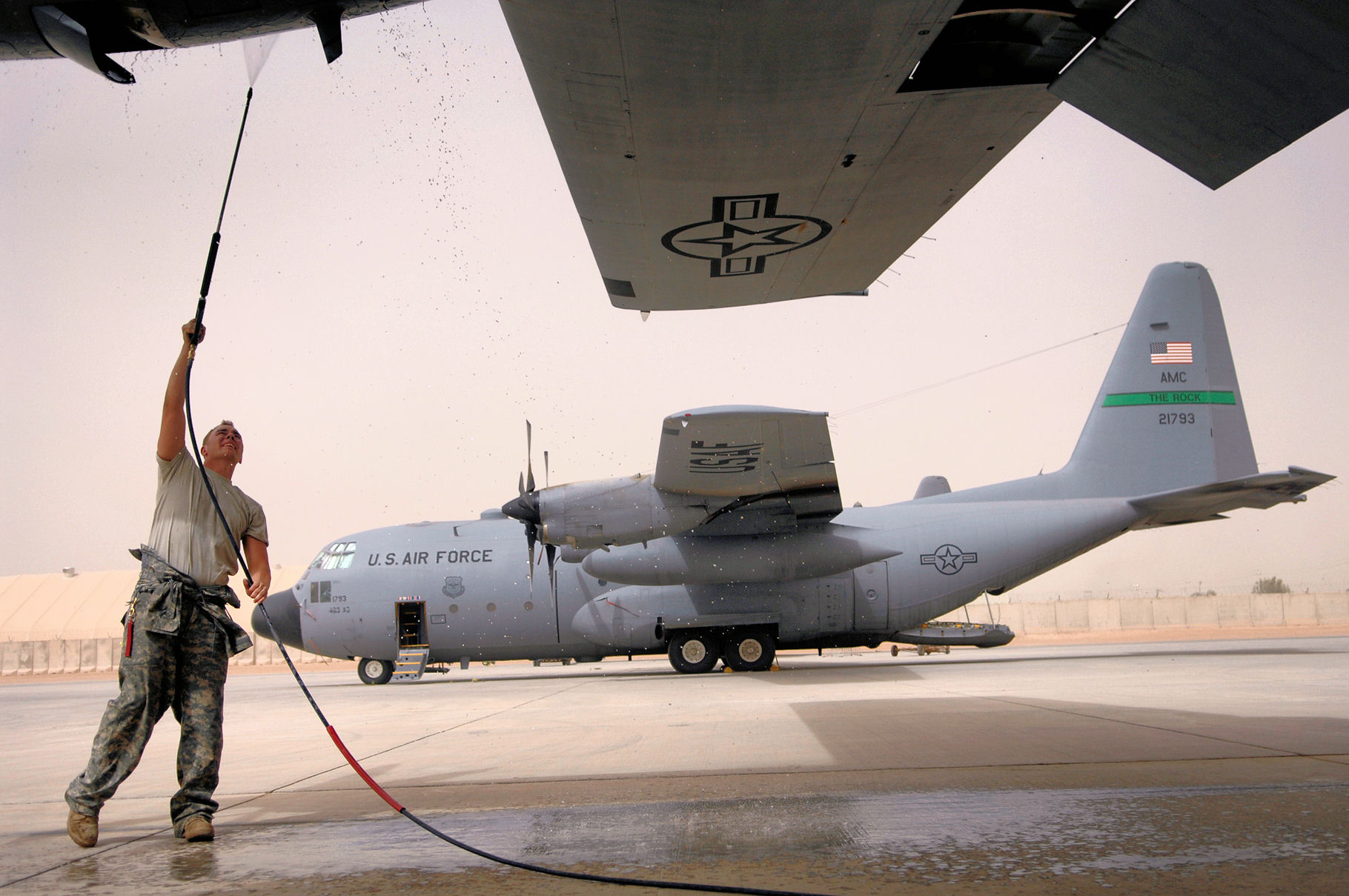
777th Expeditionary Airlift Squadron C-130 Hercules at Balad AB Iraq getting a power wash of the engines to ensure that built up dust does not get pulled into the intake during flight.

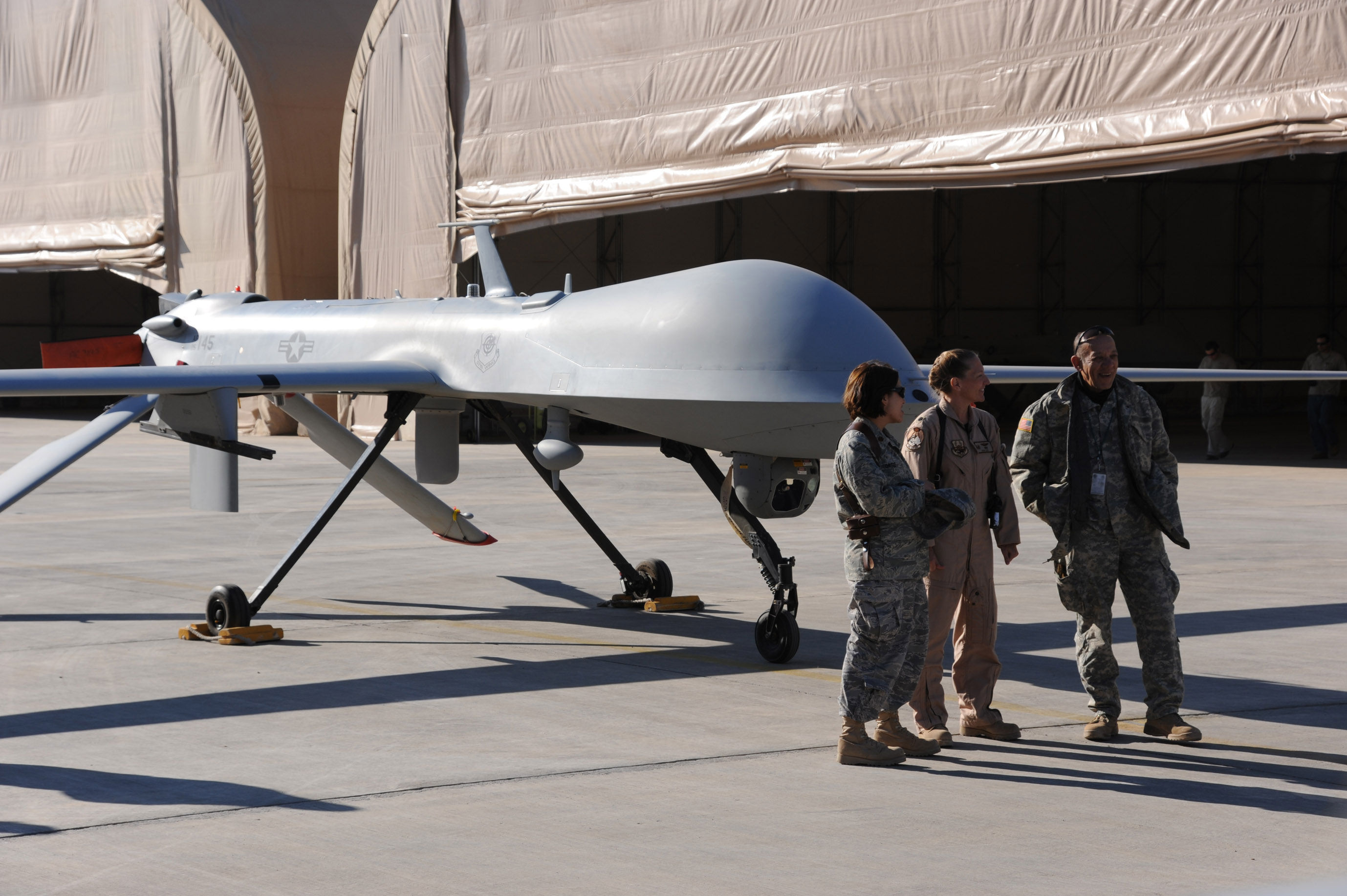
46th Expeditionary Reconnaissance Squadron MQ-1B Predator UAV

- 22d Expeditionary Fighter Squadron

Provided close-air support, offensive and defensive counter-air operations, interdiction, and suppression and destruction of enemy air defenses using F-16CM Block 50 Fighting Falcons. At the heart of "The Big 22" are more than 300 Airmen who support, maintain and fly the newest F-16s in the U.S. Air Force inventory.

- 332d Expeditionary Fighter Squadron

The 332d Expeditionary Fighter Squadron was a designation used to refer to Air National Guard and Air Force Reserve Command F-16 units deploying to Joint Base Balad. While the 332d designation was widely used, it was not the proper designation of the units while deployed to Joint Base Balad. The 332d is used since most Guard/Reserve units rotated in and out on a more frequent basis compared to their active duty counterparts.
Consisted of: 93rd Expeditionary Fighter Squadron (Air Force Reserve)
Consisted of: 107th Expeditionary Fighter Squadron (Michigan ANG)
Consisted of: 111th Expeditionary Fighter Squadron (Texas ANG)
Consisted of: 119th Expeditionary Fighter Squadron (New Jersey ANG)
Consisted of: 120th Expeditionary Fighter Squadron (Colorado ANG)
Consisted of: 121st Expeditionary Fighter Squadron (D.C. ANG)
Consisted of: 124th Expeditionary Fighter Squadron (Iowa ANG)
Consisted of: 125th Expeditionary Fighter Squadron (Oklahoma ANG)
Consisted of: 170th Expeditionary Fighter Squadron (Illinois ANG)
Consisted of: 176th Expeditionary Fighter Squadron (Wisconsin ANG)
Consisted of: 179th Expeditionary Fighter Squadron (Minnesota ANG)
Consisted of: 186th Expeditionary Fighter Squadron (Montana ANG)
Consisted of: 301st Expeditionary Fighter Squadron (Air Force Reserve)
Consisted of: 457th Expeditionary Fighter Squadron (Air Force Reserve)
Executed the daily ATO in support of Operation Iraqi Freedom by flying F-16 Block 30 Fighting Falcons which can provide real-time imagery to joint tactical air controllers embedded with ground units via the Tactical Airborne Reconnaissance System (TARS) as well as close-air support, offensive and defensive counter-air operations, and interdiction. This squadron consisted of Air National Guard or Reserve units.

- 777th Expeditionary Airlift Squadron

This was the largest forward-deployed airlift squadron in Operation Iraqi Freedom. Composed of over 100 Airmen and a fleet of C-130 Hercules aircraft, the 777 EAS has five primary missions: hub-and-spoke air-land missions, airdrop, aeromedical evacuation, distinguished visitor airlift and communications, and command and control for Joint Airborne Battle Staff support to Coalition forces on the ground. The squadron has all-weather, night-vision, and air-land delivery capability.

- 64th Expeditionary Rescue Squadron

Provided combat search and rescue support to Coalition forces in the Iraqi theater of operations. It is the largest-single CSAR operation since the end of the Vietnam War and consists of HH-60 Pave Hawk helicopters and aircrews, Guardian Angel weapons system personnel and associated support. The 64 ERQS is tasked through the Joint Personnel Recovery Center located at the CENTCOM Combined Air and Space Operations Center.

- 46th Expeditionary Reconnaissance Squadron

Was responsible for launch and recovery of the General Atomics MQ-1 Predator unmanned aerial systems in Iraq. The Predator provides intelligence, surveillance, and reconnaissance capability for 24-hour coverage of the Iraqi battlespace. The squadron also provides a line-of-sight base-defense mission for JBB.

- 332d Expeditionary Operations Support Squadron

Was responsible for supporting all 332 EOG functions across the airpower operational spectrum. The 332 EOSS "Mustangs" execute senior airfield-authority duties, including: local tower control, combined en route radar approach, and airfield management. The Mustangs also provide support through intelligence, weapons and tactics, ground liaison, joint weather forecasting, aeromedical evacuation, aircrew flight equipment, and strategic reconnaissance services.

- 362d Expeditionary Reconnaissance Squadron

Operated the MC-12W Liberty aircraft, the 362 ERS provided intelligence, surveillance, and reconnaissance in support of coalition ground forces. Its eight-person crew (four airborne and four on the ground) provides support to a broad range of users from corps to the squad level. Missions include overwatch, convoy escort and personnel recovery.

- 727th Expeditionary Air Control Squadron

Using the callsign "Kingpin", the 727 EACS was the primary tactical command and control agency for Iraq. 727 EACS provides persistent surveillance, identification, and control of aircraft over more than 270,000 square miles of Iraqi airspace. The 727 EACS ensured CFACC intent was met through precise air tasking order execution, including airspace deconfliction, air-refueling positioning and management, close-air support, tactical reconnaissance, and dynamic targeting support while balancing air operations directive priorities.

== History ==
=== World War II ===
The United States entered World War II with a military that was segregated by race and remained segregated until 1948. War Department planners generally placed White and African-American Army personnel in separate units during World War II.

The 332d Fighter Group was constituted on 4 July 1942, and activated on 13 October, predominantly manned with African-American personnel. Consisted of the 100th, 301st and 302d Fighter Squadrons at Tuskegee Army Air Field, Alabama. Trained with Bell P-39 Airacobra and Curtiss P-40 Warhawk aircraft for an extended period of time as the Army Air Forces was reluctant to deploy African-American fighter pilots to an overseas combat theater. The 100th Fighter Squadron predates the 332d Fighter Group, being formed on 19 February 1942. The 100th carried out advanced fighter training of graduates of the Tuskegee Institute primary and basic flight training programs for African-American flight cadets at nearby Moton Field. The first class (42-C) of twelve cadets and one student officer, Captain Benjamin O. Davis Jr., who served as Commandant of Cadets, began training on 19 July 1941. On March 6, 1942, this class graduated with Davis and five of the original twelve cadets, 2Lt. Lemuel R. Custis, 2Lt. Charles DeBow, 2Lt. George S. Roberts, and 2Lt. Mac Ross. "Spanky" Roberts was actually the first cadet to receive a diploma and wings during the ceremony. He went on throughout the time of combat operations of the 99th Fighter Squadron and later when that squadron was assigned to the 332nd Fighter Group (which already consisted of three squadrons), to be the Deputy Commanding Officer and at times when Colonel Davis was away, he served as the Group Commander.

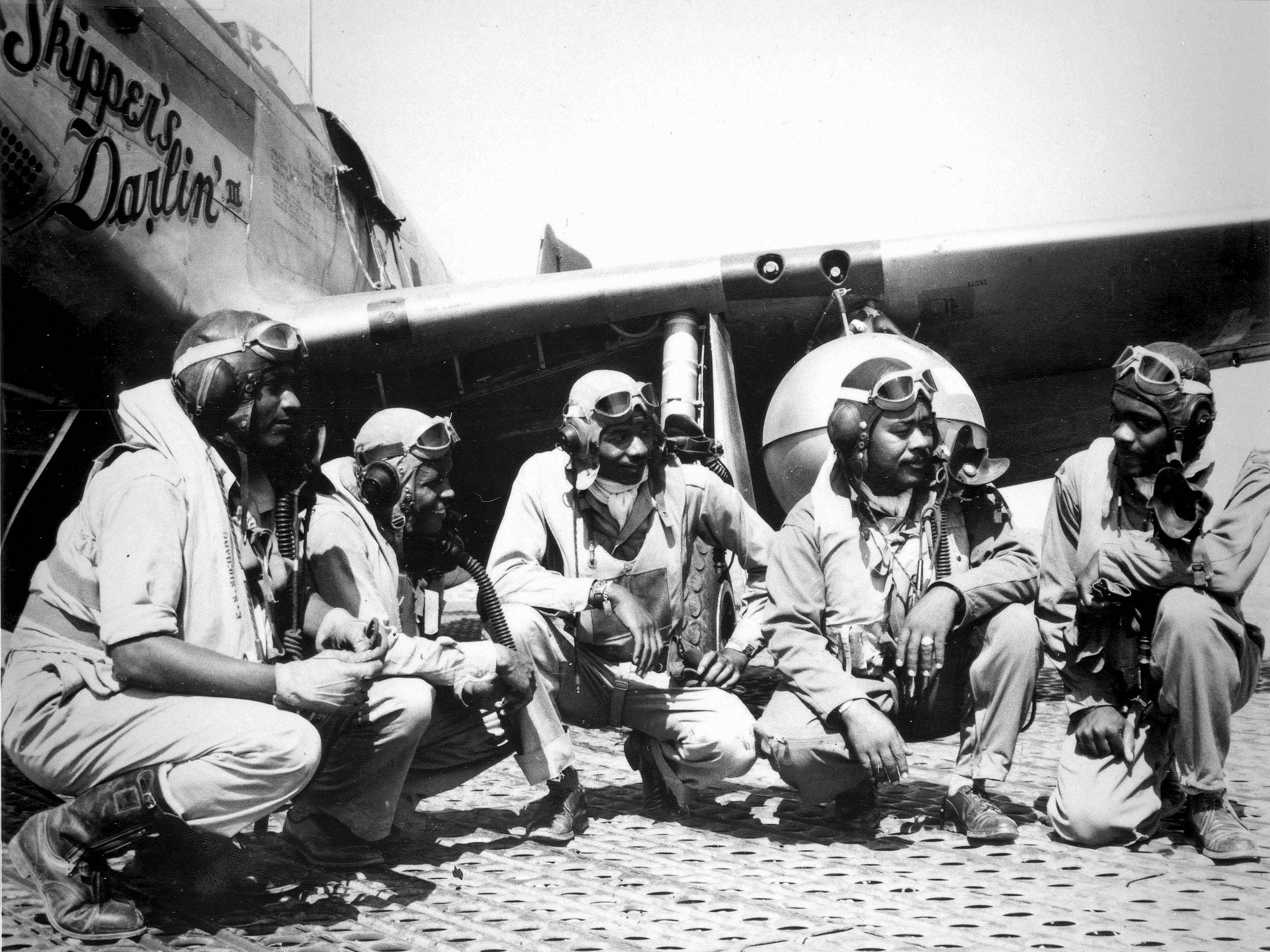
Pilots of the 332d Fighter Group, "Tuskegee Airmen," the elite, all-African American 332d Fighter Group at Ramitelli Airfield, Italy. From left to right, Lt. Dempsey W. Morgran, Lt. Carroll S. Woods, Lt. Robert H. Nelron Jr., Capt. Andrew D. Turner, and Lt. Clarence P. Lester.

After difficulty in establishing a core of African American pilots and ground crews and providing for training at Tuskegee AAF and First Air Force stations in Michigan, by April 1943, the 332d Fighter Group deployed to Twelfth Air Force in the Mediterranean theater. The group's first combat assignment involved attacking enemy units on the strategic volcanic island of Pantelleria in the Mediterranean Sea, to clear the sea lanes for the Allied invasion of Sicily in July 1943. The air assault on the island began on 30 May 1943. The assignment to a predominately ground attack role prevented the 99th from engaging in air-to-air combat.

In September 1943 the unit was criticized by Col. William W. Momyer for "(failure) to display...aggressiveness and daring for combat" and recommended for removal from operations. Congressional hearings were held on this perceived failure, with the aim of disbanding the squadron. However, neither the recommendation nor the hearings shut down the unit after an AAF study reported that the 99th had performed as well as other P-40 units in the Mediterranean. In the meantime the 99th received a Distinguished Unit Citation for its performance in combat on Sicily. Shortly after a Washington hearing on the feasibility of continuing to use African American pilots, three new fighter squadrons graduated from training at Tuskegee: the 100th, 301st and 302nd. The units then embarked for Africa and were combined to form the all-Black 332d Fighter Group.

The squadrons were moved to mainland Italy. On 27 and 28 January 1944, Luftwaffe Focke-Wulf Fw 190 fighter-bombers raided Anzio, where the Allies had conducted amphibious landings on 22 January. Attached to the 79th Fighter Group, 11 of the 99th Fighter Squadron's pilots shot down enemy fighters. Captain Charles B. Hall claimed two shot down, bringing his aerial victory total to three. The eight fighter squadrons defending Anzio together claimed 32 German aircraft shot down, while the 99th claimed the highest score among them with 13. They began operations with Twelfth Air Force on 5 February. They used P-39s to escort convoys, protect harbors, and fly armed reconnaissance missions, converted to Republic P-47 Thunderbolts during April–May, and changed to North American P-51 Mustangs in June.

The 99th Fighter Squadron, assigned to the group on 1 May 1944, joined them on 6 June at Ramitelli Airfield, in the small city of Campomarino, on the Adriatic coast. From Ramitelli, the 332d Fighter Group escorted Fifteenth Air Force heavy strategic bombing raids into Czechoslovakia, Austria, Hungary, Poland and Germany from May 1944 to April 1945. The bombers struck objectives such as oil refineries, factories, airfields, and marshaling yards in Italy, France, Germany, Poland, Czechoslovakia, Austria, Hungary, Yugoslavia, Romania, Bulgaria, and Greece. They also made successful strafing attacks on airdromes, railroads, highways, bridges, river traffic, troop concentrations, radar facilities, power stations, and other targets. The 332d also flew escort missions in support of the repatriation of Americans from Romania (Operation Reunion) and Yugoslavia (Operation Halyard) to Italy. Flying escort for heavy bombers, the 332d earned an impressive combat record. The Allies called these airmen "Red Tails" or "Red-Tail Angels," because of the distinctive crimson paint prominently visible on the tail section of the unit's aircraft.

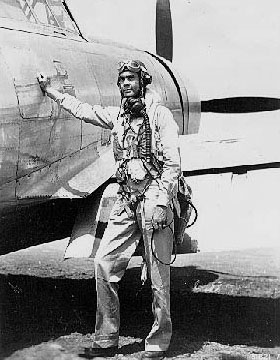
Col. Benjamin O. Davis Jr., commander of the Tuskegee Airmen 332d Fighter Group, in front of his P-47 Thunderbolt in Sicily

The Tuskegee Airmen initially were equipped with Curtiss P-40F and L model Warhawks (99th Squadron only), briefly with Bell P-39 Airacobras (March 1944), later with Republic P-47 Thunderbolts (June–July 1944), and finally with the aircraft with which they became most commonly identified, the North American P-51 Mustang (July 1944).

The unit received a Distinguished Unit Citation for a mission on 24 March 1945 when the group escorted B-17s during a raid on the Daimler-Benz tank factory at Berlin, fought the Messerschmitt Me 262 jet interceptors that attacked the formation, and strafed transportation facilities while flying back to the base in Italy. During the action, its pilots were credited with destroying three Me 262s of the Luftwaffe's all-jet Jagdgeschwader 7 in aerial combat that day, despite the American unit initially claiming 11 Me 262s on that particular mission. Upon examination of German records, JG 7 records, just four Me 262s were lost and all of the pilots survived. In return, the 463rd Bomb Group, one of the many B-17 groups the 332d were escorting, lost two bombers, and the 332d lost three P-51s during the mission. Fifteenth Air Force dispatched about 660 bombers, 250 of these headed for Berlin. Altogether, Fifteenth Air Force lost nine B-17s and one B-24, out of the fighter escort, five P-51 Mustangs were destroyed during this sortie. Three of the four Me 262 jets that were lost by the Luftwaffe were reportedly shot down, all their pilots bailed out wounded.

Flying escort for heavy bombers, the 332d earned an impressive combat record. The Allies called these airmen "Redtails" or "Redtail Angels," because of the distinctive crimson paint applied on the vertical stabilizers of the unit's aircraft. (Note: The red markings that distinguished the Tuskegee Airmen included red bands on the noses of P-47s as well as a red rudder, the P-51B and D Mustangs flew with similar color schemes, with red propeller spinners, red wing bands and all-red tail surfaces. Rice, Markus. "The Men and Their Airplanes: The Fighters." Tuskegee Airmen, 1 March 2000.)

With the end of hostilities in Europe in May 1945, the 332d was reassigned to the 305th Bombardment Wing, to prepare for a move to the Pacific Theater and engage in combat against Japan. With the atomic bombings of Hiroshima and Nagasaki and the end of the war, this became unnecessary and the 332d returned to the United States and was assigned to Camp Kilmer, New Jersey, where it inactivated on 19 October 1945.

=== Postwar era ===
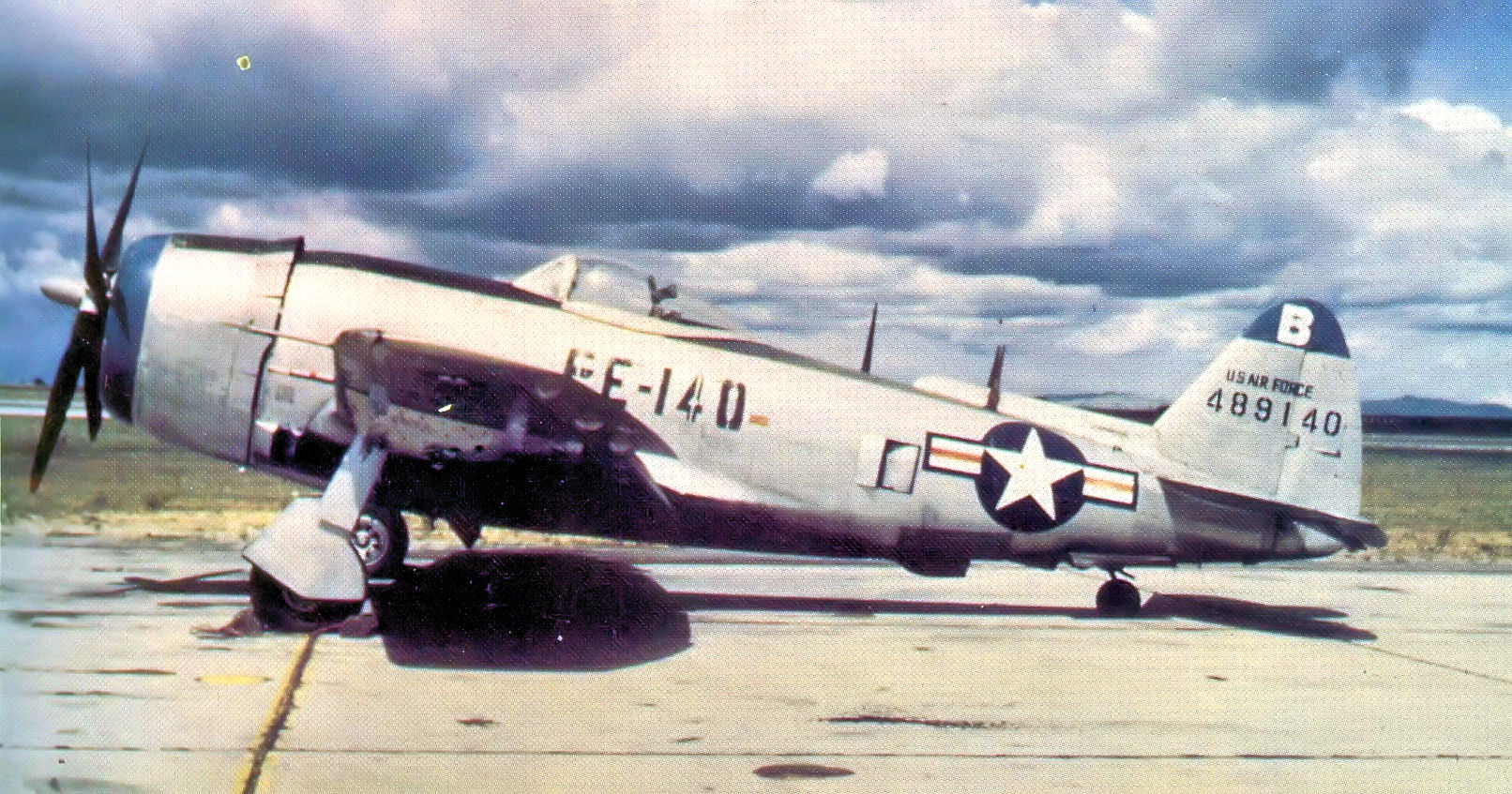
F-47N 44-8914 at Lockbourne AFB, Ohio, 1948

The unit was activated again in 1947 at Lockbourne Army Air Base as operational component of 332d Fighter Wing, with Col. Davis in command. The group was finally inactivated in 1949 as part of the Air Force plan to achieve racial integration.

=== Air Expeditionary Group ===
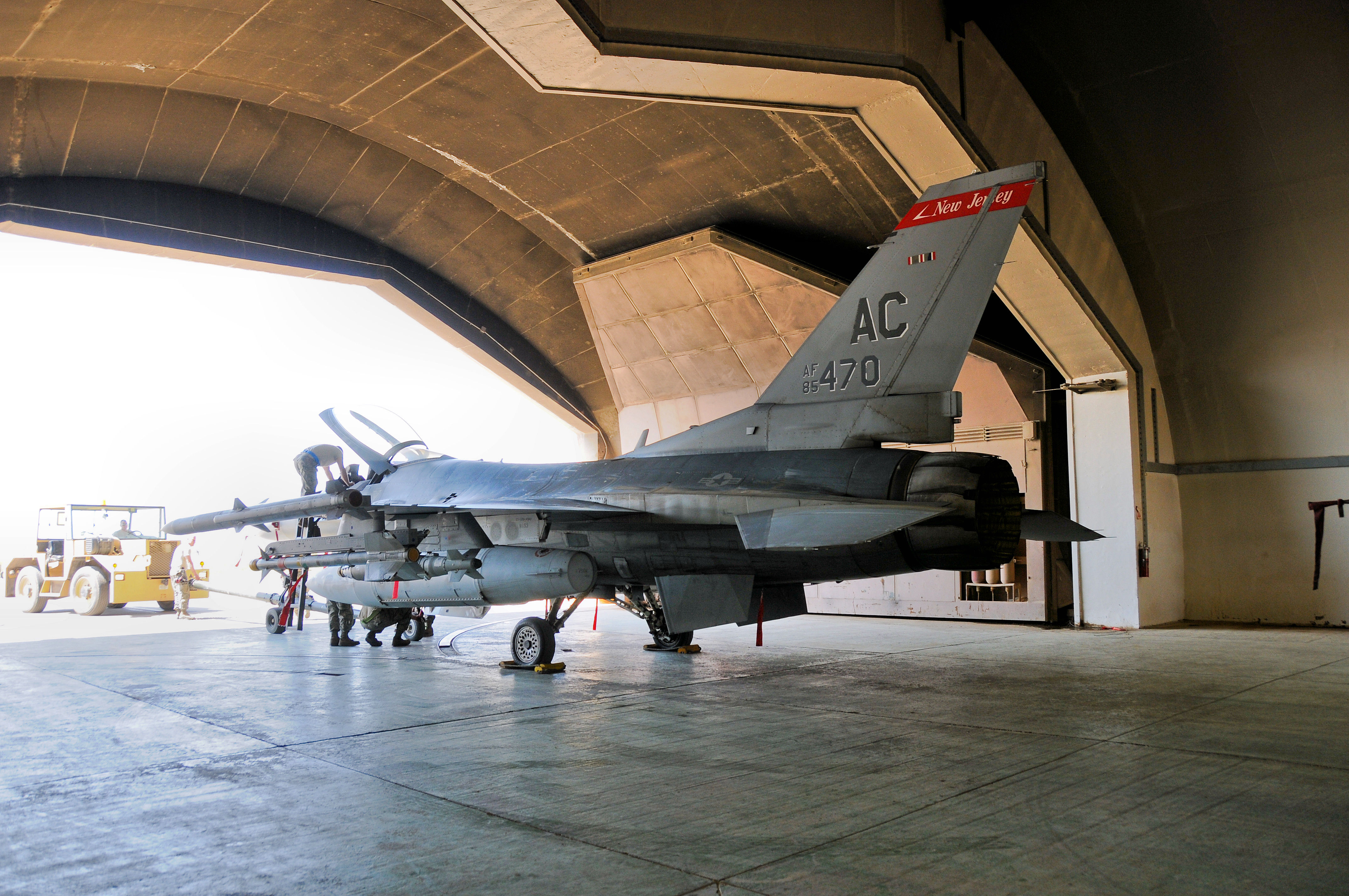
Members of the 332d Expeditionary Aircraft Maintenance Squadron (EAMXS), place an F-16C+ Fighting Falcon from the 119th Expeditionary Fighter Squadron, New Jersey ANG back in a hardened aircraft shelter at Joint Base Balad, Iraq on 4 May 2010

In 1998, the 332d Air Expeditionary Group, "The Tip of the Spear", was activated at Ahmad al-Jaber Air Base, Kuwait in November 1998, replacing the 4406th Operations Group (Provisional) which was formed in 1996. The 332d Group evolved and grew to reflect the Aerospace Expeditionary Force (AEF) concept of a consolidated force in a forward location. The package previously included McDonnell Douglas F-15E Strike Eagles and Fairchild Republic A-10 Thunderbolt IIs.

The mission of the 332d was supporting Joint Task Force – Southwest Asia, which monitored a no-fly zone mission dubbed Operation Southern Watch. Active duty, Guard and Reserve A-10 and F-16 fighter units, along with support individuals, rotated in and out, ensuring Iraqi aircraft don't fly below the 32d parallel. At the Al Jaber AFB the 332 ELS Commander and 10 personnel are on a one-year tour; all others (1190 personnel) rotate every 90 days. That mix of aircraft, including HH-60 rescue helicopters, gave the 332d the ability to conduct any Operation Southern Watch mission.

The group's personnel turned over almost completely every 120 days with a population of 1,400 people constantly rotating, a need existed for continuity to guide the base and its mission. The US compound at Al Jaber was a sandy "fortress" of less than a mile's circumference. Most people lived in dorms—airmen doing 12-month rotations had their own rooms.

Beginning in 2001, after Al Qaeda's attack on 9/11, the 332d Air Expeditionary Group participated in Operation Enduring Freedom in Afghanistan. The group's F-15Es, F-16s, and later A-10s played a critical role in the defeat of Al Qaeda and the Taliban and later provided key air support for the provisional government in Afghanistan. Significantly, the F-15Es and F-16s saved a team of US Army soldiers, US Navy SEALS and US Air Force Combat Controllers and PJ pinned down after the helicopter in which they were flying was disabled by a rocket propelled grenade (RPG) in the mountains of Afghanistan at Takur Ghar on what is now known as "Roberts' Ridge". The fighters employed both 20mm cannon and GBU-12 laser guided bombs on Al Qaeda militants as they proceeded up the mountain in an effort to capture or kill the crashed Americans, saving over 2 dozen American lives.

Later, the unit was expanded to a wing, with the 332d Air Expeditionary Group operating as the operational component of the 332d Air Expeditionary Wing after the initiation of Operation Iraqi Freedom (OIF). It was moved to Tallil Air Base, Iraq, in support of OIF, then moving to Balad Air Base, Iraq, in 2004.

During the height of operations, the 332d Wing contained nine groups—including four geographically separated groups at Ali Air Base, Sather Air Base, Al Asad Air Base, and Kirkuk Air Base — as well as numerous detachments and operating locations scattered throughout Iraq. The wing had as many as four fighter squadrons, an airlift squadron, a helicopter combat search and rescue squadron, two aerial reconnaissance squadrons and an air control squadron.

During the drawdown of forces from Iraq, the 332d Wing provided intelligence, surveillance and reconnaissance, combat search and rescue, armed overwatch and close air support to one of the largest logistics movements since World War II.

In support of the reposture of U.S. forces, the wing continued to support U.S. Forces-Iraq after forward deploying to an undisclosed air base in Southwest Asia in November 2011 so Joint Base Balad could be returned to the government of Iraq. And as the last U.S. convoy left Iraq on 18 December 2011, it was the 332d AEW's F-16s and MQ-1B Predators in the skies providing overhead watch.

The 332d Air Expeditionary Group was reactivated on 16 November 2014 at Ahmad al-Jaber Air Base, Kuwait.

Colonel Mike Kocheski assumed command of the 332nd Air Expeditionary Wing, redesignated from the 332nd Air Expeditionary Group, during an activation ceremony on May 19, 2015.

== Lineage ==
Legacy World War II 332d Fighter Group emblem

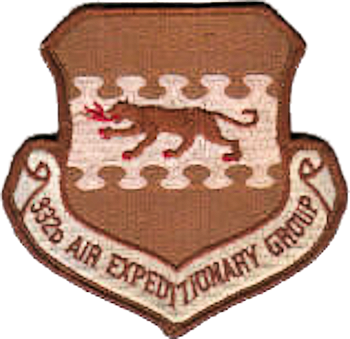
322d AEG Desert camouflage emblem

- Constituted as the 332d Fighter Group on 4 July 1942

Activated on 13 October 1942
Inactivated on 19 October 1945

- Activated on 1 July 1947

Inactivated on 26 August 1948

- Activated on 26 August 1948

Inactivated on 1 July 1949

- Converted to provisional status, redesignated 332d Air Expeditionary Group and assigned to Air Combat Command to activate or inactivate on 1 October 1998

Activated in October 1998, assuming personnel and equipment of 4406th Operations Group (Provisional).
Redesignated 332d Expeditionary Operations Group on 12 August 2002
Inactivated on 8 May 2012

- Redesignated 332d Air Expeditionary Group on 16 November 2014.

=== Assignments ===
- Third Air Force, 13 October 1942
- First Air Force, 29 March 1943
- XII Fighter Command, 3 February 1944
- 306th Fighter Wing, 28 May 1944
- Army Service Forces (for inactivation), 17–19 October 1945
- 332d Fighter Wing, 1 July 1947 – 26 August 1948; 26 August 1948 – 1 July 1949
- Air Combat Command, October 1998

Attached to: United States Central Command Air Forces, October 1998 – 12 August 2002

- 332d Air Expeditionary Wing, 12 August 2002 – 8 May 2012
- 332d Air Expeditionary Wing, 16 November 2014 – present

=== Components ===
==== World War II/Postwar era ====
- 99th Fighter Squadron: 1 May 1944 – 22 June 1945; 1 June 1947 – 1 July 1949 (attached to 86th Fighter Group, 11–30 June 1944)
- 100th Fighter Squadron: 13 October 1942 – 19 October 1945; 1 June 1947 – 1 July 1949
- 301st Fighter Squadron: 13 October 1942 – 19 October 1945; 1 June 1947 – 1 July 1949
- 302d Fighter Squadron: 13 October 1942 – 6 March 1945

==== 332d AEG/EOG Attached Squadrons, 1998–present ====
Known units include:

- Ahmed Al Jaber Air Base, Kuwait, Operations Southern Watch (1998–2003) and Enduring Freedom (2001–2003)

4th Fighter Squadron
41st Rescue Squadron
103d Fighter Squadron (Pennsylvania ANG)
121st Fighter Squadron (D.C. ANG)
332d Expeditionary Rescue Squadron
492d Fighter Squadron
70th Fighter Squadron
18th Fighter Squadron
355th Fighter Squadron

- Mazar-e Sharif, Konduz, Bagram, Kabul & Tora Bora, Afghanistan, Operation Enduring Freedom (2001–2003)

39th Rescue Squadron (Ahmed Al Jaber Air Base, Kuwait)
682d Air Support Operations Squadron (Shaw AFB, SC)

- Tallil Air Base, Iraq, Operation Iraqi Freedom (2003–2004)

303d Expeditionary Fighter Squadron (AFRES)
332d Expeditionary Medical Squadron
392d Expeditionary Fighter Squadron

- Balad Air Base, Iraq, Operation Iraqi Freedom (2004–2011)

13th Expeditionary Fighter Squadron
14th Expeditionary Fighter Squadron
34th Expeditionary Fighter Squadron
362d Expeditionary Reconnaissance Squadron

379th Expeditionary Aeromedical Evacuation
421st Expeditionary Fighter Squadron
510th Expeditionary Fighter Squadron
555th Expeditionary Fighter Squadron

- Ahmed Al Jaber Air Base, Kuwait, Operation Inherent Resolve (2014–present)

107th Expeditionary Fighter Squadron

=== Stations ===
- Tuskegee Army Air Field, Alabama, 13 October 1942
- Selfridge Field, Michigan, 29 March 1943
- Oscoda Army Air Field, Michigan, 12 April 1943
- Selfridge Field, Michigan, 9 July – 22 December 1943
- Montecorvino Airfield, Italy, 3 February 1944
- Capodichino Airfield, Italy, 15 April 1944
- Ramitelli Airfield, Italy, 28 May 1944
- Cattolica Airfield, Italy, c. 4 May 1945
- Lucera Airfield, Italy, c. 18 July–September 1945
- Camp Kilmer, New Jersey, 17–19 October 1945
- Lockbourne Army Air Base (later Lockbourne Air Force Base), Ohio, 1 July 1947 – 1 July 1949
- Ahmad al-Jaber Air Base, Kuwait, 1 October 1998
- Tallil Air Base, Iraq, March 2003
- Balad Air Base (later Joint Base Balad), Iraq, 2004
- Ahmed Al Jaber Air Base, Kuwait, 18 December 2011 – 8 May 2012
- Ahmed Al Jaber Air Base, Kuwait, 16 November 2014 – present

=== Aircraft ===
- Bell P-39 Airacobra, 1942–1944
- Curtiss P-40 Warhawk, 1942–1944
- Republic P-47 (later F-47) Thunderbolt, 1944, 1947–1948; 1948–1949
- North American P-51D Mustang, 1944–1945
- Fairchild Republic OA-10 Thunderbolt II, 1995, 1999, 2001–2002
- McDonnell Douglas F/A-18C/D Hornet, 2002
- General Atomics MQ-1A Predator, 2003–2011
- Sikorsky HH-60 Pave Hawk, 2003–2011
- F-16C/D Fighting Falcon, 2001–2011
- McDonnell Douglas F-15D Eagle, 2003–2011
- McDonnell Douglas F-15E Strike Eagle, 2001–2011
- Lockheed C-130 Hercules, 2003–2011
- Fairchild Republic A-10 Thunderbolt II, 2007–2011, 2014–
- Beechcraft MC-12W Liberty, 2009–2011

=== Campaigns ===
- American Theater Service Streamer (World War II)
- Europe, Africa, Mediterranean Theater Streamers (World War II)
  - Rome-Arno
  - Normandy
  - Northern France
  - Southern France
  - North Apennines
  - Rhineland
  - Central Europe
  - Po Valley
  - Air Combat EAME Theater

=== Decorations ===
- Distinguished Unit Citation Italy, 24 March 1945
- Gallant Unit Citation Kuwait/Afghanistan, 15 October 2001 – 15 April 2002
- Air Force Outstanding Unit Award Kuwait, 1 June 2000 – 31 May 2002

== See also ==
- Executive Order 9981
- Fly (2009 play about the 332d Fighter Group)
- List of African-American Medal of Honor recipients
- Military history of African Americans
- Port Chicago disaster
- Red Ball Express
