= Cattolica Airfield =

World War II military airfield in Italy

Cattolica Airfield

Site information
- Type: Military Airfield
- Controlled by: United States Army Air Forces

Location
- Coordinates: 43°57′42″N 12°41′00″E (Approximate)

Site history
- Built: 1944
- In use: 1944

Location of Cattolica Airfield, Italy

Cattolica Airfield is an abandoned World War II military airfield in Italy, which was located in the vicinity of Cattolica (Provincia di Rimini, Emilia-Romagna); about 230 km north-northeast of Rome. It was a temporary all-weather airfield used by the 332d Fighter Group between 4 May and 18 July 1945.

Today, part of the land on which the airfield existed is located in Santa Monica circuit of Misano Adriatico near Cattolica.
