= Benjamin O. Davis Jr. =

World War II pilot & first African-American US Air Force general officer (1912–2002)

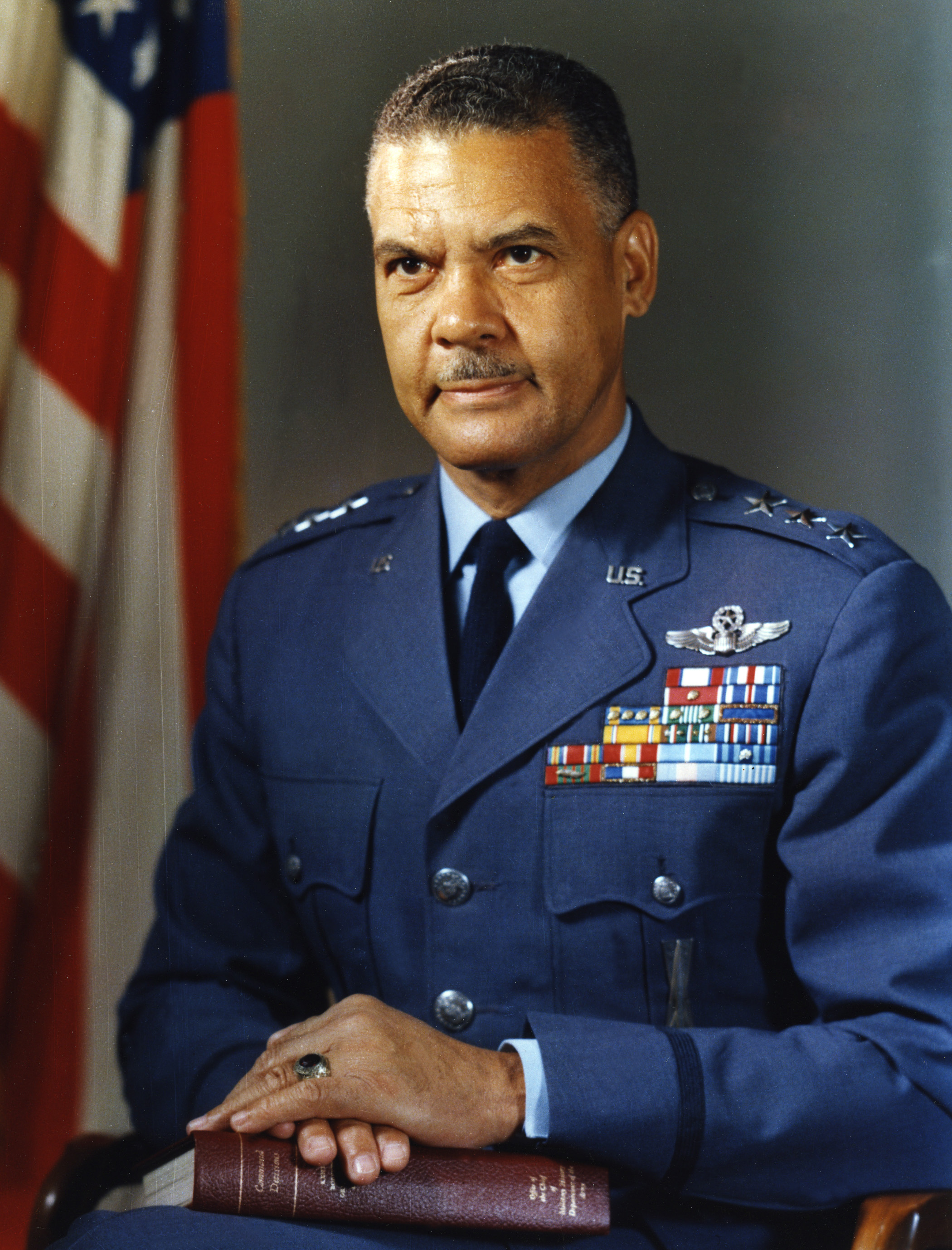
- Davis c. 1965–1970
- Born: December 18, 1912; Washington, D.C., United States
- Died: July 4, 2002 (aged 89); Washington, D.C., United States
- Burial place: Arlington National Cemetery
- Spouse: Agatha Scott
- Relatives: Benjamin O. Davis Sr. (father)
- Military career
- Allegiance: United States
- Branch: United States Army; United States Air Force
- Service years: 1930–1970
- Rank: General
- Commands: 99th Pursuit Squadron; 332nd Fighter Group; Tuskegee Airmen; 51st Fighter Wing; Thirteenth Air Force
- Conflicts: World War II; Korean War; Second Taiwan Strait Crisis; Vietnam War
- Awards: Air Force Distinguished Service Medal (2); Army Distinguished Service Medal; Silver Star; Legion of Merit (3); Distinguished Flying Cross; Air Medal (5); Army Commendation Medal (3); Langley Gold Medal
- Other work: Federal Sky Marshal Program; Assistant Secretary of Transportation

Benjamin Oliver Davis Jr. (December 18, 1912 – July 4, 2002) was a United States Air Force (USAF) general and commander of the World War II Tuskegee Airmen.

He was the first African-American brigadier general in the USAF. After his retirement, on December 9, 1998, he was advanced to four-star general by President Bill Clinton. During World War II, Davis was commander of the 99th Fighter Squadron and the 332nd Fighter Group, which escorted bombers on air combat missions over Europe. Davis flew sixty missions in P-39 Airacobra, Curtiss P-40 Warhawk, P-47 Thunderbolt, and P-51 Mustang fighters and was one of the first African-American pilots to see combat. Davis followed in his father's footsteps in breaking racial barriers, as Benjamin O. Davis Sr. had been the first Black general in the United States Army.

== Early life ==
Benjamin Oliver Davis Jr. was born in Washington, D.C. on December 18, 1912, the second of three children born to Benjamin O. Davis Sr. and Elnora Dickerson Davis. His father was a U.S. Army officer, a lieutenant at that time, stationed in Wyoming with the 9th Cavalry, a segregated African-American regiment. Davis Sr. served 41 years before he was promoted to brigadier general in October 1940. Elnora Davis died from complications after giving birth to their third child in 1916.

In the summer of 1926, at age 13, Davis Jr (or Davis) flew with a barnstorming pilot at Bolling Field in Washington, D.C. The experience led to his determination to become a pilot himself.

In 1929, at the beginning of the Great Depression, Davis graduated from Central High School in Cleveland, Ohio. That same year, he began attending Western Reserve University (1929–1930).

== Early military career ==
In July 1932, after attending the University of Chicago, Davis entered the United States Military Academy (West Point). He graduated from West Point in 1936, becoming the first black man to do so since 1889. His sponsor was Representative Oscar De Priest (R-IL) of Chicago, who was, at the time, the only black member of Congress.

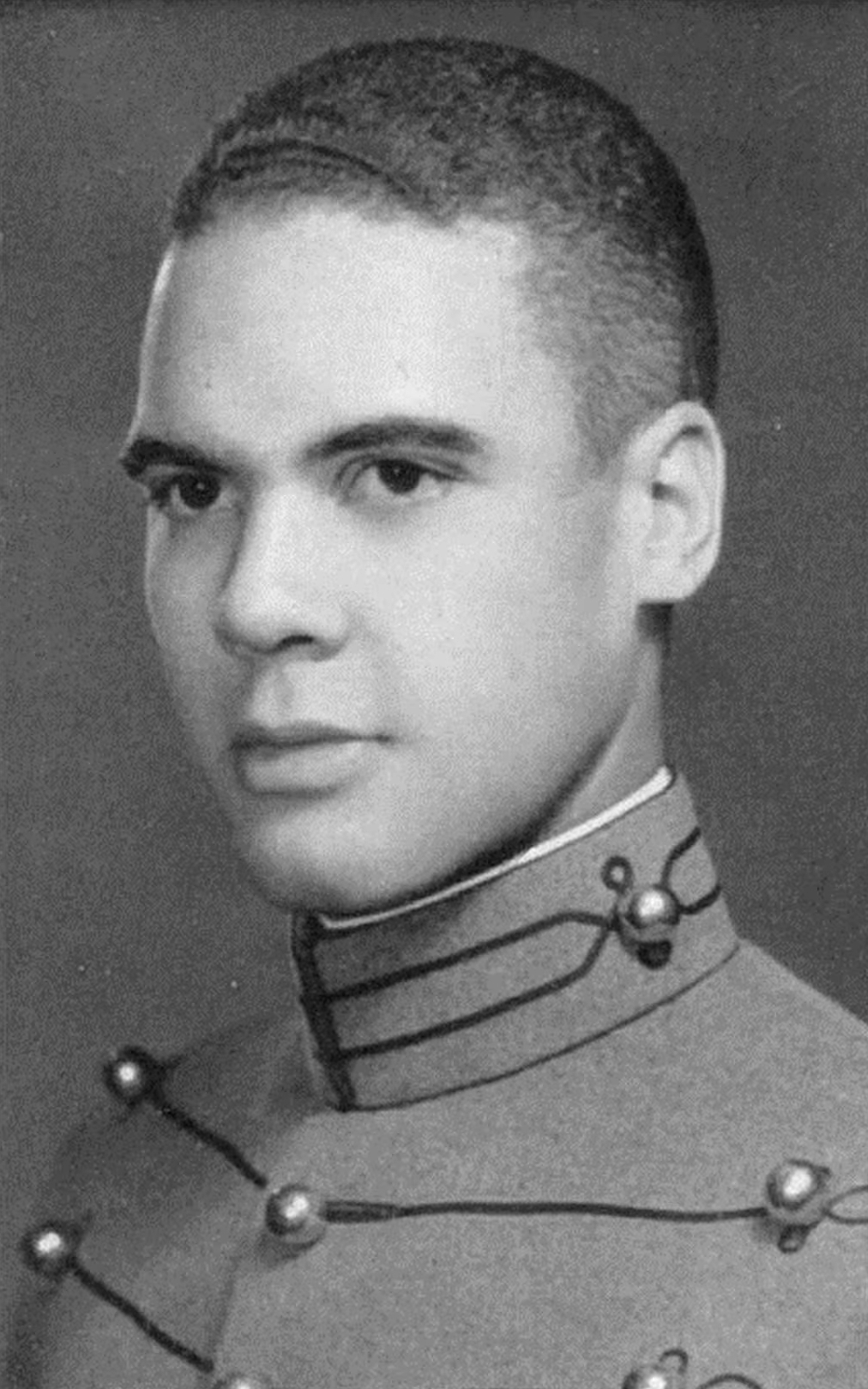
Davis in the United States Military Academy yearbook, 1936

During his four years at the academy, Davis was isolated by his white classmates on account of his race. He never had a roommate. He ate by himself. His classmates rarely spoke to him outside the line of duty, intending that their "silent treatment" would drive him from the academy. It had the opposite effect; it steeled his determination to endure the animosity and to compete and graduate. Ultimately, his perseverance earned the respect of his classmates, as evidenced by a biographical note of Davis in the 1936 yearbook, the Howitzer:

"The courage, tenacity, and intelligence with which he conquered a problem incomparably more difficult than plebe year won for him the sincere admiration of his classmates, and his single-minded determination to continue in his chosen career cannot fail to inspire respect wherever fortune may lead him."

Davis graduated in June 1936, 35th in a class of 276. He was the academy's fourth black graduate after Henry Ossian Flipper (1877), John Hanks Alexander (1887), and Charles Young (1889). When he was commissioned as a second lieutenant, the Army had only two black officers who weren't chaplains – Benjamin O. Davis Sr. and Benjamin O. Davis Jr. After graduation, he married Agatha Scott, whom he had met while a cadet at West Point.

At the start of his junior year at West Point, Davis had applied for the Army Air Corps but was rejected because it did not accept African Americans. In 1936, the U.S. Army assigned Davis to the all-black 24th Infantry Regiment (one of the original Buffalo Soldier regiments) at Fort Benning, Georgia. He was not allowed inside the base officers' club based on his race.

In June 1937, Davis attended the U.S. Army Infantry School at Fort Benning. He was later assigned to teach military tactics at Tuskegee Institute, a historically black college in Tuskegee, Alabama. This was the same assignment his father was given years before; it was a way for the Army to avoid placing a black officer in command of white soldiers.

== World War II ==
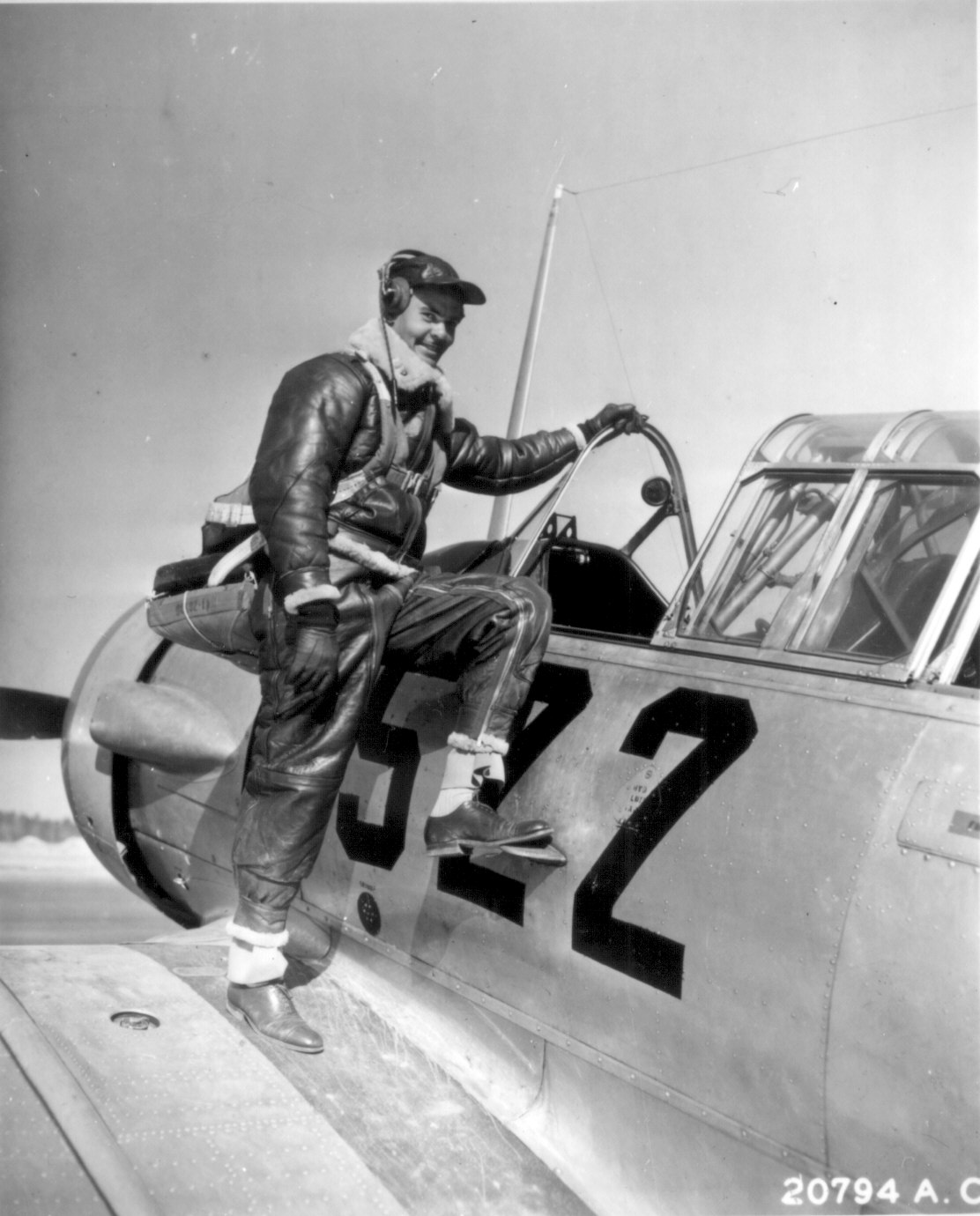
Captain Benjamin Oliver Davis Jr. of Washington, D.C., climbing into an Advanced Trainer (Tuskegee, Alabama; January 1942).

Early in 1941, the Roosevelt administration, in response to public pressure for greater black participation in the military as war approached, ordered the War Department to create a black flying unit. Captain Davis was assigned to the first training class at Tuskegee Army Air Field (hence the name Tuskegee Airmen). In July 1941, Davis entered aviation cadet training with the Tuskegee Airmen's first class of aviation cadets, Class 42-C-SE. On March 6, 1942, Davis graduated from aviation cadet training with Captain George S. Roberts, 2nd Lt. Charles DeBow Jr. (Feb 13, 1918 – April 4, 1986), 2nd Lt. Mac Ross (1912–1944), and 2nd Lt. Lemuel R. Custis (1915–2005). Davis and his four classmates became the first African American combat fighter pilots in the U.S. military.

Davis was the first African American officer to solo an Army Air Corps aircraft. In July that year, having been promoted to lieutenant colonel, he was named commander of the first all-black air unit, the 99th Pursuit Squadron.

The squadron, equipped with Curtiss P-40 fighters, was sent to Tunisia in North Africa in the spring of 1943. On June 2, they saw combat for the first time in a dive-bombing mission against the German-held island of Pantelleria as part of Operation Corkscrew. The squadron later supported the Allied invasion of Sicily.

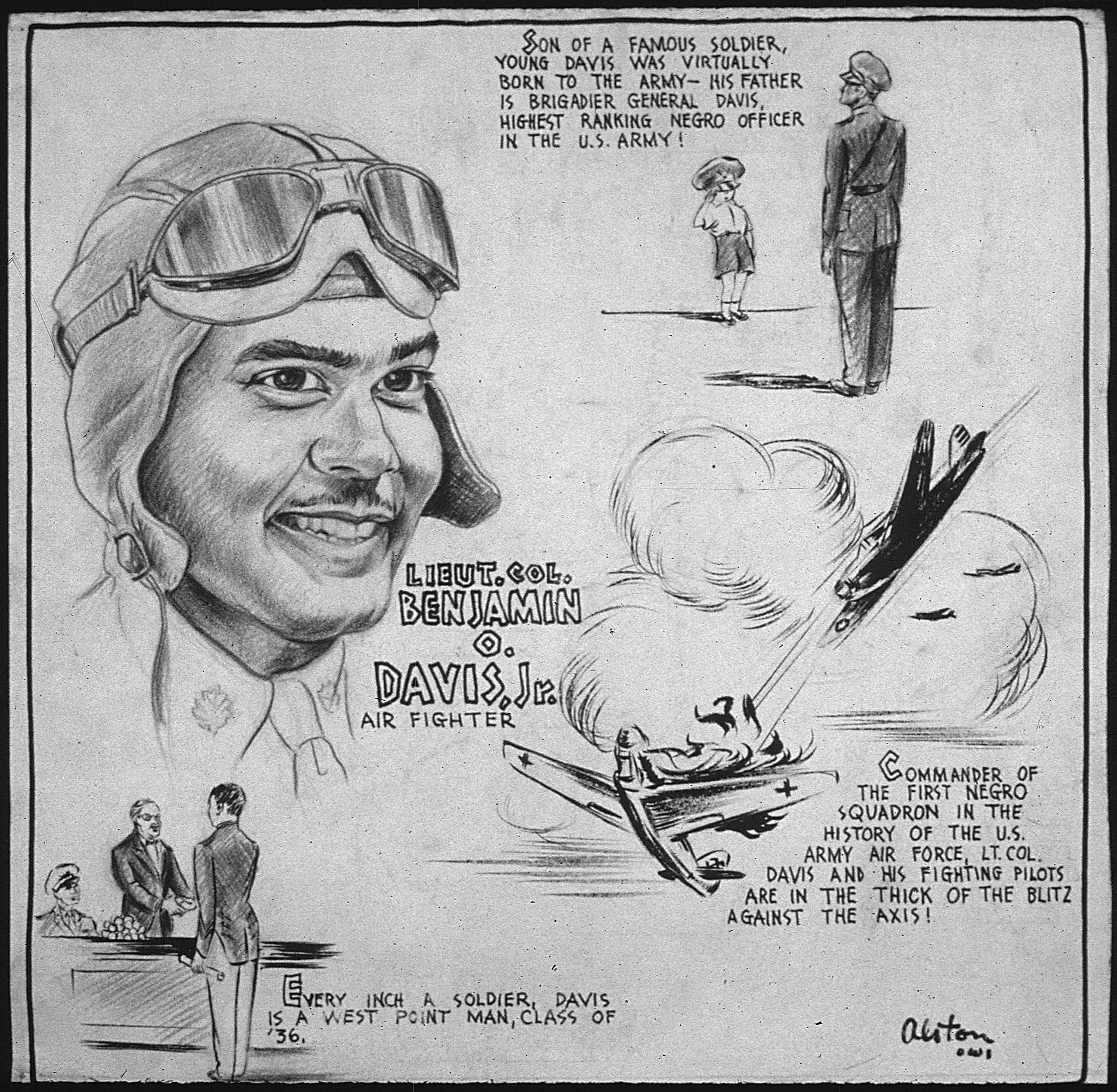
Illustration by Charles Henry Alston

In September 1943, Davis was deployed to the United States to take command of the 332nd Fighter Group, a larger all-black unit preparing to go overseas. Soon after his arrival, there was an attempt to stop the use of black pilots in combat. Senior officers in the Army Air Forces recommended to the Army chief of staff, General George Marshall, that the 99th (Davis's old unit) be removed from combat operations as it had performed poorly. This infuriated Davis as he had never been told of any deficiencies with the unit. He held a news conference at The Pentagon to defend his men and then presented his case to a War Department committee studying the use of black servicemen.

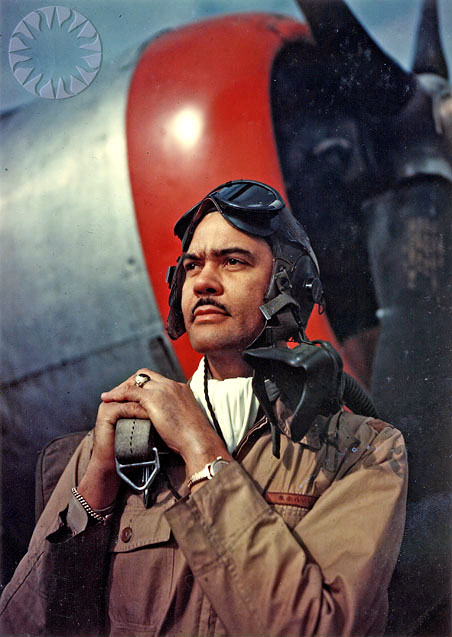
Colonel Davis standing near the nose of a P-47 Thunderbolt, 1944

Marshall ordered an inquiry but allowed the 99th to continue fighting in the meantime. The inquiry eventually reported that the 99th's performance was comparable to other air units, but any questions about the squadron's fitness were answered in January 1944 when its pilots shot down 12 German planes in two days while protecting the Anzio beachhead.

Colonel Davis and his 332nd Fighter Group arrived in Italy soon after that. The four-squadron group, which was called the Red Tails for the distinctive markings of its planes, were based at Ramitelli Airfield and flew many missions deep into German territory. By summer 1944 the Group had transitioned to P-47 Thunderbolts. In the summer of 1945, Davis took over the all-black 477th Bombardment Group, which was stationed at Godman Field, Kentucky.

During the war, the airmen commanded by Davis had compiled an outstanding record in combat against the Luftwaffe. They flew more than 15,000 sorties, shot down 112 enemy planes, and destroyed or damaged 273 on the ground at a cost of 66 of their own planes and losing only about twenty-five bombers. Davis himself led 67 missions in P-47s and P-51 Mustangs. He received the Silver Star for a strafing run into Austria and the Distinguished Flying Cross for a bomber-escort mission to Munich on June 9, 1944.

=== Freeman Field Mutiny 1945 ===
Davis was one of ten officers to preside over the Freeman Field mutiny courts-martial; appointed by General Frank O'Driscoll Hunter. They were: Colonel Benjamin O. Davis Jr., Captain George L. Knox II, Captain James T. Wiley, Captain John H. Duren, Captain Charles R. Stanton, Captain William T. Yates, Captain Elmore M. Kennedy, Captain Fitzroy Newsum, 1st Lieutenant William Robert Ming Jr. and 1st Lieutenant James Y. Carter. Trial Judge Advocates were: Captain James W. Redden and 1st Lieutenant Charles B. Hall.

== United States Air Force ==
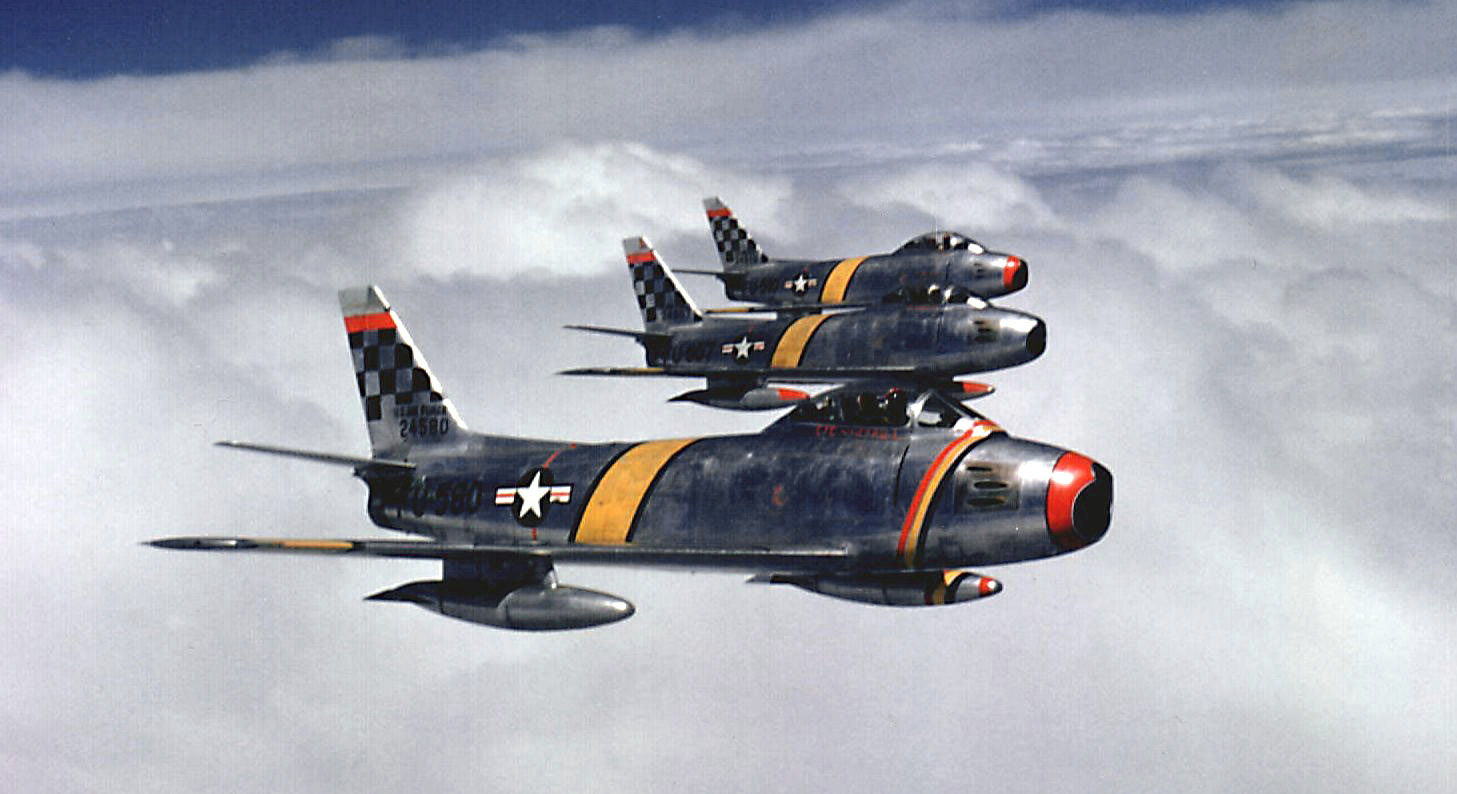
Colonel Davis, commander of the 51st FIW, leads a formation of F-86F Sabres during the Korean War, 1953

In July 1948, President Harry S. Truman signed Executive Order 9981 ordering the racial integration of the armed forces. Colonel Davis helped draft the Air Force plan for implementing this order. The Air Force was the first of the services to integrate fully.

In 1949, Davis attended Air War College. He later served at the Pentagon and in overseas posts over the next two decades. Noteworthy is that during his time at the Pentagon, he drafted the staffing package and gained approval to create the Air Force Thunderbird flight demonstration team. He again saw combat in 1953 when he assumed command of the 51st Fighter-Interceptor Wing (51 FIW) and flew an F-86 Sabre in Korea. He served as director of operations and training at Far East Air Forces Headquarters, Tokyo, from 1954 until 1955, when he assumed the position of vice commander of Thirteenth Air Force, with additional duty as commander of Air Task Force 13 (Provisional), Taipei, Taiwan. During his time in Tokyo, he was temporarily promoted to the rank of brigadier general.

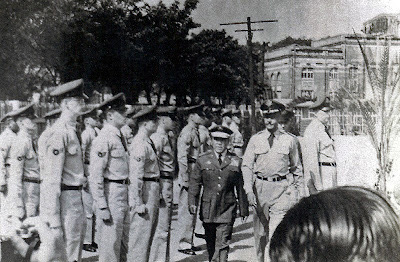
4 April 1956, the “Official Opening” of the Air Task Force Thirteen (Provisional) new compound took place and was attended by high ranking ROCAF officers including General Wang Shu-ming, Commanding General, ROC Air Force and Brigadier General Benjamin O. Davis Jr, Commander, Air Task Force Thirteen (Provisional), Taipei, Taiwan.

In April 1957, General Davis arrived at Ramstein Air Base, West Germany, as chief of staff of Twelfth Air Force, U.S. Air Forces in Europe (USAFE). When the Twelfth Air Force was transferred to James Connally Air Force Base, Texas in December 1957, he assumed new duties as deputy chief of staff for operations, Headquarters USAFE, Wiesbaden Air Base, West Germany. While in West Germany he was temporarily promoted to major general in 1959, and his promotion to brigadier general was made permanent in 1960.

In July 1961, he returned to the United States and Headquarters U.S. Air Force, where he served as the director of manpower and organization, deputy chief of staff for programs and requirements. Davis's promotion to major general was made permanent early the next year, and in February 1965 he was assigned as assistant deputy chief of staff, programs and requirements. He remained in that position until his assignment as chief of staff for the United Nations Command and U.S. Forces in Korea (USFK) in April 1965, at which time he was promoted to lieutenant general. He assumed command of the Thirteenth Air Force at Clark Air Base in the Republic of the Philippines in August 1967.

Davis was assigned as deputy commander in chief, U.S. Strike Command, with headquarters at MacDill Air Force Base, Florida, in August 1968, with additional duty as commander in chief, Middle-East, Southern Asia and Africa. He retired from active military service on February 1, 1970.

After his retirement from the United States Air Force, General Davis became Cleveland's public safety director, from February 1970, appointed by Mayor Carl Stokes. He resigned in July 1970, not feeling that Stokes was supporting him sufficiently, and that "enemies of law enforcement" were receiving support from within Stokes' administration.

On December 9, 1998, Davis Jr. was promoted to general, U.S. Air Force (retired), with President Bill Clinton pinning on his four-star insignia. In the late 1980s he began to work on his autobiography, Benjamin O. Davis Jr.: American: An Autobiography.

== Creator of the median line on Taiwan Strait ==
Historically, both the People's Republic of China (PRC) and the Republic of China (ROC) on Taiwan espoused a One-China Policy that considered the strait part of the exclusive economic zone of a single "China". In practice, a maritime border of control exists along the median line down the strait. In 1955, Davis defined this median line by drawing a line down the middle of the strait. The US then pressured both sides into entering into a tacit agreement not to cross the median line.

== Dates of rank ==
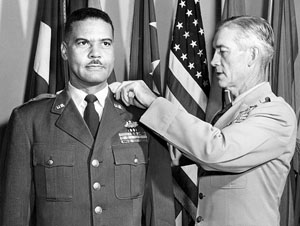
General Earle E. Partridge pinning a general's star on Davis.

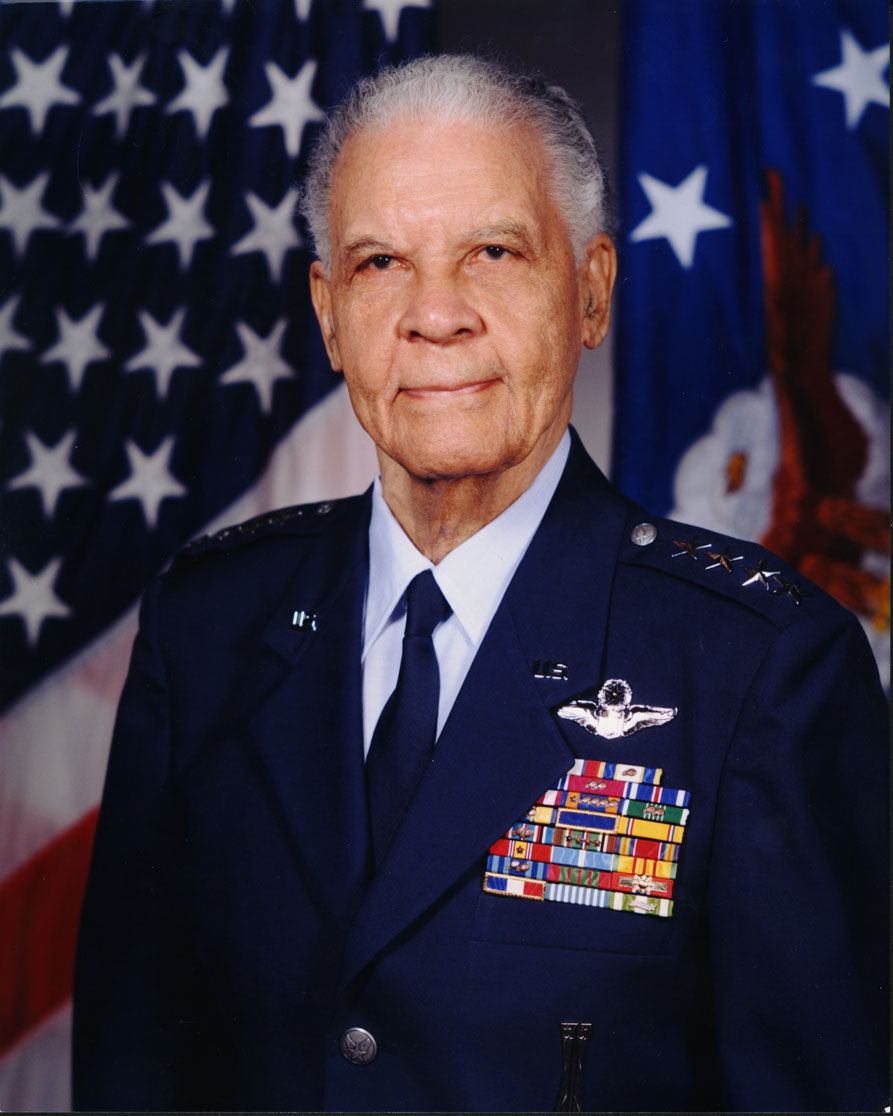
Portrait of General Davis shortly after receiving his fourth star.

General Davis' effective dates of promotion are:

Second Lieutenant, June 12, 1936
First Lieutenant, June 19, 1939
Captain, October 9, 1940 (temporary); June 12, 1946 (permanent)
Major, May 13, 1942 (temporary);
Lieutenant colonel, May 29, 1942 (temporary); July 2, 1948 (permanent)
Colonel, May 29, 1944 (temporary); July 27, 1950 (permanent)
Brigadier General, October 27, 1954 (temporary); May 16, 1960 (permanent)
Major General, June 30, 1959 (temporary); January 30, 1962 (permanent)
Lieutenant General, April 30, 1965 (retired February 1, 1970)
General, December 9, 1998 (retired list)

== Decorations and honors ==
At the time of Davis's retirement, he held the rank of lieutenant general, but on December 9, 1998, President Bill Clinton awarded him a fourth star, raising him to the rank of full general. After retirement, he headed the federal sky marshal program, and in 1971 was named Assistant Secretary of Transportation for Environment, Safety, and Consumer Affairs. Overseeing the development of airport security and highway safety, Davis was one of the chief proponents of the 55 mile per hour speed limit enacted nationwide by the U.S. government in 1974 to save gasoline and lives. He retired from the Department of Transportation in 1975, and in 1978 served on the American Battle Monuments Commission, on which his father had served decades before. In 1991, he published his autobiography, Benjamin O. Davis Jr.: American (Smithsonian Institution Press). He is a 1992 recipient of the Langley Gold Medal from the Smithsonian Institution.

=== Military decorations ===
His military decorations included:

USAF Command Pilot
Air Force Distinguished Service Medal with bronze oak leaf cluster
Army Distinguished Service Medal	Silver Star	Legion of Merit with two bronze oak leaf clusters
Distinguished Flying Cross	Meritorious Service Medal	Air Medal with four bronze oak leaf clusters
Air Force Commendation Medal with bronze oak leaf cluster	Army Commendation Medal with two bronze oak leaf clusters	Air Force Presidential Unit Citation
American Defense Service Medal	American Campaign Medal	European–African–Middle Eastern Campaign Medal with four bronze campaign stars
World War II Victory Medal	National Defense Service Medal with service star	Korean Service Medal
Vietnam Service Medal	Air Force Longevity Service Award with silver and bronze oak leaf clusters	French Croix de Guerre with Palm
Philippine Legion of Honor	Knight Grand Cross of the Order of the Crown of Thailand	Philippine Republic Presidential Unit Citation
United Nations Korea Medal	Republic of Korea War Service Medal	Republic of Vietnam Campaign Medal

- 1978 Order of the Sword
- 1992 Langley Gold Medal
- Congressional Gold Medal awarded to the Tuskegee Airmen in 2006
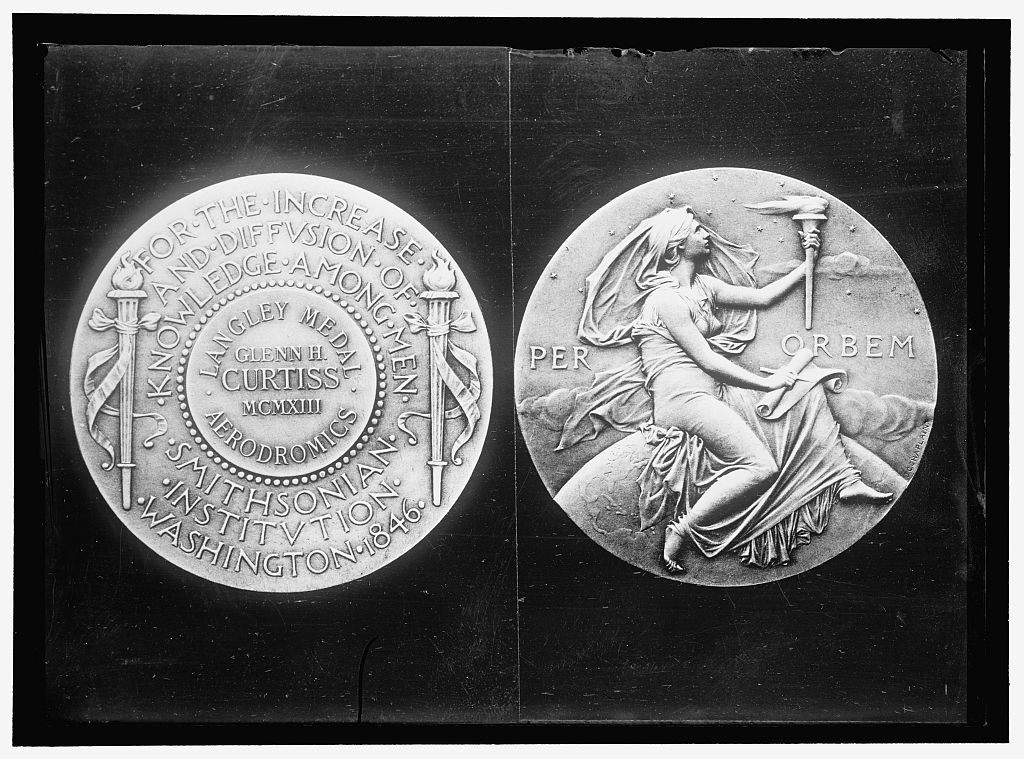
  Face and obverse of the 1913 Langley Medal awarded to Glenn Hammond Curtiss

=== Honors ===
- In 2002, scholar Molefi Kete Asante listed Davis on his list of 100 Greatest African Americans.
- Schools named in his honor include Davis Aerospace Technical High School in Detroit, Michigan; Davis Aerospace and Maritime High School in Cleveland, Ohio; Benjamin O. Davis High School of the Aldine Independent School District near Houston, Texas., and Benjamin O. Davis Middle School in Compton, California.
- The Benjamin O. Davis Jr. Award is presented to senior members of the Civil Air Patrol – United States Air Force Auxiliary who successfully complete the second level of professional development, complete the technical training required for the Leadership Award, and attend Squadron Leadership School, designed "to enhance a senior member's performance at the squadron level and to increase understanding of the basic function of a squadron and how to improve squadron operations."
- In 2015, West Point named a newly constructed barracks after him.
- In 1994, He was inducted into the National Aviation Hall of Fame in Dayton, Ohio.
- He was inducted into the International Air & Space Hall of Fame at the San Diego Air & Space Museum in 1996.
- On November 1, 2019, the airfield at the United States Air Force Academy, in Colorado Springs, Colorado, was renamed Benjamin O. Davis Jr. Airfield.

== Death ==
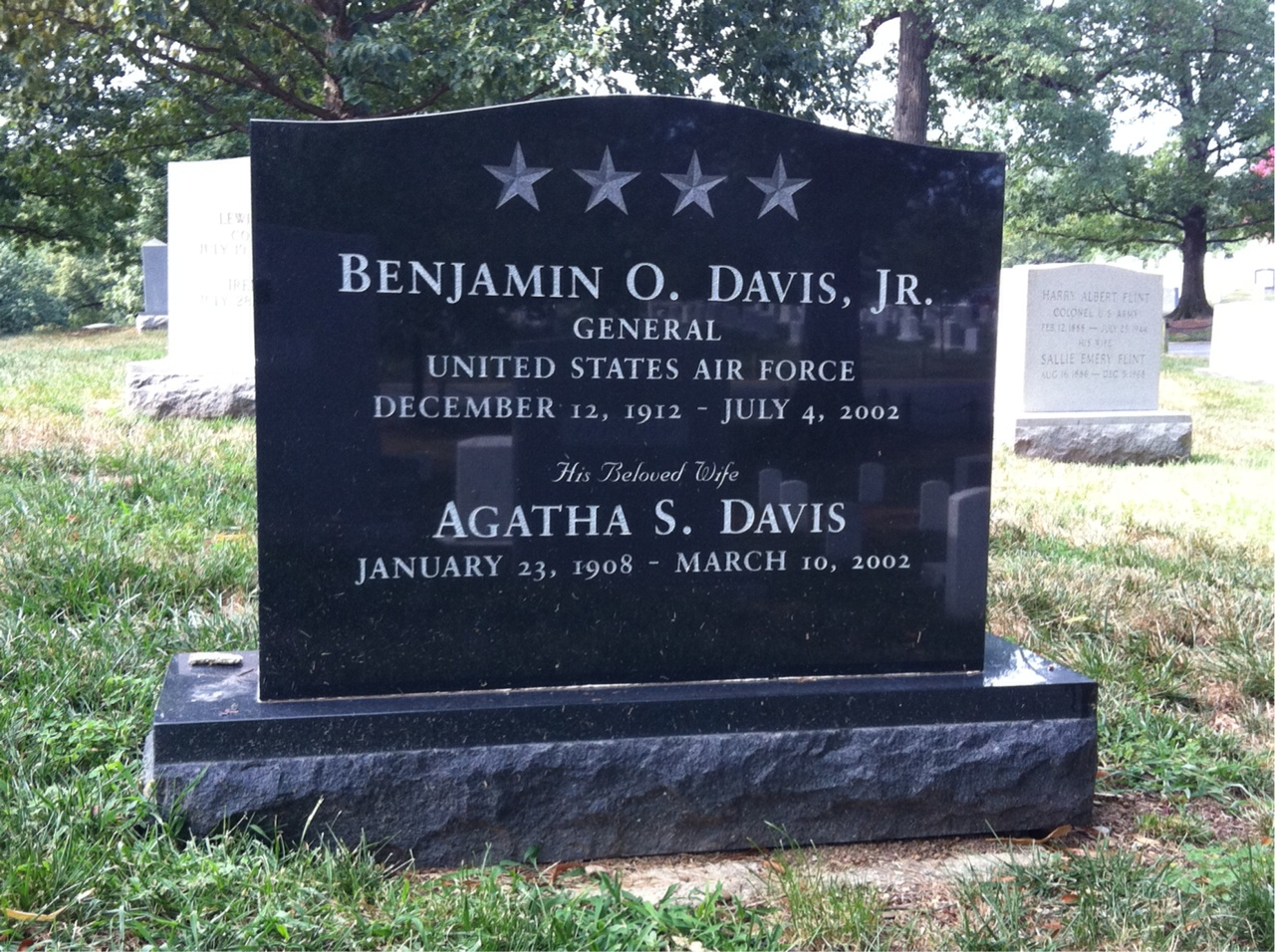
Gravesite

Davis's wife Agatha died on March 10, 2002, aged 94. Davis, who had been suffering from Alzheimer's disease, died at age 89 on July 4, 2002, at Walter Reed Army Medical Center in Washington, D.C. He was interred with Agatha on July 17, at Arlington National Cemetery. A Red Tail P-51 Mustang, similar to the one he had flown in World War II, flew overhead during his funeral service. Bill Clinton said, "General Davis is here today as proof that a person can overcome adversity and discrimination, achieve great things, turn skeptics into believers; and through example and perseverance, one person can bring truly amazing change".

== See also ==
- Davis line
- Executive Order 9981
- List of Tuskegee Airmen
- List of Tuskegee Airmen Cadet Pilot Graduation Classes
- Military history of African Americans
