= Mac Ross =

Tuskegee Airmen pilot (1912–1944)

Captain Mac Ross
- Mac Ross
- Mac Ross
- Born: Mac Ross; June 12, 1912; Selma, Alabama
- Died: July 10, 1944 (aged 32); Provincia di Foggia, Puglia, Italy
- Burial place: Sicily-Rome American Cemetery and Memorial
- Spouse: Abbie (Nee) Voorhies
- Relatives: Father Eddie Samuel * Mother Willie B. Collins Ross *Brothers Eddie, Sammy, Jerry and Arthur Ross, *Sisters Suritha Brooks Geniva Chinn and Willa Morgan
- Military career
- Allegiance: United States of America
- Branch: United States Army Air Force
- Service years: 1941–1944
- Rank: Captain
- Unit: 332nd Fighter Group
- Conflicts: 50 combat missions in the European Theater
- Awards: Congressional Gold Medal

Mac Ross (June 12, 1912 – July 10, 1944) was a U.S. Army Air Force officer and combat fighter pilot during World War II. A member of the Tuskegee Airmen, he commanded the 100th Fighter Squadron and served as the Group Operations Officer for the 332nd Fighter Group.

He was one of the first five African American combat fighter pilots in the United States military, (Note: Together four other Tuskegee aviation cadet classmates: Lemuel R. Custis, U.S. Air Force General Benjamin O. Davis Jr., Charles DeBow, and George S. Roberts. Roberts was actually the first cadet to receive a diploma and wings during the ceremony. He went on throughout the time of combat operations of the 99th Fighter Squadron and later when that squadron was assigned to the 332nd Fighter Group (which already consisted of three squadrons, 100th, 301st, and 302nd), to be the Deputy Commanding Officer and at times when Colonel Davis was away, he served as the Group Commander.) and one of the 1,007 documented Tuskegee Airmen pilots. Being among the first five to graduate, they "drew the most sustained attention from the press and the black community as a result."

== Early life and education ==
Mac Ross was born on June 12, 1912, in rural Dallas County near Selma, Alabama, he was the son of Eddie Samuel "Sam" Ross (1888–1964) and Willie B. Collins Ross (1888–1982). Sam and Willie married in 1911. Ross had eight siblings: Eddie, Sammy, Jerry Ross, Arthur Ross, Suritha, Geniva, Mattie M. Ross (1910–1943), and Willa.

Samuel had two sisters who lived in Dayton, Ohio who urged him for years to move north. In the late 1920s, he moved with his wife and nine children in part because he didn't want his sons to be raised in an environment where they could be lynched. He graduated from Roosevelt High School and then attended West Virginia State University, graduating in 1940 with a degree in mechanical arts. While at University he was a member of Alpha Phi Alpha fraternity. He also worked at the iron works GHR Foundry in Dayton.

On June 3, 1943, Ross married Abbie Voorhies (born August 20, 1915), a U.S. Army lieutenant and member of the United States Army Nurse Corps from Alexandria, Louisiana. She was a night shift nurse at the Tuskgegee airfield where she met Mac, and as of 2019 at age 104 was the oldest living member of the Tuskegee unit.

== Military service ==
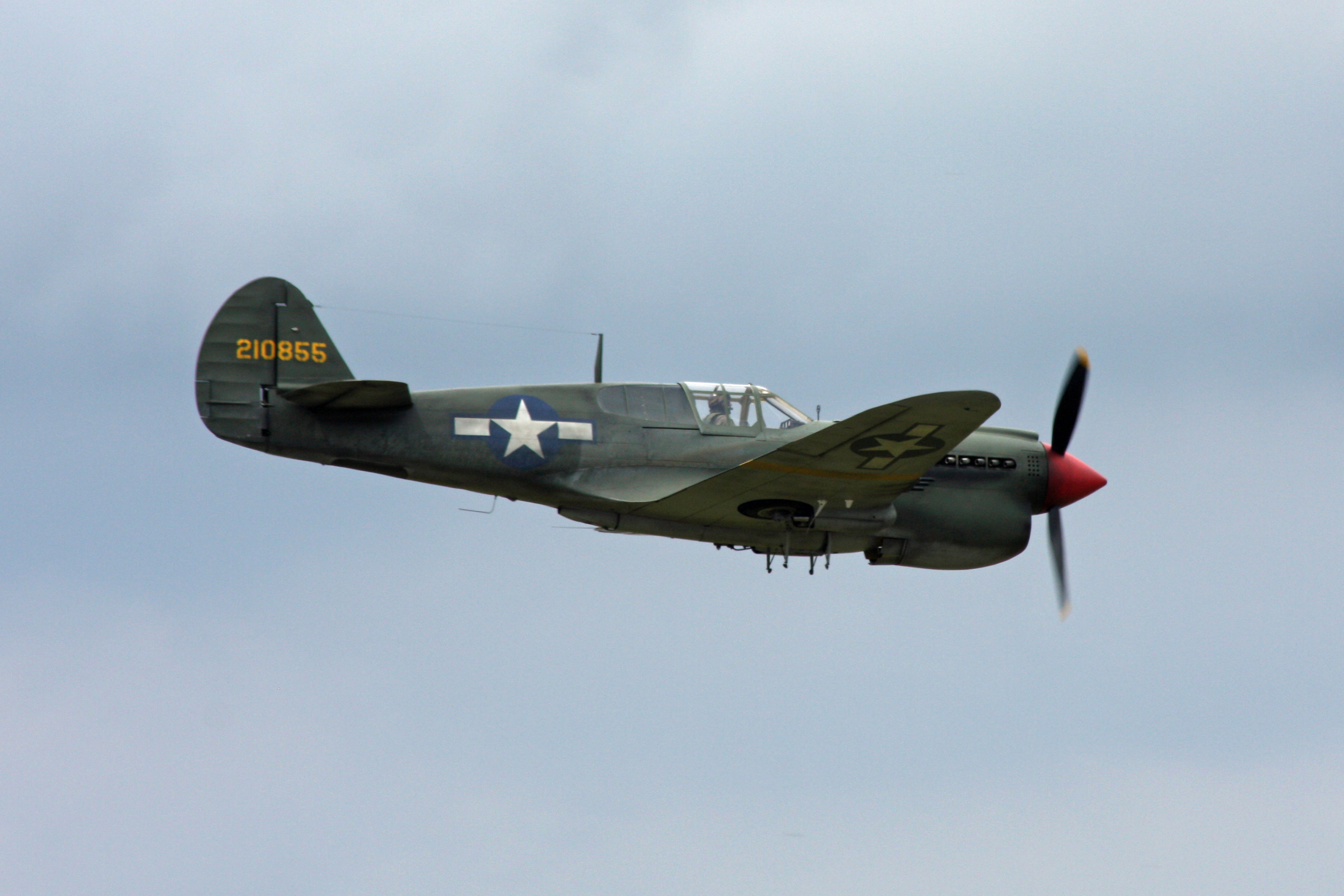
Mac Ross was flying a P-40 when the plane caught fire during training and he had to parachute out. (Note: The Tuskegee Airmen trained with the P-40 aircraft. Later the Tuskegee Airmen became known for flying the P-51 aircraft with red markings that distinguished the Tuskegee Airmen included red bands on the noses of P-51s as well as a red rudder; their P-51B and D Mustangs flew with similar color schemes, with red propeller spinners, yellow wing bands and all-red tail surfaces.)

Ross's alma mater, West Virginia State College (now West Virginia State University) had a Civilian Pilot Training Program (CPTP) created by the Civil Aeronautics Authority (CAA) in 1939 to increase the number of active pilots in America in response to the ongoing war in Europe. It cost $15 a week to attended which was paid by Ross's father. Ross graduated. The college actively competed with Tuskegee and four other historically black colleges and universities to institute a commercial pilot's program for African American CPTP graduates. In the end, the federal government selected Tuskegee Institute as the official commercial pilot program for African Americans pilots. West Virginia State College and the other four historically black colleges and universities would serve as feeder schools.

West Virginia State College officials nominated two alumni for the program: Ross and George S. Roberts, a 1938 West Virginia State College graduate. Ross was admitted into the U.S. Army Air Corps Tuskegee Aviation Cadet training program's inaugural July 19, 1941 class at Tuskegee Army Air Field.

During cadet training, Ross's P-40 caught fire in mid-air and he safely parachuted out; he was concerned it would be called pilot error and provide grounds for critics that black's should not be flyers. He recalled thinking, "I've wrecked a ship worth thousands of dollars. Maybe they'll start saying Negroes can't fly". An investigation found it was mechanical, but Ross always felt he and the others were under intense scrutiny every time they flew. The incident made him the first ever African American member of the Caterpillar Club, an informal association of people who have successfully used a parachute to bail out of a disabled aircraft. His flight instructor Col. C. I. Williams said, "Mac was a good pilot. It takes a special kind of individual to be a good fighter pilot. He was a pilot's pilot."

On March 7, 1942, only five cadets successfully graduated from the program, receiving their wings: 2nd Lt. Ross, Captain Benjamin O. Davis Jr., 2nd Lt. Charles DeBow, 2nd Lt. Lemuel R. Custis, and 2nd Lt. George S. Roberts. Known as Class 42-C-SE, they were the first African-American U.S. Army Air Corps pilots.

On May 26, 1942, Ross was promoted to Squadron Commander of the 332nd Fighter Group's 100th Fighter Squadron, with Lt George Knox and SE-42-A classmate Charles DeBow serving as his adjutants. In July 1942, before embarking for combat, Ross was relieved as Squadron Commander and became the Group Operations Officer. The Operations Officer was considered one of the most important positions requiring experience. On March 27, 1943, his squadron transferred to Selfridge Field in Mt Clemens, Michigan. He commanded the squadron in additional extensive and intensive training at Selfridge and Oscoda Army Air Field.

During World War II, Ross flew over 50 combat missions in the European Theater. While in theater, he was the main pilot of the Group's C-78 light transport aircraft. This assignment limited his combat experience.

== Death ==
On July 10, 1944, Ross died in an aircraft accident. A few days earlier he had been relieved as group operations officer. The reasons for his relief are not clear; according to one source he apparently did not "click well" with his commanding officer, Benjamin O. Davis Jr., while another source states Davis felt experience was essential for an operations officer and replaced Ross with "LT Alfonso W. Davis...a pilot with two years combat experience as operations officer." On the 10th, Ross was checking out a P-51 aircraft near Provincia di Foggia, Puglia, Italy, when his plane went into a slow, shallow descent and hit the side of a hill. The official accident report called it a suicide, though his commanding officer Davis refused to accept it, even threatening the author with disciplinary action if it was not changed, but the report stuck. Little remained physically and some thought it might have been an oxygen system failure ie. hypoxia. One source alleged his mind was not on flying due to being relieved as operations officer. Notably the next day, another Tuskegee Airman with over 116 combat sorties died under similar hypoxia circumstances when his plane nose-dived into the ocean. Ross is interred at the Sicily-Rome American Cemetery and Memorial, Plot J, Row 15, Grave 70, near Nettuno, Città Metropolitana di Roma Capitale, Lazio, Italy.

== Legacy ==
According to author Charles E. Francis, Ross was reticent and one of the most conscientious of his group. He had a quiet confident manner, according to his widow Abbie Voorhies DeVerges, and a positive outlook on life. "He loved people. He seemed like an all around guy," she said.

On June 27, 1989, the U.S. Postal Service dedicated the Mac Ross Memorial Philatelic Room in Dayton, Ohio in honor of Ross. A plaque honoring Ross is displayed at the Dayton Post Office on East 5th Street. He was chosen for the philatelic memorial under the leadership of Postmaster Jack Kincade, who said, "Mac Ross epitomizes everything a young man or woman of today should strive for". James Clanciolo, director of marketing and communication with the U.S. Postal Service, noted Ross's family values and stated that he is a role model for youth.

The University of California Riverside maintains the papers of Ross's wife Abbie. The collection comprises photographs of Ross, Abbie and other Tuskegee Airmen and nurses, Abbie's military separation records, correspondence, news clippings, and items from the dedication of the philatelic room in Dayton.

== Unit assignments ==
- 1941–1942, AAF MOS 770, Aviation Cadet Flight School, Tuskegee AAF
- 1942–1944, AAF MOS 1055, 99th Fighter Squadron, AL, French Morocco, Tunisia, Italy
- 1943–1943, AAF MOS 1055, 33rd Fighter Group, Qued N'ja, French Morocco; Fardjouna, Tunisia
- 1943–1943, AAF MOS 1055, 324th Fighter Group, Fardjouna Airfield
- 1943–1943, AAF MOS 1055, 33rd Fighter Group, Licata, Termini, & Barcellona Airfields, Sicily
- 1943–1944, AAF MOS 1055, 79th Fighter Group, Salsola, Madna, & Capodichino Airfields
- 1944–1944, AAF MOS 1055, 324th Fighter Group, Cercola & Pignataro Airfields
- 1944–1944, AAF MOS 1055, 332nd Fighter Group, Ciampino, Orbetello, & Ramitelli Airfields

== Awards ==
- Distinguished Flying Cross (United States)
- Legion of Merit
- Purple Heart
- Congressional Gold Medal awarded to the Tuskegee Airmen in 2006

== See also ==
- Executive Order 9981
- Fly (2009 play about the 332d Fighter Group)
- List of Tuskegee Airmen
- List of Tuskegee Airmen Cadet Pilot Graduation Classes
- Military history of African Americans
