= Charles DeBow =

American fighter pilot

Lt. Colonel Charles DeBow
- Charles DeBow
- Born: Charles DeBow; February 13, 1918; Indianapolis, Indiana, US
- Died: April 4, 1986 (aged 68); Indianapolis, Indiana, US
- Burial place: Calvary Cemetery, Indianapolis
- Education: Indiana University Hampton Institute
- Spouse: Jane Priscilla Stuart
- Military career
- Allegiance: United States of America
- Branch: United States Army Air Force
- Service years: 1941–1946
- Rank: Lt. Colonel
- Unit: 332nd Fighter Group
- Awards: Congressional Gold Medal

Charles DeBow (February 13, 1918 – April 4, 1986) was an officer in the U.S. Army Air Force and combat fighter pilot and commanding officer of the 332nd Fighter Group's 301st Fighter Squadron, best known as the prodigious, all-African American Tuskegee Airmen. He was one of the 1,007 documented Tuskegee Airmen Pilots.

In July 1941, DeBow entered aviation cadet training with the Tuskegee Airmen's first class of aviation cadets, Class 42-C-SE. On March 6, 1942, DeBow graduated from aviation cadet training with Captain Benjamin O. Davis Jr., future Tuskegee Airmen Commander and future U.S. four-star general; 2nd Lt. George S. Roberts ("Spanky" Roberts, 1918–1984), 2nd Lt. Mac Ross (1912–1944), and 2nd Lt. Lemuel R. Custis (1915–2005). Being among the first five to graduate, they "drew the most sustained attention from the press and the black community as a result."

DeBow was the first Indiana native and the first of fourteen individuals with an Indianapolis, Indiana, address of record to graduate from the Tuskegee Advance Flying School (TAFS).

== Early life, family ==
DeBow was born on February 13, 1918, in Indianapolis, Indiana. He was the son of Charles Henry DeBow (September 17, 1891 - March 1981) of Lebanon, Tennessee, and Anna Sue Horne DeBow (December 25, 1896 - January 1980) of Tennessee. DeBow's parents moved from Tennessee to Indianapolis before DeBow was born.

After graduating from Crispus Attucks High School, DeBow enrolled at Indiana University. Though DeBow's father wanted DeBow to study medicine to ensure a good living in a segregated society, DeBow transferred to Hampton Institute to study business and to enroll in the Civil Pilot training course offered there. After working numerous jobs to save money, Debow dropped out of Hampton University to enlist in the U.S. Army.

DeBow was married to Aurelia Jane Priscilla Stuart DeBow (1926–2017). They had several children. DeBow's son, Captain William DeBow, served as the Commander of the Port Hueneme Division, Naval Surface Warfare Center. Daughter Kay DeBow was a co-founder of the National Black Chamber of Commerce (NBCC).

TAFS Roster of Graduates listed DeBow's hometown address as 2043 Boulevard Place, Indianapolis, Indiana.

== Military career, Tuskegee Airmen ==
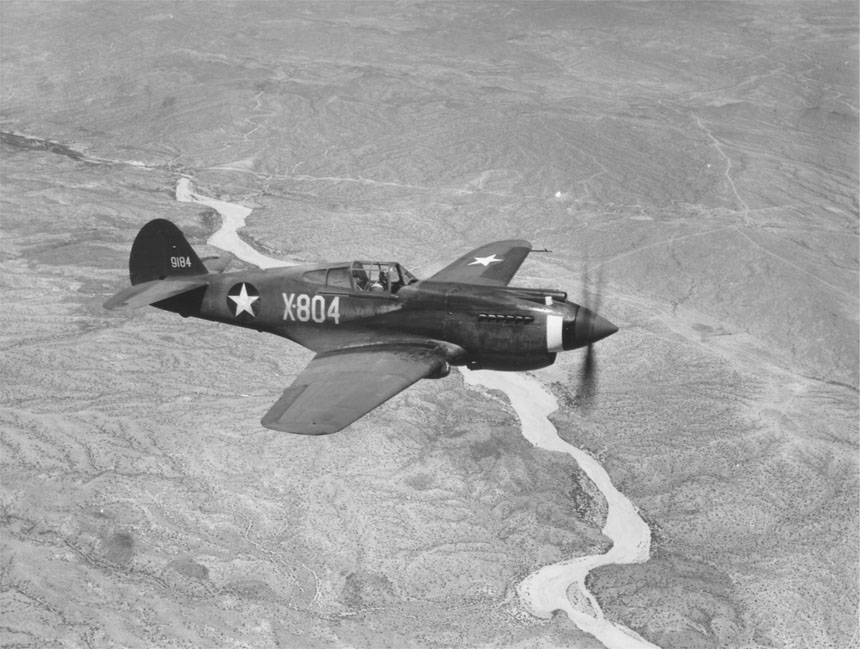
Debow and other Tuskegee Airmen trained with the P-40 aircraft. (Note: The Tuskegee Airmen trained with the P-40 aircraft. Later the Tuskegee Airmen became known for flying the P-51 aircraft with red markings that distinguished the Tuskegee Airmen included red bands on the noses of P-51s as well as a red rudder; their P-51B and D Mustangs flew with similar color schemes, with red propeller spinners, yellow wing bands and all-red tail surfaces.)

On July 19, 1941, DeBow was admitted into the U.S. Army Air Corps Tuskegee Aviation Cadet training program's inaugural class at Tuskegee Army Air Field, Class 42-C-SE.

On March 6, 1942, only DeBow and four other cadets graduated from the program: Captain Benjamin O. Davis Jr., 2nd Lt. Lemuel R. Custis, 2nd Lt. Mac Ross, and 2nd Lt. George S. Roberts ("Spanky" Roberts). Class 42-C-SE created America's first African-American U.S. Army Air Corps pilots.

During World War II, DeBow served as squadron commander of the 332rd fighter group's 301st Fighter Squadron. He flew 52 combat missions in World War II's European Theater including aerial coverage for D-Day's Operation Overlord.

During a mission, DeBow was injured and lost his flight status. DeBow left the military with the rank of Lt. Colonel.

== Awards ==
- Congressional Gold Medal awarded to the Tuskegee Airmen in 2006

== Post-military career, death ==
After leaving the military, DeBow returned to the State of Indiana where earned a master's degree from alma mater Indiana University and another master's degree from Butler University. DeBow became an English teacher at Indianapolis, Indiana's Thomas Carr Howe High School where he remained for 10 years. He later became an associate English lecturer at IUPUI until his death on April 4, 1986.

== See also ==
- Executive Order 9981
- List of Tuskegee Airmen
- List of Tuskegee Airmen Cadet Pilot Graduation Classes
- Military history of African Americans
