= George S. Roberts =

Former commander of the Tuskegee Airmen

George S. "Spanky" Roberts Sr.
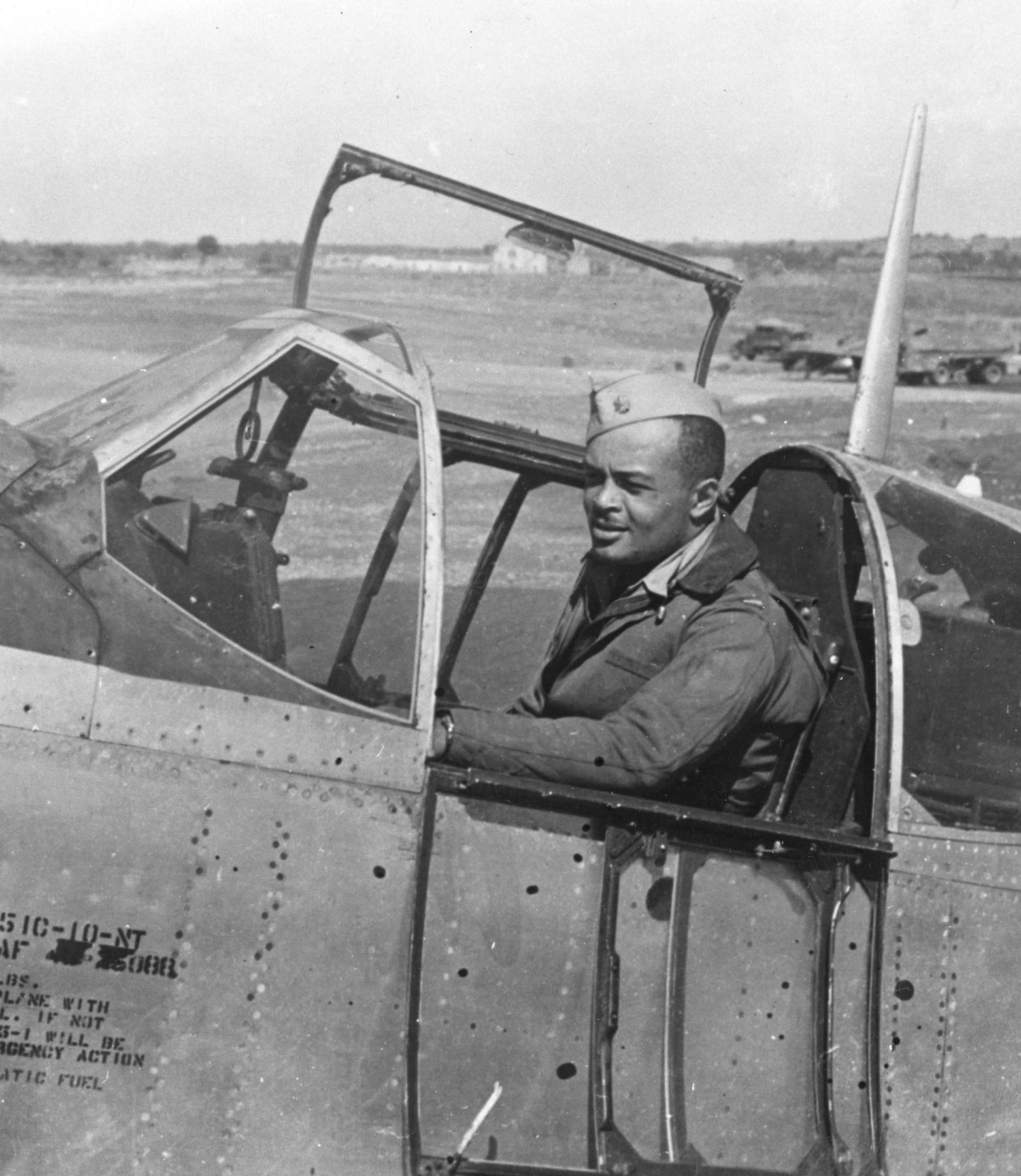
- Roberts at the controls of a P-51 Mustang
- Born: George S. Roberts; September 24, 1918; London, West Virginia, US
- Died: March 8, 1984 (aged 65); Sacramento, California, US
- Burial place: Mount Vernon Memorial Park, Fair Oaks, California
- Education: West Virginia State College now West Virginia State University
- Occupations: Military officer; fighter pilot
- Years active: 1943–1962

George S. "Spanky" Roberts (September 24, 1918 – March 8, 1984) was a U.S. Army Air Force officer and fighter pilot with the 99th Pursuit Squadron (later 99th Fighter Squadron) and the former commander of the 332nd Fighter Group, best known as the Tuskegee Airmen.

Roberts was the one the first five African American US military combat fighter pilots in history and was also the first African-American US military pilot from West Virginia. Being among the first five to graduate, they "drew the most sustained attention from the press and the black community as a result."

Roberts was also the first African American U.S. Air Force officer to command a racially-integrated unit, achieving this historic milestone at Langley Air Force Base in 1950.

== Early life and family ==
Roberts was born on September 24, 1918, in London, West Virginia, Kanawha County. Raised in Fairmont, West Virginia - Marion County, he was the son of Spencer Roberts and Estella Roberts.

In 1934, Roberts graduated from Dunbar School (Fairmont, West Virginia). In 1938, he graduated with a bachelor's degree in mechanical arts from the historically black college and university West Virginia State College (now West Virginia State University).

Roberts married Edith Norle McMillan (1919–2015) literally minutes after his graduation from the Tuskegee aviation cadet training program ceremony. Fellow cadet graduate Mac Ross served as Roberts' best man.

== Military Career, Tuskegee Airmen ==
Prior to attending Tuskegee, Roberts obtained his pilot's license in the Civilian Pilot Training Program. In July 1941, Roberts was the first cadet accepted into the U.S. Army Air Corps' aviation cadet training program with the Tuskegee Airmen's first class of aviation cadets, Class 42-C-SE, on March 7, 1942 Roberts graduated from aviation cadet training with Captain Benjamin O. Davis Jr., future Tuskegee Airmen Commander and future U.S. four-star general; 2nd Lt. Charles DeBow Jr.(Feb 13, 1918 – April 4, 1968); 2nd Lt. Mac Ross (1912-1944), and 2nd Lt. Lemuel R. Custis (1915 – 2005).

During World War II, Roberts was assigned to the 332nd Fighter Group's 99th Fighter Squadron, becoming its first African American commander on June 1, 1942. His squadron served in both North Africa and Italy. He also commanded the entire 332nd Fighter Group before Benjamin O. Davis.

After World War II, Roberts served as the senior Air Corps ROTC instructor at Tuskegee Institute. In 1950, Roberts became the first African American U.S. Air Force officer to command a racially-integrated unit at Langley Air Force Base.

Roberts served during the Korean War, and was stationed in Okinawa. In 1963, Roberts served at Griffiss Air Force Base, managing the U.S. Air Force's ground radar troops. He also served at McClellan Air Force Base. In 1968, Roberts retired from the U.S. Air Force as a Colonel.

Across his entire career, Roberts flew over 100 missions in the Middle East, Africa and Europe.

As a civilian, Roberts worked as a credit officer, training officer, and personal banking officer at Wells Fargo in Sacramento, California. He retired from Wells Fargo in 1982.

== Death ==
Roberts died on March 8, 1984, in Sacramento, California, at the age of 65. He was interred at Mount Vernon Memorial Park in Fair Oaks, California.

== Legacy ==
The memorial bridge in Robert's hometown of Fairmont, West Virginia, was renamed to honor Roberts.

== Awards ==
- Air Force Commendation Medal with four oak clusters
- Two Presidential Citations

== See also ==
- Executive Order 9981
- List of Tuskegee Airmen
- List of Tuskegee Airmen Cadet Pilot Graduation Classes
- Military history of African Americans
