= Lemuel R. Custis =

American fighter pilot (1915–2005)

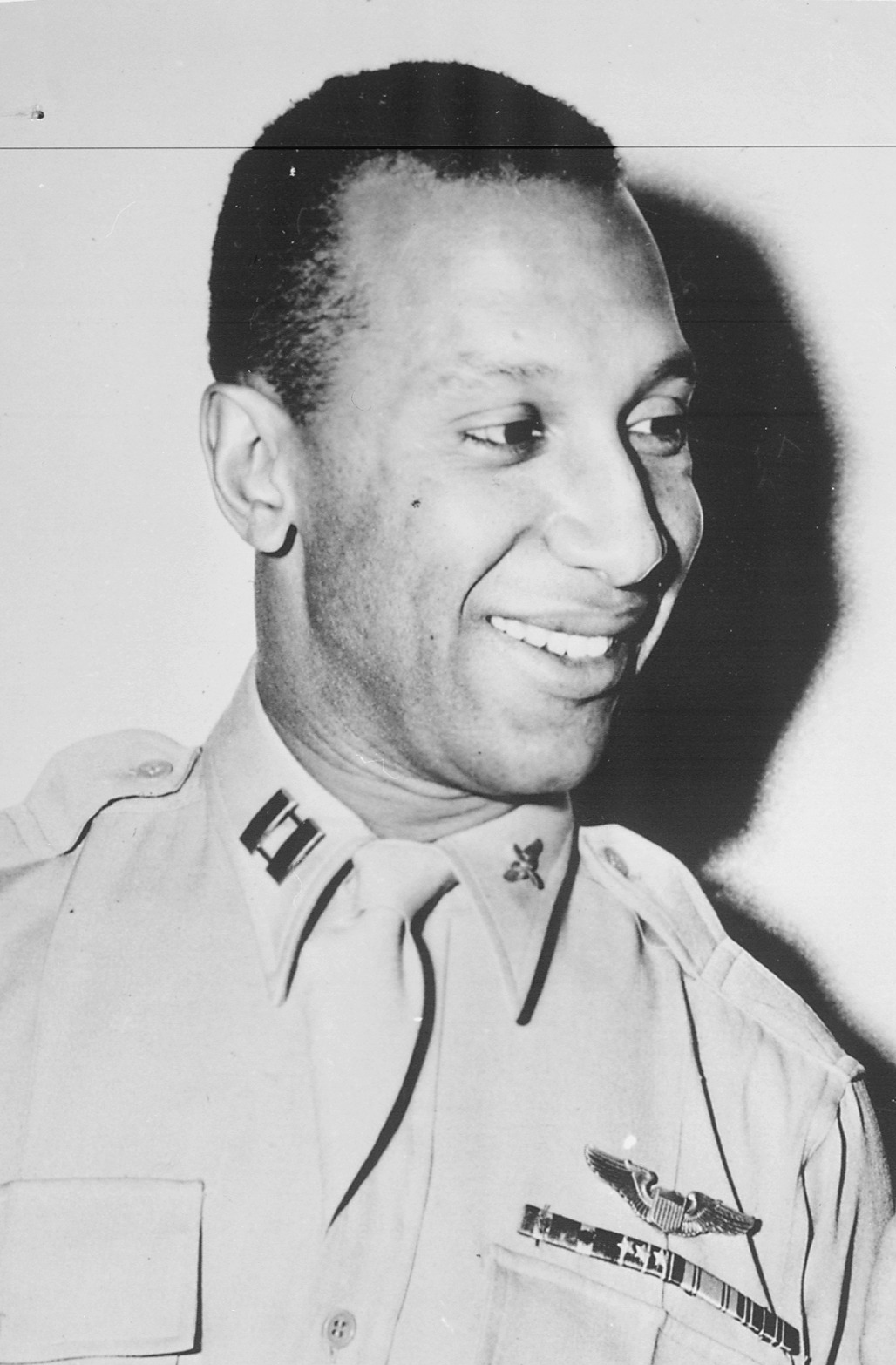
- Born: Lemuel Rodney Custis; June 4, 1915; Hartford, Connecticut, US
- Died: February 24, 2005 (aged 89); West Hartford, Connecticut, US
- Resting place: Cedar Hill Cemetery in Hartford, Connecticut, Hartford County
- Education: Howard University (BSc); University of Connecticut's School of Law (did not finish)
- Occupations: Military officer; fighter pilot; Chief Tax Official
- Years active: 1943–1946

Lemuel Rodney Custis (June 4, 1915 – February 24, 2005) was a U.S. Army Air Force officer, combat fighter pilot and Squadron Operations Officer with the 332nd Fighter Group's 99th Fighter Squadron, best known as the Tuskegee Airmen. He was one of the 1,007 documented Tuskegee Airmen Pilots.

Custis was Hartford, Connecticut's first African American police officer.

Custis was the first African American combat fighter pilot in the US military, sharing this distinction with cadet classmates Captain Benjamin O. Davis Jr., future Tuskegee Airmen Commander and future U.S. four-star general; 2nd Lt. George S. Roberts ("Spanky" Roberts)(September 24, 1918 - March 8, 1984); 2nd Lt. Charles DeBow (Feb 13, 1918 – April 4, 1968); and 2nd Lt. Mac Ross (1912-1944) Being among the first five to graduate, they "drew the most sustained attention from the press and the black community as a result."

Custis was the last surviving member of this original African American US military combat fighter pilots.

== Early life ==
Custis was born June 4, 1915, in Wethersfield, Connecticut, as the only child of Mary C. Goodwin Custis and father Charles Custis (1860–1950). The son of enslaved African Americans from Virginia, Charles Custis moved to Hartford, Connecticut, after the Civil War, becoming a night elevator operator, day elevator operator, and janitor at insurance giant Aetna. Impressed by Charles, Aetna President Morgan Bulkeley offered him a position as a personal assistant. After Bulkeley had died, the successor President, Morgan B. Brainard retained Charles as a personal assistant who would continue in this role until his death at age 90.

Lemuel Custis attended Hartford's public school education, graduating from its high school. In 1938, Custis graduated from Howard University with a Bachelor of Science Degree. In 1939, he returned to Hartford with hopes to obtain employment with one of Hartford's insurance conglomerates. In 1940, Custis became Hartford, Connecticut’s first African-American police officer, serving as a beat officer. After Custis suddenly left the Hartford Police Department, members of Hartford's black community wondered whether the system found a way to rid Custis from the police force. Months later, they were relieved when the Pittsburgh Courier, one of America's most prominent African American newspapers, published an article showing Custis with the inaugural Tuskegee pilot class 42-C-SE graduates on March 6, 1942.

Custis was married to Ione Custis until her death in 1991.

== Military career ==
Custis left the Hartford Police Department to enlist in the U.S. Army Air Corps. On July 19, 1941, Custis was admitted into the U.S. Army Air Corps Tuskegee Aviation Cadet training program's inaugural class which started with thirteen at Tuskegee Army Air Field, Class 42-C-SE.

On March 6, 1942, Custis and three other cadets and one student officer graduated from the program: Captain Benjamin O. Davis Jr., 2nd Lt. Charles DeBow Jr., 2nd Lt. Mac Ross, and 2nd Lt. George S. Roberts ("Spanky" Roberts). Class 42-C-SE created America's first African-American U.S. Army Air Corps pilots. Custis was the last surviving member of the first Tuskegee Airmen aviation cadet class.

Custis served as the 99th Fighter Squadron's Squadron Operations Officer. He flew 92 missions during World War II in the European/ African/Middle Eastern Theater which included North Africa, Sicily and Italy. On January 27, 1944, Custis and his squadron covered the beaches during the Allied's invasion of Anzio, Italy to help liberate Rome, Italy from the Axis, Custis shot down an enemy German Focke-Wulf 190 aircraft, earning Custis an official victory and the prestigious Distinguished Flying Cross. During the battle, Custis's squadron mates shot down five out of 15 German Focke-Wulf 190s without incurring any losses of their own.

The U.S. Army Air Force transferred Custis back to Tuskegee where he served as an advanced flight instructor. In 1946, Custis received an honorable discharge from active duty, retiring with the rank of Major.

== Post-Military Career ==
In 1951, Custis enrolled at the University of Connecticut's School of Law. However, in 1952, he left UConn Law to work with the State of Connecticut Tax Department. In 1975, he became the State's first African American chief of sales tax. In 1982, he retired as the Tax Department's Chief Examiner after a 30-year career. In 1995, he served as a film consultant for HBO's The Tuskegee Airmen.

Custis was a member of the Windsor Locks, Connecticut New England Air Museum's Board of Directors. He also served as an advisor to the Connecticut Aeronautical Historical Association.

In 1996, Custis attended the 25th Annual National Convention of Tuskegee Airmen in Seattle, Washington.

== Honors ==
In 2001, Central Connecticut State University awarded Custis an Honorary Doctorate of Humanities.

== Death ==
Custis died on February 24, 2005, at the Brookview Health Care Center in West Hartford, Connecticut. He was interred at Cedar Hill Cemetery in Hartford, Connecticut, in Hartford County.

== See also ==
- Executive Order 9981
- List of Tuskegee Airmen
- List of Tuskegee Airmen Cadet Pilot Graduation Classes
- Military history of African Americans
