= Knox (surname) =

Surname of Scottish and English origin

- Pronunciation: /nɒks/
- Language: English

Origin
- Languages: Old English, Scottish Gaelic
- Derivation: cnocc or cnoc ("hill")
- Meaning: Topographic or habitational surname referring to a hill

Knox is a surname of Scottish and northern English origin, derived from Gaelic cnoc or Old English cnocc, both meaning "hill". It is a topographic or habitational name, referring to someone who lived by a hill or came from a place named Knock. It has also been adopted as an Americanised form of some Ashkenazic Jewish surnames.

Scottish records contain forms of the name from the thirteenth century, including Cnoc, Knoc and Cnox. Families in Renfrewshire and Aberdeenshire took their names from local places called Knock; no connection between these families is known. The surname is also documented in medieval England and in Ireland, where it became associated with seventeenth-century Scottish settlement. According to Forebears' 2014 estimates, it is most numerous in the United States and most frequent relative to population in Northern Ireland.

== Etymology ==
As a geographical surname, Knox can derive from either Gaelic or Old English. In Scotland, it can come from places named Knock, including one in Renfrewshire, whose names contain Gaelic cnoc, meaning "hill". In Scotland and northern England, it can also derive from a possessive or plural form of Old English cnocc, meaning a rounded hill, either directly or through a place name. The Dictionary of American Family Names notes that these Gaelic and Old English origins cannot readily be distinguished. George Fraser Black likewise interprets the surname's ending as an English plural.

In the United States, Knox also occurs as an Americanised form of similar-sounding eastern Ashkenazic Jewish surnames.

== History ==
The Renfrewshire family took its name from land at Knock, named after a local hillock. Donald Whyte traces the family to Adam, son of Uchtred, who received the land during the reign of Alexander II (1214–1249). A charter witness in Renfrewshire was recorded as John de Cnoc or Knoc around 1260, and a benefactor of Inchcolm Abbey as Hugo Cnox around 1272.

Scottish records continued to use several spellings. In 1328, payment records named Alan del Cnoc or Alan de Knockis; other forms included Knoches (1311), Knokis (1330), Knokkis (1468) and Nox (1570).

A separate family, documented in north-eastern Scotland from the fifteenth century, took its name from Knock in Aberdeenshire. Whyte identifies no connection with the Renfrewshire family. In the parish of Deer, the name appeared as Knows, Knox and Knollis, with Knowles as the later Aberdeen form. One bearer appears in Aberdeen records as John Knowis in 1460 and as John Knollis or Knollys in 1464 and 1475.

In England, Knokes appears in the 1377 poll tax for Carlisle, while Thomas Knok at Westonbirt, Gloucestershire, and Johannes Knoke at Ashford, Derbyshire, are recorded in 1381. Spelling variation persisted into the eighteenth century: the headmaster and writer Vicesimus Knox (1752–1821) signed his name first as Nock and then as Knock until the age of twenty.

The name is documented in Ireland by 1566, when John Knok appears in an administrative record. John Grenham associates the surname with seventeenth-century Scottish settlement and identifies eastern Ulster and south-eastern Ireland as areas where it is numerous. Among the settlers was Andrew Knox (1559–1633), born at Ranfurly in Renfrewshire. Nominated Bishop of Raphoe in 1610 during the Plantation of Ulster, he settled at Raphoe in 1619.

The family later ennobled as earls of Ranfurly descended from Glasgow merchants who settled in Ireland after 1660. Thomas Knox acquired the Dungannon estate in 1692; the earldom was created in 1831. A related branch at Belleek Manor, County Mayo, adopted the compound surname Knox-Gore. James Knox (1774–1818) added Gore under the terms of his maternal grandfather's will. After the end of the male line in 1891, the family name became Saunders Knox Gore.

William Knox of London held fishing premises at Fermeuse, Newfoundland, in 1788 and 1792. Later marriage records include bearers from County Kilkenny, Ireland, in 1811 and Southampton, England, in 1849.

== Frequency and distribution ==
In 1881, 5,102 people in Great Britain bore the surname Knox. It was widespread in Scotland, with Northumberland and Durham also among its principal locations. In Ireland, Grenham's index of Griffith's Valuation, the nineteenth-century property survey, lists 541 households under the spelling Knox. The largest county totals are Antrim (130), Mayo (62) and Tyrone (60).

The 2020 United States census recorded 43,026 people with the surname, ranking it 782nd.

The surname-distribution website Forebears estimated about 85,600 bearers worldwide in 2014. Its estimates placed the largest number in the United States and the highest frequency relative to population in Northern Ireland. Forebears compiles samples from multiple sources and scales them to population totals; it notes that incomplete coverage and uneven samples can affect its estimates and rankings. Its ten largest country totals were:

Estimated distribution of the surname Knox (Forebears, 2014)
Country	Estimated bearers	Frequency
United States	57,984	1 in 6,251
England	7,572	1 in 7,358
Australia	5,084	1 in 5,310
Canada	5,066	1 in 7,273
Scotland	3,302	1 in 1,621
Northern Ireland	1,474	1 in 1,252
South Africa	1,355	1 in 39,984
New Zealand	1,195	1 in 3,789
Republic of Ireland	578	1 in 8,147
Wales	256	1 in 12,088

== Notable people ==
People with the surname, including compound surnames and professional names, include:

=== A–F ===
- Adrian Knox (1863–1932), Australian judge and chief justice of the High Court of Australia
- Alexander Knox (1907–1995), Canadian actor who portrayed Woodrow Wilson in the film Wilson
- Alfred Knox (1870–1964), British army officer and politician
- Amanda Knox (born 1987), American author and journalist
- Andrew Knox (1559–1633), Scottish cleric and bishop of Raphoe
- Angelina J. Knox, American inventor
- Archibald Knox (1864–1933), Manx artist and designer associated with Liberty
- Archie Knox (born 1947), Scottish football manager
- Arthur Edward Knox (1808–1886), British naturalist and author
- Barbara Knox (born 1933), actress known for playing Rita Tanner in Coronation Street
- Belle Knox, stage name of an American adult film actress
- Bernard Knox (1914–2010), classicist and first director of Harvard University's Center for Hellenic Studies
- Bill Knox (1928–1999), Scottish author
- Bronwen Knox (born 1986), Australian Olympic water polo player
- Buddy Knox (1933–1999), American rockabilly singer-songwriter
- Buddy Knox, Australian blues musician
- Cecil Leonard Knox, British army officer and recipient of the Victoria Cross
- Chris Knox (born 1952), New Zealand musician
- Chuck Knox (1932–2018), American football coach
- Daniel Knox, 6th Earl of Ranfurly (1914–1988), British army officer and governor of the Bahamas
- Dawson Knox (born 1996), American football player
- Dilly Knox (1884–1943), British cryptanalyst at Room 40 and Bletchley Park
- Dudley Wright Knox (1877–1960), American naval officer
- E. V. Knox (1881–1971), English poet, satirist and editor of Punch
- Eddie Knox (1937–2026), American politician and mayor of Charlotte, North Carolina
- Edward Knox (1819–1901), Australian sugar refiner, banker and politician
- Edward M. Knox (1842–1916), American Civil War soldier and Medal of Honor recipient
- Elizabeth Knox (born 1959), New Zealand novelist, author of The Vintner's Luck and the Dreamhunter Duet
- Ellis O. Knox (1900–1975), American educator
- Elyse Knox (1917–2012), American actress
- Francis Knox, Irish member of parliament for Philipstown
- Francis Knox-Gore, Irish landowner and baronet
- Frank Knox (1874–1944), American newspaper publisher and secretary of the Navy

=== G–L ===
- George Edward Knox, judge of the Allahabad High Court
- George Hodges Knox (1885–1960), Australian politician
- George Knox (1765–1827), Irish politician
- George L. Knox (1841–1927), American activist, publisher and author
- George L. Knox II (1916–1964), American military aviator and Tuskegee Airman
- George William Knox (1853–1912), American Presbyterian theologian and writer
- George Williams Knox (1838–1894), British army officer
- Harley E. Knox (1899–1956), American politician and mayor of San Diego
- Henry Knox (1750–1806), American Revolutionary War general and first secretary of war under the United States Constitution
- Ike Knox (1887–1969), American football player
- Israel Knox, American writer on philosophy and Jewish culture
- James Knox-Gore (1774–1818), Irish member of parliament for Taghmon
- Janette Hill Knox (1845–1920), American reformer, suffragist, teacher and author
- Jim Knox (1919–1991), New Zealand trade unionist
- John Knox (c. 1514–1572), Scottish religious reformer and historian
- Johnny Knox (born 1986), American football player
- Jon Knox, American drummer, producer and composer
- Katharine McCook Knox (1890–1983), American art historian
- Keith Knox, Scottish footballer
- Keith Knox, Scottish boxer
- Kevin Knox (born 1971), American football player
- Kevin Knox II (born 1999), American basketball player
- Kittie Knox (1874–1900), American cyclist who challenged racial and gender discrimination in nineteenth-century Boston

=== M–Z ===
- Malcolm Knox (born 1966), Australian journalist and author
- Mike Knox, American professional wrestler
- Mona Knox (1929–2008), American model and film actress
- Myra Knox (died 1915), Canadian-born American physician
- Neville Knox (1884–1935), English cricketer
- Northrup R. Knox (1928–1998), American co-founder of the Buffalo Sabres
- Philander C. Knox (1853–1921), American lawyer, senator, attorney general and secretary of state
- Rob Knox (1989–2008), British actor
- Robin Knox-Johnston (born 1939), British sailor
- Ronald Knox (1888–1957), English Catholic priest, author and translator of the Knox Bible
- Rose Knox (1857–1950), American businesswoman
- Russell Knox (born 1985), Scottish golfer
- Sam Knox (1910–1981), American football player
- Seymour H. Knox I (1861–1915), American merchant and businessman
- Seymour H. Knox II (1898–1990), American philanthropist and art patron
- Seymour H. Knox III (1926–1996), American investment executive and co-founder of the Buffalo Sabres
- Shelby Knox, American campaigner for comprehensive sex education, featured in The Education of Shelby Knox
- Simmie Knox (born 1935), American painter
- Steven Knox, English cricketer and former coach of the German national team
- T. M. Knox (1900–1980), British philosopher and principal of the University of St Andrews
- Terence Knox (born 1946), American actor
- Tom Knox, American businessman and politician
- Tom Knox, pseudonym of British writer and journalist Sean Thomas
- Tommy Knox, footballer who played for Darlington in the 1930s
- Trey Knox (born 2001), American football player
- Uchter Knox, 5th Earl of Ranfurly (1856–1933), governor of New Zealand
- Vicesimus Knox (1752–1821), English headmaster, writer and clergyman
- Victor A. Knox (1899–1976), American politician
- W. R. Knox (1861–1933), organist in Adelaide, South Australia
- Wilfred Knox (1886–1950), English Anglican priest and theologian

=== Names shared by several people ===
- Charles Knox, several people
- David Knox, several people
- George Knox, several people
- James Knox, several people
- John Knox, several people
- Robert Knox, several people
- Thomas Knox, several people
- William Knox, several people

== See also ==
- Knox (disambiguation)
- Knox (given name)
- Fort Knox, a United States Army installation named after Henry Knox
