= George Knox =

George Knox may refer to:

- George Knox (MP, died 1827) (1765–1827), Irish member of the United Kingdom parliament
- Sir George Edward Knox (1845–1922), British judge in India
- Sir George Hodges Knox (1885–1960), Australian politician
- George L. Knox (1841–1927), American escaped slave, activist, publisher and author
- George L. Knox II (1916–1964), U.S. Army Air Force officer and Tuskegee airman
- George William Knox (1853–1912), American theologian
- George Williams Knox (1838–1894), British soldier
- George A. Knox, zoologist and namesake of Mount Knox

== See also ==
- Knox (surname)
