= Ellen Collins =

Ellen Collins (December 31, 1828-July 8, 1912) was an American philanthropist and civic reformer. A lifelong resident of New York City, Collins was the grand daughter of printer Isaac Collins and the daughter of Joseph B. Collins, who was President of Mutual Life Insurance Company of New York and The United States Life Insurance Company in the City of New York. Born into wealth and unmarried, in 1861 Collins became a founding member of the Woman's Central Association of Relief, the New York branch of the United States Sanitary Commission. The USSC was established to aid sick and injured U.S. soldiers during the American Civil War. She served alongside other prominent reformers including Louisa Lee Schuyler. After the war, she worked alongside other reformers, including Josephine Shaw Lowell, to support education for the formerly enslaved through the National Freedman's Relief Association, an institution founded to help former slaves.

In 1880, Collins purchased a number of dilapidated housing tenements in Manhattan's Lower East Side. Offering lower rent and better maintenance than other apartments in the slum-like neighborhood, Collins required "cleanliness, order, and sobriety" from tenants. In 1950, the buildings were torn down in favor of the Alfred E. Smith Houses, a public housing development.

In 1971, Collins was listed in the Notable American Women, 1607–1950, a prominent biographical dictionary.
