= William Neilly =

British soldier

William Neilly DCM (1893-1956). Advancing his real age William enlisted in the British army on 25 July 1910.

When as a lance corporal (acting corporal) serving in the 150th Field Company, Corps of Royal Engineers attached to the 36th Ulster Division. The following action took place at Tugny-et-Pont on the Saint-Quentin Canal for which he was awarded the Distinguished Conduct Medal (DCM). This action took place on the second day of the battle of Saint-Quentin, which was part of Operation Michael that began the German spring offensive on 21 March 1918.

On 22 March 1918 when serving at Tugny, Aisne, France. He had charge of the demolition of a railway bridge, and waited under continuous artillery and machine-gun fire until the enemy were actually on the bridge before destroying it. Later, when ordered to demolish another bridge, he sent back his party and waited alone till the enemy were on the opposite bank before firing the charge.

During this action William Neilly led a small team under the command of Second Lieutenant Cecil Leonard Knox, who also led a team. Second Lieutenant Knox was awarded the Victoria Cross for his part.

William Neilly left the army as a Lance Sergeant after the end of World War I in 1918. He remained in the army reserve until he was demobilised on 24 July 1922.

William Neilly died in Newtownards, Northern Ireland, 30 March 1956.

== See also ==
- London Gazette
- Distinguished Conduct Medal Distinguished Conduct Medal
