= Thomas Knox =

Thomas, Tom or Tommy Knox may refer to:

- Thomas Knox (bishop) (died 1627/28), Scottish prelate
- Thomas Knox (died 1728) (c. 1640–1728), Irish MP for Newtonards and Dungannon
- Thomas Knox (footballer) (born 1939), Scottish footballer
- Thomas Francis Knox (1822–1882), Anglo-Irish Roman Catholic priest and author
- Sir Thomas George Knox (1824–1887), Irish soldier and diplomat, consul-general in Siam
- Sir Thomas Malcolm Knox (1900–1980), British philosopher and Principal of St Andrews University
- Thomas P. Knox (1818–1889), American physician, surgeon, abolitionist and teacher
- Thomas W. Knox (1835–1896), journalist, author and world traveler
- Thomas Knox, 1st Viscount Northland (1729–1818), Irish politician
- Thomas Knox, 1st Earl of Ranfurly (1754–1840), Irish peer and politician
- Thomas Knox, 2nd Earl of Ranfurly (1786–1858), Anglo-Irish peer and politician
- Thomas Knox, 3rd Earl of Ranfurly (1816–1858), Irish peer and Member of Parliament
- Tom Knox, American businessman and politician
- Tom Knox (author), pseudonym of British writer and journalist Sean Thomas
- Tommy Knox (1905–1954), English football goalkeeper
