= Charles B. Hall =

American fighter pilot (1920–1971)

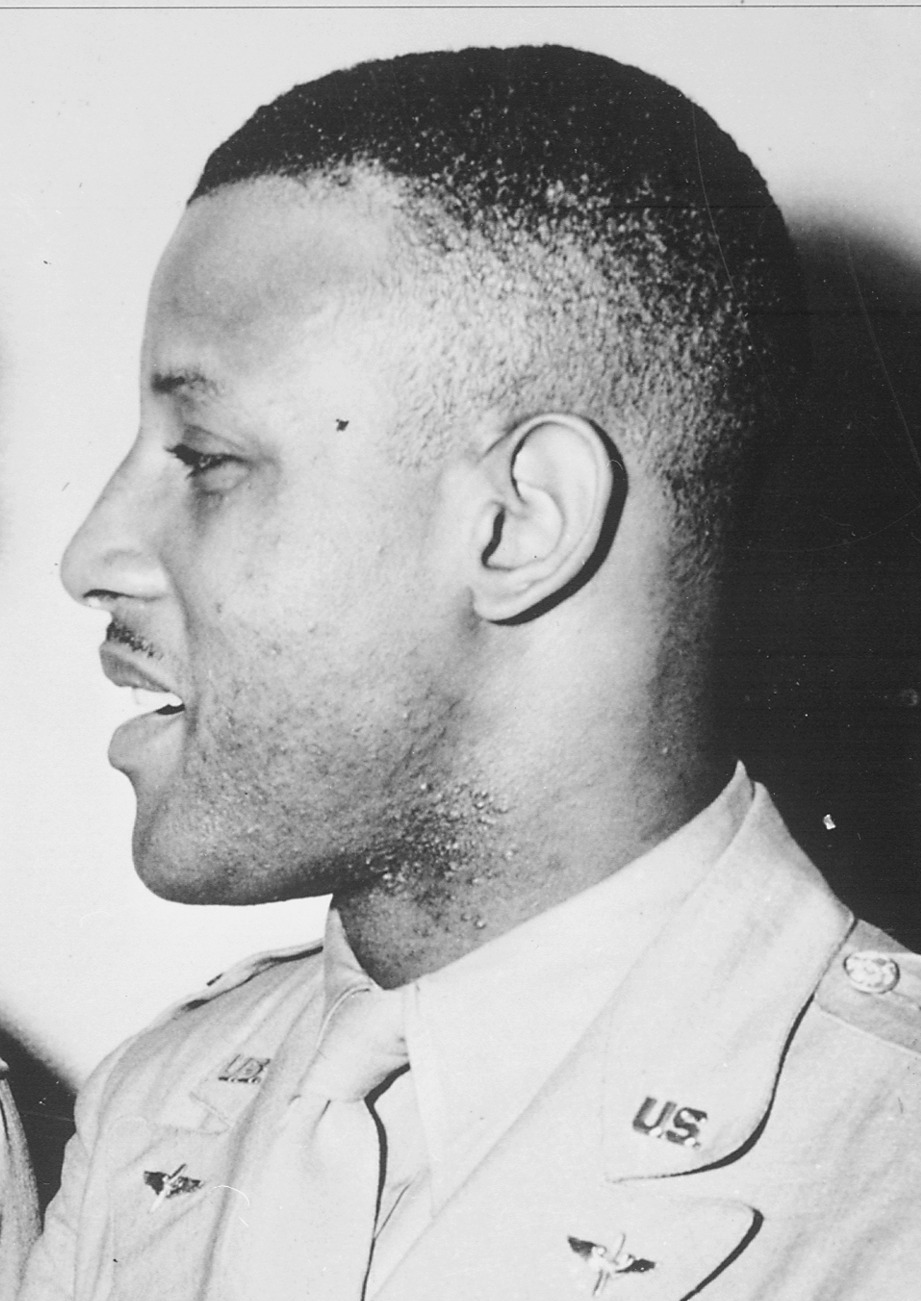
- Born: Charles Blakesly Hall; August 25, 1920; Brazil, Indiana, US
- Died: November 22, 1971 (aged 51); Oklahoma City, Oklahoma, US
- Resting place: Spencer, Oklahoma - Hillcrest Memorial Gardens
- Occupations: Military officer; fighter pilot; rank: Major

Charles Blakesly "Buster" Hall (August 25, 1920 – November 22, 1971) was an American combat fighter pilot and U.S. Army Air Force/U.S. Air Force officer with the 332nd Fighter Group's 99th Fighter Squadron, best known as the Tuskegee Airmen or "Red Tails".

Highly celebrated by the African American press during World War II, Hall became the first African American combat fighter pilot to shoot down enemy aircraft.

General Dwight D. Eisenhower personally met and congratulated Hall on his victory. Hall also became the first African American combat fighter pilot to earn the Distinguished Flying Cross.

== Early life and family ==
Hall was born on August 25, 1920, at his parents' home on 742 N. Columbia Street in rural Brazil, Indiana, Clay County. He was the son of Mississippi native Franklin Hall, a kiln-burner, and Mississippi native Anna Blakesly Hall.

Hall was a 1938 graduate of Brazil High School, where he excelled in academics, football and track and field. Hall attended Eastern Illinois University, majoring in Pre-Medicine. While at Eastern Illinois, Hall participated in sports and worked a job as a waiter.

On December 14, 1942, Hall married stenographer Maxine Jessie Parish Hall in Vigo County, Indiana. There is no documented information on Hall's marriage and probable divorce to Maxine. Hall also married an Emma Jeanne Hall Ackiss. There is no documented information on Hall's marriage and probable divorce to Emma. Hall had a daughter, Peggy Ann Hall-Lofties, born August 9, 1956, in Oklahoma City, Oklahoma, with ex-fiancé Ida Mae Mucker (February 2, 1929- April 24, 1987). The couple's marriage plans were discussed but never took place.

Hall later married Lola Delois Miles Hall (February 18, 1933 - August 7, 1997), an Oklahoma City, Oklahoma, native. Hall and Lola were married until Hall's death. The Halls had one biological child together, Kelli Ann-Hall Jones, born December 1961. and Charles also had one stepdaughter by his wife Lola, Sherri Lynn Hall-Harris from his wife's previous relationship.

== Military career ==
In 1941, Hall enlisted in the U.S. Army Air Corps as an aviation cadet, serial number 0790457, at Lawrence, Indiana's Fort Benjamin Harrison. In 1942 he was assigned to Tuskegee, Alabama, to attend Advanced Flight Cadet Training at the Tuskegee Army Airfield. On July 3, 1942, Hall graduated from the program's fourth Cadet Class Single Engine Section SE-42-F, earning his wings and a commission as a 2nd Lieutenant. He was then assigned to the 332nd Fighter Group's 99th Fighter Squadron. Hall was briefly assigned to the 324th Fighter Group.

During World War II, Hall, nicknamed "Buster", flew 198 missions over North Africa, Italy, the Mediterranean and Europe.

On his eighth mission in the European Theater/Mediterranean Theater on July 2, 1943, Hall and his squadron escorted B-25 medium bombers on a raid on Castelvetrano Airfield in southwestern Sicily, Italy. Flying in a P-40, Hall shot down a German Focke-Wulf Fw 190 Würger. Hall became first African American combat fighter pilot to shoot down an enemy aircraft. After Hall's victory, the 99th Fighter Squadron, in lieu of Champagne, awarded "Buster" Hall the last chilled bottle of Coca-Cola on base at that time. Hall's victory was the 99th Fighter Squadron's sole aerial victory in 1943.

Hall became the first African American fighter pilot to earn the Distinguished Flying Cross. He became an immediate star of the African American press. On July 10, 1943, Pittsburgh Courier war correspondent Edgar T. Rouzeau ran a lead that celebrated Hall's July 2, 1943, aerial victory. The Courier's piece with a massive headline, “99th PILOT DOWNS NAZI PLANE”, featured editorial cartoonist Sam Milai's compelling cartoon depiction of Hall in his flight gear. Other African American publications including the Baltimore-based Afro-American, the Chicago Defender, the New York Amsterdam News, and the Atlanta Daily World ran similar leads highlighting Hall's exploits.

Supreme Allied Commander and General Dwight Eisenhower, visiting troops in North Africa with senior officers including General Jimmy Doolittle and General Carl Spaatz, visited the 99th Fighter Squadron's base to personally congratulate Hall after his victory. Major General John K. Cannon, Commanding General, Twelfth Air Force, also personally congratulated Hall.

On January 27 and 28, 1944 in Anzio, Italy, large formations of German FW 190s raided Anzio. The 99th Squadron downed eleven enemy German aircraft. Now a captain, Hall downed two German FW 190s, raising his aerial victories to three. Hall earned the Distinguished Flying Cross for his valiant achievements.

Hall was one of only nine 332nd Fighter Group pilots with at least three confirmed kills during World War II.

Later in 1944, Hall arrived back in the United States, traveling extensively on an official tour to boost the sale of war bonds. Hall later returned to Tuskegee as a flight instructor. In 1946, Hall left the U.S. Army Air Corps with the rank of Major.

=== Freeman Field Mutiny ===
He was one of ten officers to preside over the Freemen Field Mutiny Courts-Martial, appointed by General Frank O'Driscoll Hunter. They were: Colonel Benjamin O. Davis Jr., Captain George L. Knox II, Captain James T. Wiley, captain John H. Duren, Captain Charles R. Stanton, captain William T. Yates, Captain Elmore M. Kennedy, Captain Fitzroy Newsum, 1st Lieutenant William Robert Ming Jr. and 1st Lieutenant James Y. Carter. Trial Judge Advocates were: Captain James W. Redden and 1st Lieutenant Charles B. Hall.

== Post-military career ==
After leaving the military, Hall moved to Chicago where he worked as an insurance agent. In 1948, Hall moved to Oklahoma where he briefly worked at a drug store and managed a restaurant. Like many African American World War II veteran pilots, Hall could not find substantive jobs with the commercial airlines or commercial transport company based on his race.

In 1949, Hall worked at Tinker Air Force Base until 1967 before landing a role at the Federal Aviation Administration in Oklahoma City, Oklahoma. He later became a well-known insurance agent in Oklahoma City.

== Death ==
Hall died on November 22, 1971, in Oklahoma City at the age of 51. Hall was interred at Spencer, Oklahoma's Hillcrest Memorial Gardens in the Garden of Devotion section, Lot 160, Section B, Grave #3. The local paper made little mention of Hall's history in World War II.

== Legacy ==
- Hall's hometown of Brazil, Indiana, named a street "Charles B Hall Drive" in honor of Hall. The street signs also have a silhouette of a WW2 fighter in honor of his service.
- On July 24, 1994, the USS ALABAMA Battleship Memorial honored Hall for being the first Tuskegee Airman to shoot down a German plane on June 21, 1943. The Memorial also renamed its North AmericanP-51D Mustang |4474216 - USAF for fellow Tuskegee Airman Leon C. Roberts who hailed from the Mobile, Alabama area. Robert's mother, Nellie Roberts, twin brother and former Tuskegee Airmen Cleon Roberts, and sister Imogene Roberts Howard represented Roberts' family at the ceremony. Tuskegee Airman Herbert Carter served as the keynote speaker.
- The 1997 GI Joe Classic Collection Tuskegee Bomber Pilot (WWII Forces Collection GI Joe Limited Edition) featured Hall.
- On June 18, 2002, the Tinker Heritage Airpark was renamed the Major Charles B. Hall Airpark in his honor.
- In August 2009, Hall's hometown of Brazil, Indiana, dedicated a monument to Hall. Its inscription reads:
  Major Charles B. Hall - 08-25-1920 to 11-22-1971 - Brazil native and World War II Hero, Mr. Hall became a member of the Tuskegee Airmen. Mr. Hall was one of the first 43 African American pilots assigned to combat duty with the 99th Pursuit Squadron 332d Fighter Group (the Red Tails). On July 2, 1943 Lt. Hall earned the Distinguished Flying Cross for shooting down a German Focke-Wulf 190 during a mission over [Panelleria, Tunisia, North Africa]. In doing so, he became the first African-American pilot to earn official credit for destroying an enemy airplane in the Second World War. After retiring as a Major in the Air Force, he resided in Oklahoma City until his death in 1971. The airplane above is a replica of the P-40 flown by Major Hall in 1943.
- On November 13, 2015, Charles B. Hall was inducted into the Indiana Veterans Military Hall of Fame, in Indianapolis, IN.https://imvhof.com/2015-class/
- On October 8, 2022, Charles B. Hall was inducted into the Indiana Aviation Hall of Fame, in Carmel, IN. https://inahof.org

== See also ==
- Executive Order 9981
- List of Tuskegee Airmen
- List of Tuskegee Airmen Cadet Pilot Graduation Classes
- Military history of African Americans
