= Edward Knox =

Edward Knox may refer to:

- Edward Knox (Australian politician) (1819–1901), Australian judge and politician
- Edward M. Knox (1842–1916), Union Army soldier in the American Civil War and Medal of Honor recipient
- Eddie Knox (1937–2026), American politician
