= John Knox (disambiguation) =

John Knox (c. 1514–1572) was a Scottish minister, theologian, and writer.

John Knox may also refer to:

== Law ==
- John C. Knox (Pennsylvania judge) (1817–1880), lawyer and state judge
- John C. Knox (New York judge) (1881–1966), United States federal judge
- John Frush Knox (1907–1997), law clerk to U.S. Supreme Court Justice James Clark McReynolds
- John H. Knox, first United Nations special rapporteur on human rights and the environment

== Military ==
- John Knox (British Army officer) (died 1778), served in North America between 1757 and 1760 and notable for the journals he kept during this period
- John Simpson Knox (1828–1897), Scottish soldier and VC recipient
- John J. Knox, U.S. Army major during the American Civil War

== Politics ==
- John Knox (mayor), Lord Mayor of Dublin 1685–1686
- John Knox (1728–1775), member of the Parliament of Ireland for Donegal 1761–68 and Castlebar 1768–74
- John Knox (1740–1791), member of the Parliament of Ireland for Dungannon 1769–76
- John Knox (1758–1800), member of the Parliament of Ireland for Killybegs 1777–83 and Dungannon 1790–94
- John Henry Knox (1788–1872), member of the UK Parliament for Newry
- James Knox (British politician) (John James Knox, 1790–1856), member of the UK Parliament for Dungannon
- John T. Knox (1924–2017), American politician and lawyer

== Sports ==
- John Knox (rugby union) (1880–1964), Scotland rugby union player
- John Knox (cricketer) (1904–1966), Argentine cricketer
- John Knox (footballer) (born 1941), Australian rules footballer
- John Knox (baseball) (born 1948), American baseball infielder
- Johnny Knox (born 1986), American football player

== Others ==
- John Knox (rebel minister) (active 17th c) a non-conforming Scottish minister who founded the John Knox Church and was exiled as a slave to New Jersey
- John Knox (philanthropist) (1720–1790), Scottish bookseller and philanthropist
- John Knox (artist) (1778–1845), Scottish landscape painter who painted a depiction of the Nelson Monument, Glasgow
- John Jay Knox Jr. (1828–1892), American financier
- John Leonard Knox (1925–2015), British High Court judge
- John Knox (chemist) (1928–2018), professor of physical chemistry
- John Knox (meteorologist) (fl. 1980s–2010s), American meteorologist and mathematician, found new method of calculating the mathematical constant e
- John H. Knox (fl. 1980s–2010s), United Nations special rapporteur
- John Knox, a character from Lantana

== See also ==
- Johnny Knoxville (born 1971), American actor
- Jon Knox, American session musician drummer, producer and composer
