= James Knox (disambiguation) =

James Knox (1914–1983) was the Catholic archbishop of Melbourne, 1967–74.

James or Jim Knox may also refer to:

- James Hall Mason Knox (1824–1903), Presbyterian, educator, president of Lafayette College
- James Knox (cyclist) (born 1995), British cyclist
- James Knox (Illinois politician) (1807–1876), U.S. Representative from Illinois
- James Knox (Montana politician) (born 1965), Republican member of the Montana Legislature and politician
- James Knox (British politician) (1790–1856), member of parliament for Dungannon
- James Meldrum Knox (1878–1918), British Army officer
- James Knox, lead singer of The Waltones
- Jim Knox (1919–1991), New Zealand trade unionist and politician
- Jim Knox (American football), Fox Sports American football commentator, see 2000 Oklahoma Sooners football team
- Jim Knox (ice hockey), Canadian ice hockey goaltender, 1966 Memorial Cup champion, brother of Swede Knox
- James Knox Polk (1795–1849), 11th U.S. president
