= William Knox =

William Knox may refer to:

== Australia ==
- William Dunn Knox (1880–1945), Australian artist
- William Knox (Victorian politician) (1850–1913), Australian politician - House
- William Knox (Queensland politician) (1927–2001), Australian state politician - Legislative Assembly

== United Kingdom ==
- William Knox (official) (1732–1810), Irish colonial under-secretary in Great Britain and pamphleteer
- William Knox (Scottish poet) (1789–1825), Scottish poet and journalist
- William Knox D'Arcy (1849–1917), British entrepreneur
- William Knox (footballer, fl. 1927–1934), Scottish professional footballer
- William Knox (footballer, born 1904), Scottish professional footballer
- William Knox (MP) (1826–1900), MP for Dungannon
- William Knox (British Army officer) (1847–1916), British general
- William Knox (bishop) (1762–1831), Bishop of Killaloe and Kilfenora
- William Knox (artist) (1862–1935), British artist of marine paintings and scenes of Venice
- William Knox (cricketer) (1903–1954), Scottish cricketer
- Bill Knox (1928–1999), Scottish author
- Willie Knox (1937–2026), Scottish professional football player and manager

== United States ==
- Frank Knox (William Franklin Knox, 1874–1944), U.S. Secretary of the Navy
- William F. Knox (1885–1975), American football player and coach and lawyer
- William Jacob Knox Jr. (1904–1995), African-American chemist, worked on the Manhattan Project
- William J. Knox (1820–1867), California businessman and politician
- William Lucky Knox (1813–1881), Louisiana politician and plantation owner
- William Shadrach Knox (1843–1914), American congressman from Massachusetts
- William W. Knox (1911–1981), U.S. federal judge
