= Robert Knox =

Robert Knox or Rob Knox may refer to:

- Robert Knox (surgeon) (1791–1862), Scottish surgeon, anatomist and zoologist
- Robert Knox (bishop) (1808–1893), Bishop of Down, Connor and Dromore and Archbishop of Armagh
- Robert Knox (sailor) (1641–1720), English sea captain in the service of the British East India Company
- Robert Knox (private equity investor) (born 1952)
- Robert Knox (fl. 1966), mayor of Berwick-upon-Tweed
- Robert C. Knox (1892–1947), justice of the Arkansas Supreme Court
- Robert Sinclair Knox (1881–c. 1963), British Army officer
- Rob Knox (1989–2008), English actor
- Rob Knox (producer) (born 1980), American record producer and songwriter
