= William Robert Ming =

American lawyer and activist (1911–1973)

Captain William Robert Ming Jr.
- William Robert Ming Jr.
- Born: William Robert Ming Jr. May 7, 1911; Chicago Illinois, US
- Died: June 30, 1973 (aged 62); Chicago Illinois, US
- Burial place: Crown Hill Cemetery, Indianapolis, Indiana, Marion County, Indiana
- Alma mater: University of Chicago
- Spouse: Irvena Ming (m. 1941)
- Military career
- Allegiance: United States of America
- Branch: United States Army United States Army Judge Advocate General's Corps
- Service years: 1941–1945
- Rank: Captain
- Unit: 332nd Fighter Group
- Awards: Congressional Gold Medal
- Other work: Civil rights attorney and law professor

William Robert Ming Jr. (May 7, 1911 – June 30, 1973) was an American lawyer, attorney with the National Association for the Advancement of Colored People (NAACP) and law professor at University of Chicago Law School and Howard University School of Law. He presided over the Freeman Field mutiny courts-martial involving the Tuskegee Airmen. He is best remembered for being a member of the Brown v. Board of Education litigation team and for working on a number of the important cases leading to Brown, the decision in which the United States Supreme Court ruled de jure racial segregation a violation of the Equal Protection Clause of the Fourteenth Amendment of the United States Constitution.

== Early life and education ==
Ming was born on May 7, 1911, to Annie and William Ming Sr., a South Side Chicago municipal employee. Later, he worked as a grocery clerk and on wrecking crews while putting himself through the University of Chicago, and was initiated into the university's Iota chapter of Kappa Alpha Psi fraternity in 1930.

Ming earned a Ph.B. degree in 1931 and his J.D. degree in 1933 from University of Chicago Law School, graduated Order of the Coif, became one of the first African American members of a law review, and was published in the University of Chicago Law Review's inaugural issue.

== Legal career ==
Ming was admitted to the bar in 1933 and subsequently practiced law in both public and private capacities.

=== Military service ===
Ming volunteered and served in the Army's Judge Advocates General Corp, rising to the rank of captain. Prior to serving, in 1941, Ming played a role in the NAACP's unsuccessful opposition to the formation of a segregated U.S. Army Air Corps fighter group for African Americans, a group that would come to be known as the Tuskegee Airmen, supporting an early lawsuit by an African American whose application for pilot training had been denied.

=== Freeman Field Mutiny ===
He was one of ten officers to preside over the Freeman Field mutiny courts-martial. They were appointed by General Frank O'Driscoll Hunter. Colonel Benjamin O. Davis Jr., Captain George L. Knox II, Captain James T. Wiley, captain John H. Duren, Captain Charles R. Stanton, captain William T. Yates, Captain Elmore M. Kennedy, Captain Fitzroy Newsum, 1st Lieutenant William Robert Ming Jr., 1st Lieutenant James Y. Carter. Trial Judge Advocates were: Captain James W. Redden and 1st Lieutenant Charles B. Hall.

=== Litigation ===
Ming was one of the architects of the legal strategy leading to the Supreme Court's landmark decision in Brown v. Board of Education, working on the litigation team for that case and on a number of the important cases leading to Brown, including Shelley v. Kraemer (declaring unconstitutional state enforcement of restrictive racial covenants in housing) and Sweatt v. Painter and McLaurin v. Oklahoma State Regents (declaring unconstitutional separate but equal facilities for black professionals and graduate students in state universities).

Other important decisions Ming played a role in include: NAACP v. Alabama (holding state's demand for NAACP membership lists unconstitutional), Sipuel v. Board of Regents (striking the exclusion of qualified black students from all-white state law schools), Ward v. Texas (holding the use of coerced confessions in murder prosecutions unconstitutional), Missouri ex rel Gaines v. Canada (holding that states that provide a school to white students must provide in-state education to blacks as well), and Virginia State Bar v. S.W. Tucker (Virginia State Bar's attempt to disbar Samuel Wilbert Tucker non-suited/dismissed).

=== King trial ===
In Montgomery, Alabama in May 1960, in front of an all-white jury, Ming helped defend Martin Luther King Jr. on perjury charges related to alleged tax evasion, obtaining an acquittal. A "reluctantly admiring" Alabama lawyer was quoted: "Negro or not, he is a master of the law." King wrote of the trial as a "turning point" in his life and praised Ming and his other principal lawyer, Hubert Thomas Delany: "They brought to the courtroom wisdom, courage, and a highly developed art of advocacy; but most important, they brought the lawyers' indomitable determination to win. After a trial of three days, by the sheer strength of their legal arsenal, they overcame the most vicious Southern taboos festering in a virulent and inflamed atmosphere and they persuaded an all-white jury to accept the word of a Negro over that of white men."

King's wife, Coretta Scott King, would later say of the trial: "A southern jury of twelve white men had acquitted Martin. It was a triumph of justice, a miracle that restored your faith in human good."

=== Organizations ===
In addition to his litigation work, Ming served in leadership and other capacities such as ACLU counsel, National Veterans Organization President, Illinois Commerce Commission attorney, as a member of the Chicago NAACP Branch and the Illinois state Conference of the NAACP and as a member of the NAACP National Board of Directors.

=== Academics ===
Ming was a professor at both Howard University School of Law and University of Chicago Law School, teaching at the latter from 1947 to 1953, where he became the first African American full-time faculty member at a predominantly white law school. Pauli Murray, a student at Howard under Ming, remembered him as discouraging female students as a young professor, commenting on the first day of class, "I don't know why women come to law school anyway".

== Tax evasion and incarceration ==
In 1970, Ming was prosecuted for tax evasion and, despite having paid the back taxes and fines, was sentenced to 16 months in prison. In January 1973, he began to serve his sentence. A number of friends and colleagues urged authorities to grant him parole and release from prison. After a stroke, Ming was paroled and sent to Veteran's Research Hospital in Chicago.

== Death and legacy ==
Ming died in a hospital in Chicago on June 30, 1973.

In his eulogy, colleague Robert L. Tucker noted Ming's "finer and most productive years were spent in the trenches and upon the blood-stained battlefields" of the Civil Rights Movement.

In April 1974, the NAACP National Board of Directors created the William Robert Ming Advocacy Award to be awarded annually to a lawyer "who exemplifies the spirit of financial and personal sacrifice that Mr. Ming displayed in his legal work for the NAACP."
