= James T. Wiley =

Tuskegee Airman (1918–2000)

Colonel James T. Wiley
- James T. Wiley
- Born: James Thomas Wiley; August 2, 1918; Evansville, Indiana, US
- Died: May 3, 2000 (aged 81); Seattle, Washington, US
- Burial place: Non-Cemetery Burial
- Alma mater: University of Pittsburgh
- Spouse: Ruby Ethylynn Wiley
- Relatives: Children Mary and Jim
- Military career
- Allegiance: United States of America
- Branch: United States Army Air Force Started out in the Army Air Corp. Switched over to the Air Force
- Service years: 1942–1965
- Rank: Lieutenant colonel
- Unit: 332nd Fighter Group
- Awards: Congressional Gold Medal
- Other work: USAF plant representative

James Thomas Wiley (August 7, 1918 – May 3, 2000) was a U.S. Army Air Forces/U.S. Air Force officer and combat fighter pilot of the 332nd Fighter Group's 99th Pursuit Squadron, best known as the Tuskegee Airmen or "Red Tails".

One of the United States' military first African American combat fighter pilots, Wiley was the first African American military combat pilot ever to land on foreign soil during combat readiness in North Africa.

== Early life ==
James T. Wiley was born on August 7, 1918, in Evansville, Indiana in Vanderburgh County to James Garfield Wiley (1881–1959) and Allie Lena Stewart (1881—1958) of Mount Vernon, Indiana. The Wileys' children included James T. Wiley, Carolyn Victoria Wiley (1922–2009), Logan William Wiley (1920–2010), Mary Evans Wiley (1915–2012), and William Stewart Wiley (1920–1923).

Though born in Indiana, he was raised in the Hill District of western Pennsylvania. He attended high school in the Pittsburgh Public School system. He attended University of Pittsburgh on scholarship, majoring in Physics and graduating in 1940. Though most of his white physics classmates obtained immediate employment from large corporations, he was only able to secure a job as a chauffeur.

He was married to Ruby Ethylyn Morris Wiley (1919–2008) for 55 years. They had three children: daughter Mary and sons Jim and Bill. At the time of his death in 2000, Wiley and his wife had eight grandchildren.

== Civil pilot training ==
In 1941, he saw local advertising for no-cost, Civil Pilot Training Program flying lessons at the local airfield. He quit his job as a chauffeur and became the only non-white individual admitted among five white students. Weeks later, he graduated from Civil Pilot Training, obtaining his commercial and instructor pilot ratings. After graduation, he and his fellow pilot graduates went to a local restaurant to celebrate. When the restaurant refused to serve him based on his race, all six men immediately departed the restaurant in a show of solidarity.

Though his white civil pilot cohorts were able to secure immediate job offers as pilots, he did not immediately receive an offer until he applied for an opening for a flight instructor at Tuskegee Institute's Civil Pilot Training Program. In the Fall 1941, he joined Tuskegee Institute's Civil Pilot Training Program as a faculty member.

== Military service ==
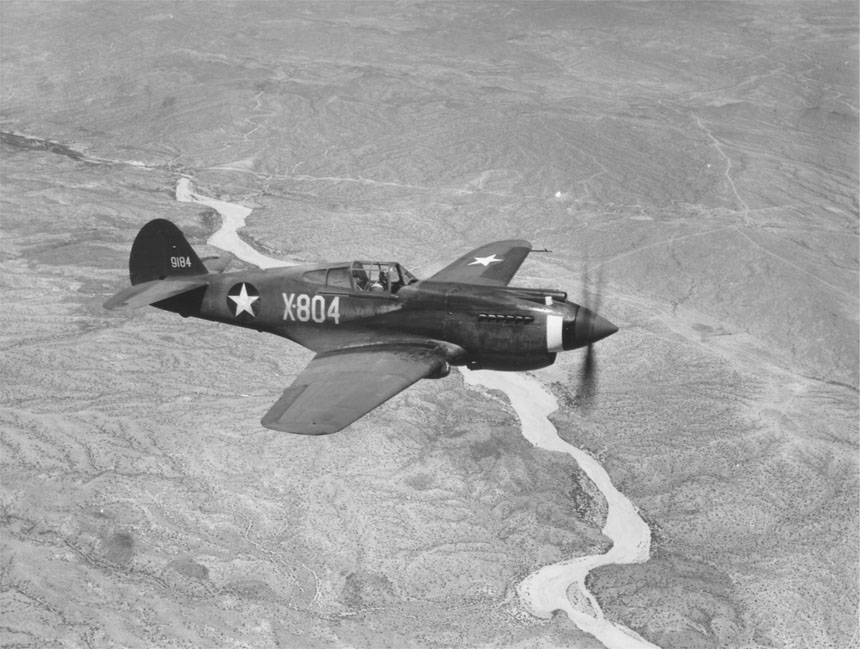
Wiley flew a P-40 and was one of the first two P-40 pilots to land in North Africa, at Oued N’ja in French Morocco. (Note: Later the Tuskegee Airmen became known for flying the P-51 aircraft with red markings that distinguished the Tuskegee Airmen included red bands on the noses of P-51s as well as a red rudder; their P-51B and D Mustangs flew with similar color schemes, with red propeller spinners, yellow wing bands and all-red tail surfaces.)

In 1942, he joined the U.S. Army Air Corps's Advanced Flight Training at the Tuskegee Army Airfield. On July 3, 1942, Wiley graduated from the program's four-ever Cadet Class Single Engine Section SE-42-F, earning his wings and a commission as a 2nd Lieutenant. Wiley's parents attended the graduation ceremonies. He was assigned to the 332nd Fighter Group's 99th Fighter Squadron.

While logging flight training hours at an air field in Tallahassee, Florida without his normal African American ground crew, Wiley crashed his aircraft after a racist white crew person likely affiliated with the Ku Klux Klan tampered and sabotaged his aircraft.

In April 1943, Wiley and his squadron were sent to North Africa in Casablanca. Wiley became the 99th Squadron's flight leader. On May 5, 1943: Wiley and Graham Smith were the 99th Fighter Squadron's first two P-40 pilots to land in North Africa, at Oued N’ja in French Morocco. In late 1943, Wiley and his squadron moved from North Africa to Sicily. After buying a Ducati motorcycle on the island, Wiley crashed into a truck, landing him in the hospital for several days.

As flight leader, Wiley led squadron planes on ground attacks upon a German troop train with 500 enemy soldiers. Wiley destroyed the train's engine and boiler, causing the German soldiers to scurry off the train. Wiley flew 101 combat missions during World War II. In Spring 1944 after his hands had developed a constant tremor, Wiley boarded a ship en route to the United States. When he returned to Pittsburgh, the Pittsburgh Courier and Pittsburgh Mayor, Cornelius D. Scully, declared June 26, 1944 as "Wiley Day". The city paraded Wiley down its Main Street.

After the war he remained in the U.S. Air Force until his retirement as a Colonel in 1965.

=== Freeman Field Mutiny ===
He was one of ten officers to preside over the Freemen Field Mutiny courts-martial. They were appointed by General Frank O'Driscoll Hunter. Colonel Benjamin O. Davis Jr., Captain George L. Knox II, Captain James T. Wiley, captain John H. Duren, Captain Charles R. Stanton, captain William T. Yates, Captain Elmore M. Kennedy, Captain Fitzroy Newsum, 1st Lieutenant William Robert Ming Jr., 1st Lieutenant James Y. Carter Trial Judge Advocates were: Captain James W. Redden and 1st Lieutenant Charles B. Hall.

== Post-Military ==
After leaving the USAF, Wiley became a USAF plant representative and customer engineer at Boeing in Seattle, Washington where he worked on the Lunar Orbiter. When Wiley moved his family into a modest residential neighborhood, his white neighbors began to sell their homes during a wave of white flight.

Wiley was a member of the Queen City Yacht Club. He also enjoyed counseling young people as a volunteer for King County Juvenile Court.

== Death ==
On May 3, 2000, Wiley died from a heart attack at his home in Seattle at the age of 81. His memorial service held at the University Unitarian Church in Seattle was attended by over 400 people and was covered by local TV news media. Wiley was interred in a non-cemetery burial.

== See also ==
- Executive Order 9981
- List of Tuskegee Airmen
- List of Tuskegee Airmen Cadet Pilot Graduation Classes
- Military history of African Americans
