= Charles Knox =

Charles Knox may refer to:

- Charles Knox (composer) (1929–2019), American composer
- Charles B. Knox (died 1908), founder of the Charles B. Knox Gelatine Co., Inc., husband of Rose Knox
- Charles Knox (British Army officer) (1846–1938), Anglo-Irish soldier of the British Army
- Chuck Knox (1932–2018), American football coach
- Sir Charles Knox-Gore, 2nd Baronet (1831–1890) of the Knox-Gore baronets
- Charles Knox (priest) (1770–1825), archdeacon of Armagh
