= Graham Smith (pilot) =

American fighter pilot and Tuskegee Airman (1919–1951)

Graham "Peepsight" Smith
- Born: Graham Smith; April 19, 1919; Ahoskie, North Carolina, US
- Died: April 30, 1951 (aged 32); North Korea
- Resting place: Arlington National Cemetery
- Education: The Negro Agricultural and Technical College of North Carolina (now North Carolina A&T
- Occupations: Military officer; fighter pilot
- Years active: 1942–1951

Graham "Peepsight" Smith (April 19, 1919 – April 30, 1951) † was a U.S. Army Air Force officer and combat fighter pilot with the 332nd Fighter Group's 99th Fighter Squadron, best known as the Tuskegee Airmen. He was a member of Tuskegee Airmen's fourth-ever aviation cadet program and one of the 1,007 documented Tuskegee Airmen Pilots.

Smith was the first African American US Military combat fighter pilot to land on foreign soil in North Africa, at Oued N’ja in French Morocco.

Smith's brother, Reginald V. Smith, also trained as a pilot with the 332nd Fighter Group.

== Early life and family ==
Smith was born on April 19, 1919, in the agricultural community of Ahoskie, North Carolina, Hertford County. He was the son of Dempsey Porter Smith (1885–1976) and Zeora L. Smith (1902–1985). His siblings included sister Mildred Evelyn Smith (1913–1935) and brother, Reginald V. Smith (1925–1946), who graduated from Tuskegee Flight School's Class 45-E-SE as a twin-engine pilot at Tuskegee Air Field, receiving his wings and commission as a flight officer.

Smith attended the Negro Agricultural and Technical College of North Carolina (now North Carolina A&T), where he was the treasurer of NC A&T's Sphinx Club.

On October 30, 1943, Smith married Annie D. Valentine Hall in Weldon, North Carolina.

== Pre-military flight training ==
In its efforts to address the shortage of potential military pilots nationwide (especially with pressure from the African American press, civil rights organizations and colleges for African American participation in aeronautics), the U.S. Federal Government, through the Civilian Pilot Training Program, earmarked six historically black colleges and universities to develop a cadre of African American pilots. The federal government selected the following schools for official CPTP sites: Tuskegee Institute (now Tuskegee University), West Virginia State College (now West Virginia State University), Howard University, Delaware State University, Hampton Institute (now Hampton University) and Smith's alma mater, the Negro Agricultural and Technical College of North Carolina. Smith was one of 20 students selected, out of 100-plus applicants. NC A&T's program required Smith and other candidates to be least a sophomore enrolled an any of the academic programs on campus, and prepared to 72 hours of ground school including aeronautics, avionics and the physics of flight, and 35 to 45 hours of flying time towards a private pilot certificate.

== Military service ==
In 1942, the U.S. Army Air Corps admitted Smith to its Advanced Flight School at Tuskegee Army Airfield. On July 3, 1942, Smith graduated as a member of the Single Engine Section Cadet Class SE-42-F, receiving his wings and commission as a 2nd Lieutenant. He was then assigned to the 332nd Fighter Group's 99th Fighter Squadron where he would operate from 1943 to 1945.

On May 5, 1943, Smith and Lieutenant James T. Wiley were the 99th Fighter Squadron's first two P-40 pilots to land in North Africa, at Oued N’ja in French Morocco.

In 1944, Smith was transferred back to the United States.

After World War II, Smith left the military, returning for the Korean War where he served with the 18th Fighter Bomber Wing and the 12th Fighter Bomber Squadron.

At the time of his death in 1951, Smith held the rank of Captain.

== Death ==
On April 30, 1951, Smith died from multiple fragmentation wounds when his aircraft was shot down by anti-aircraft flak during a combat mission near Miudong, North Korea. After deeming Smith Missing in Action on December 31, 1953, his status was changed to presumed dead.

He was interred at the Arlington National Cemetery, Plot MH, 0, 325-B, in Arlington, Virginia, Arlington County.

== Commendations and awards ==
- Air Medal with 3 Oak Leaf Clusters
- Purple Heart
- Korean Service Medal
- United Nations Service Medal
- National Defense Service Medal
- Republic of Korea War Service Medal

== Legacy ==
- In 2007, the General Assembly of North Carolina passed a resolution honoring the legacy of Smith, his brother Reginald V. Smith, and other Tuskegee Airmen from North Carolina.

== See also ==
- Executive Order 9981
- List of Tuskegee Airmen
- List of Tuskegee Airmen Cadet Pilot Graduation Classes
- Military history of African Americans
