= Cecil Knox =

- Born: 9 May 1889; Nuneaton, England
- Died: 4 February 1943 (aged 53); Nuneaton, England
- Burial place: Gilroes Crematorium, Leicester
- Relatives: Lieutenant Colonel James Meldrum Knox (brother)
- Military career
- Allegiance: United Kingdom
- Branch: British Army; Royal Auxiliary Air Force
- Rank: Major
- Units: Royal Engineers; Home Guard
- Conflicts: First World War; Second World War
- Awards: Victoria Cross

Major Cecil Leonard Knox, VC (9 May 1889 − 4 February 1943) was a British Army officer and a recipient of the Victoria Cross, the highest award for gallantry in the face of the enemy that can be awarded to British and Commonwealth forces.

== Family background ==
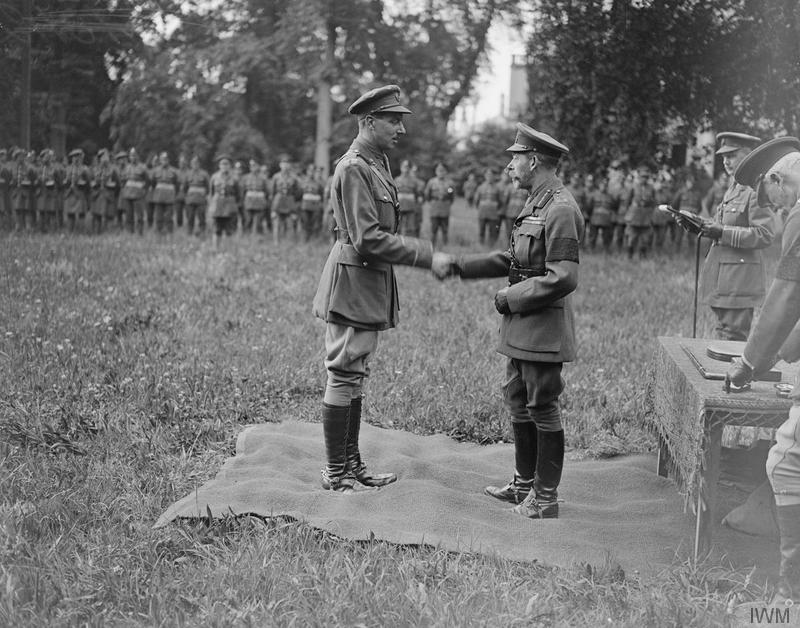
King George V investing Second Lieutenant Cecil Leonard Knox of the 150th Field Company, Royal Engineers with the Victoria Cross at the Second Army Headquarters, Blendecques, 6 August 1918.

Cecil Knox was born in Nuneaton, Warwickshire, on 9 May 1889, the son of James and Florence Knox. The family were prominent in civil and railway engineering and had become affluent through their majority shareholding in the Haunchwood Brick and Tile Company. Cecil was one of nine sons who all fought in the First World War. His brother, Lieutenant Colonel James Meldrum Knox of the Royal Warwickshire Regiment, was awarded the Distinguished Service Order and Bar before being killed in action at the Battle of Asiago (1918), and another brother, Captain Thomas Kenneth Knox, gained the Military Cross and Bar.

== Victoria Cross ==
Educated at Oundle School, Knox was 29 years old and a temporary second lieutenant in the 150th Field Company, Corps of Royal Engineers, British Army during the First World War when the following deed took place for which he was awarded the VC.

On 22 March 1918 at Tugny-et-Pont, Aisne, France, Second Lieutenant Knox was entrusted with the demolition of 12 bridges. He successfully carried out this task, but in the case of one steel girder bridge the time fuse failed to act, and without hesitation he ran to the bridge under heavy fire, and when the enemy were actually on it, he tore away the time fuse and lit the instantaneous fuse, to do which he had to get under the bridge. As a practical civil engineer, Second Lieutenant Knox undoubtedly realised the grave risk he took in doing this.

Between the wars Knox joined the Royal Auxiliary Air Force and suffered from a serious parachute accident. He joined the Home Guard at the beginning of the Second World War and achieved the rank of major. He died as the result of a motoring accident (his motorcycle having skidded on an icy road).

== See also ==
- William Neilly

== Bibliography ==
- Monuments to Courage (David Harvey, 1999)
- Buzzell, Nora, ed. (1997). The Register of the Victoria Cross. Cheltenham, Gloucestershire: This England Alma House. ISBN 0-906324-27-0.
- Napier, Gerald (1998). The Sapper VCs: The Story of Valour in the Royal Engineers and Its Associated Corps. The Stationery Office. ISBN 978-0117728356.
- Gliddon, Gerald (2013) [2004]. Spring Offensive 1918. VCs of the First World War. Stroud, Gloucestershire: The History Press. ISBN 978-0-7524-8730-4.
