= Knox (given name) =

- Gender: Primarily masculine

Origin
- Origin: English, Scottish
- Meaning: round hill

Knox is a primarily masculine given name, a transferred use of a Scottish surname and place name from the Scots Gaelic "cnoc" or Old English cnocc, referring to a small hill with a round top.

== Usage ==
The name increased in usage after Brad Pitt and Angelina Jolie used it for their son in 2008. The name has been among the one thousand most popular names for boys in the United States since 2009 and among the top 250 names for American boys since 2015. It ranked in 200th position for boys in 2022. It has also been in occasional use for girls in that country. According to United States Social Security Administration statistics, 28 newborn American girls and 1,891 newborn American boys were named Knox in 2022. Variants of the name that add the modern suffix ley such as Knoxley are also in use for both boys and girls in the United States. Knoxlee, Knoxleigh, and Knoxli, adding the fashionable modern American lee or leigh or li suffix and sound pattern, are also in use in the United States for girls. Knoxlynn, with the addition of the popular suffix -lynn, is also in use for girls. Variant spellings, adding a fashionable extra x, such as Knoxx are in use. Also in use for American boys are elaborations such as Knoxson and Knoxton and Knoxtyn. It also has associations in the United States with Fort Knox.

== Notable people ==
- Knox (punk musician), stage name of Ian Milroy Carnochan, born 1945, British musician and founding member of the seminal punk band the Vibrators.
- Knox Chandler (born 1958), American session guitarist and cellist.
- Knox Martin (1923-2022), American painter, sculptor, and muralist.
- Knox H. White (born 1954), American mayor for Greenville, South Carolina

== See also ==
- Knox (surname)
