= 15th New York Battery Light Artillery =

15th Independent Battery, New York Volunteer Light Artillery
- Active: December 21, 1861 to February 4, 1865
- Country: United States
- Allegiance: Union
- Branch: Artillery
- Nickname: Hart's Battery
- Equipment: six 3-inch Ordnance Rifle (Note: These were issued when the battery was part of the 2nd Light Artillery Battalion), M1857 12-pounder Napoleons
- Engagements: Battle of Chancellorsville; Battle of Gettysburg; Second Battle of Rappahannock Station; Mine Run Campaign; Battle of Mine Run; Battle of the Wilderness; Battle of Spotsylvania; Battle of Cold Harbor; Siege of Petersburg

Commanders
- Captain: Henry J. McMahon
- Captain: Patrick Hart

The 15th Independent Battery, Volunteer Light Artillery (aka Hart's Battery) was an artillery battery that served in the U.S. Army during the American Civil War.

== Service ==
The battery was formed in December, 1861, as Battery B of the 2nd Battalion, New York Light Artillery, after which it was designated as Battery B of that command. In December, 1861, the battery, then under command of Capt. Henry J, McMahon, was ordered to Washington. It remained there about four months, during which time it received its equipment and was instructed in artillery drill and camp duty. Its armament at the time consisted of six 3-inch rifled guns. In September, 1862, the battery was ordered to Maryland, and stationed at the Relay House. While there its designation was changed to that of the 15th Independent Battery, New York Light Artillery.

Captain McMahon left the service at the end of 1862 and was succeeded in February, 1863, by Capt. Patrick Hart, with whose name the battery subsequently became identified and achieved honorable distinction. Assigned to the Army of the Potomac's (AoP's) Artillery Reserve During the Chancellorsville Campaign, the battery fought in the Second Battle of Fredericksburg, May 1–4, 1863, without sustaining any losses.

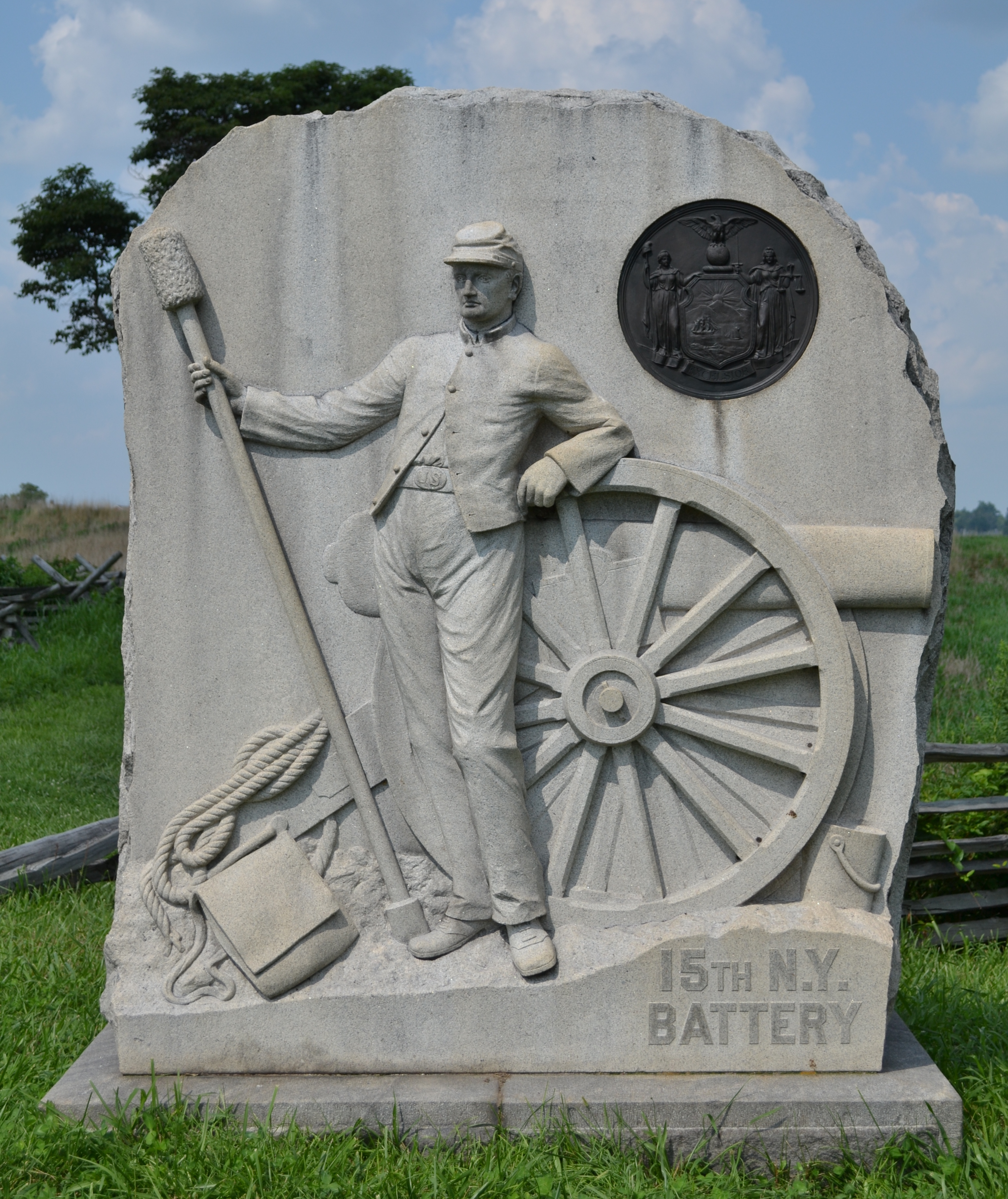
A memorial to the battery at Gettysburg National Military Park

During the Gettysburg campaign, Hart's Battery was attached to Lt. Col. McGilvery's 1st Volunteer Brigade, of the Artillery Reserve. It had been re-equipped with four brass 12-pounder Model 1857 Napoleons. Marching with the Reserve Artillery it left Falmouth, VA, on June 13, and moving northward with the AoP, crossed the Potomac into Maryland, arriving at Frederick City on June 27, halting there two days. On June 30, the brigade arrived at Taneytown, 13 miles from Gettysburg, where it remained encamped during the first day's battle. At daybreak on the morning of July 2, the brigade started for the battlefield, arriving there about 10:30 a. m. The batteries as they arrived were placed in reserve on between the Taneytown Road and Baltimore Pike in rear of III Corps' position. As they waited in reserve, the men of the battery noted that all was quiet along the lines, with no firing to be heard except musketry of distant pickets and, at long intervals, occasional cannon shots.

That changed at 4:00 p. m. when Captain Hart received orders to take the battery to the front and into position on Maj. Gen. Sickles' III Corps line. General Hunt, AoP's Chief of Artillery, placed the battery at 4:30 p. m. in the Peach Orchard along the Wheatfield Road, with the four guns pointed south. From here, they opened on the enemy's artillery, using solid shot and shell with such good effect that one of the opposing batteries was forced to withdraw. Unfortunately for Hart and his men, the Rebels brought up fresh batteries, some of which, having a cross-fire, proved destructive to Hart's men and horses.

At 5:30 pm, Longstreet sent his corps forward and Brig. Gen. Kershaw's South Carolina Brigade attacking the south front of the Peach Orchard. Here, the 15th was in line. Hart ordered shrapnel, soon changed to canister as the enemy infantry closed range. Kershaw's attack was repulsed by the battery's fire. Drawing back, the Rebels formed for a second charge and the 15th stopped them again. During the lull after the second attack, Hart reported to McGilvery that they had exhausted their stock of canister, and had nothing left in the caissons except some solid shot. McGilvery ordered them to withdraw. As they battery began retiring, they found they had only enough horses for three guns. The withdrawal was covered by Lieut. Knox's gun. After they were clear, Knox and his crew drew off his gun by hand, an action that caused him to receive the Medal of Honor on October 18, 1892.

It was in action at this place over two hours. It then limbered to the rear of the main line where it repaired damages, gathered new horses, and replenished the ammunition chests, after which it reported to General Tyler that it was again ready for action.

On July 3, the 15th Battery took part in the grand cannonade which was such a prominent feature of the day's contest. It was posted with the rest of McGilvery's Artillery Brigade at a point in the line about halfway between Cemetery Hill and Little Round Top. When the Confederate infantry advanced, at the close of the artillery fire, the battery assisted in the repulse of Wilcox's and Perry's brigades, using double charges of canister on their ranks. During the artillery fire with which the enemy sought to cover the retreat of their infantry, the 15th New York Battery achieved signal success by exploding two of his caissons and dismounting two guns by well-directed shots aimed by Sergeant Sheehy and Corporal Hammond.

The battery carried 2 officers and 68 men into action at Gettysburg, of whom 16 were killed or wounded, Captain Hart being among the latter. Lieutenant Knox, who was severely wounded, is mentioned in Captain Hart's report as one whose " noble and gallant conduct deserves the highest honor that could be conferred on him." In addition to the casualties among the men, the battery lost 25 horses killed or wounded.

After Gettysburg the battery participated in the fall Bristoe and Mine Run campaigns, notably being present at Rappahannock Station on November 7, 1863, after which it went into winter quarters with the AoP near Culpeper, VA.

Breaking camp early on the morning of May 5, 1864, Captain Hart and his command moved with Grant's army on the Wilderness campaign, during which it was present or engaged in that long series of hard-fought battles. On May 23, 1864, the battery was in action at the North Anna, where it was under fire and several of the men were wounded. It was attached, at this time, to the Artillery Brigade of V Corps, having been transferred from the Reserve Artillery on May 16. At Cold Harbor further losses in killed and wounded were sustained while in the works in front of that place.

During the assault on Petersburg, June 17, 1864, the battery was actively engaged, its guns being run up well to the front and placed within easy canister range of the enemy's earthworks and artillery. Captain Hart and his men received special mention in the official reports for the courage and skill with which they handled their guns on this occasion. In addition to the losses sustained in this action, several men were killed or wounded in the trenches before Petersburg during the long siege that followed this first assault.

On the morning of August 18, 1864, the battery left its camp near the Avery House, in front of Petersburg, and, accompanying the V Corps, moved to a point on the Petersburg Railroad, also called the Petersburg and Weldon Railroad, which led south to Weldon, North Carolina, and connected to the Wilmington and Weldon Railroad which led to the Confederacy's only remaining major port, Wilmington, North Carolina. The Battle of Globe Tavern, also known as the Second Battle of the Weldon Railroad, was the second U.S. Army attempt to cut the Weldon Railroad during the siege of Petersburg. Maj. Gen. Gouverneur K. Warren led a force that destroyed miles of track and withstood strong attacks from Confederate troops under Gen. P.G.T. Beauregard and Lt. Gen. A.P. Hill. Hart's guns went into position near the Blick House, and west of it. Later in the day the pieces were placed about twenty rods farther west. The battle opened on the next day about 3:00 p.m., the Confederates attacking vigorously in order to drive the V Corps from its position. In this fight, Hart's Battery, with others of the Artillery Brigade, assisted materially in checking the advance of the enemy.

But the battle was not over. On the next day, August 20, the artillerymen busied themselves in throwing up earthworks in front of the guns, putting down platforms, and strengthening their position generally. The enemy renewed the attack on August 21, but were again repulsed, the artillery taking a prominent part in the fighting. At no battle in the Virginia campaigns of 1864 was artillery used so effectively as at Globe Tavern. The 15th New York Battery did its share, as is evident from the official reports. Colonel Wainwright, commander of the Artillery Brigade, V Corps, says in his report: " The advanced position held by Hart's and Mink's Batteries, especially the former, afforded these commanders greater opportunities to display their promptness in changing front, while they were also more exposed than others. The manner in which they handled their guns is worthy of the highest praise." It was the first Union victory in the Richmond–Petersburg Campaign. It forced the Confederates to carry their supplies 30 miles (48 km) by wagon to bypass the new Union lines that were extended farther to the south and west. In the battle at the Weldon Railroad the Hart's Battery lost 11 men killed or wounded; a severe loss, as it only had 4 guns at this time.

Three months later, in November, the battery was ordered to Washington, where it remained for a short time in the defenses of that city. During this period it was attached to XXII Corps. In December it moved to Harper's Ferry, where it was consolidated, February 4, 1865, with " Kusserow's Battery,"— the 32nd New York Independent Battery — Captain Hart being retained in command. The 32nd Battery, still under command of Captain Hart, was mustered out of service July 14, 1865, at New York City.

== Affiliations, battle honors, detailed service, and casualties ==
=== Organizational affiliation ===
Attached to:

- VIII Corps, Middle Department, October, 1862, to January, 1863
- Artillery Reserve, Army of the Potomac (AoP), to May, 1863.
- 1st Volunteer Brigade, Artillery Reserve, AoP, to August, 1863.
- 4th Volunteer Brigade, Artillery Reserve, AoP, to August, 1863.
- 3rd Volunteer Brigade, Artillery Reserve, AoP, to December, 1863.
- 2nd Brigade, Artillery Reserve, AoP, to May 16, 1864.
- Artillery Brigade, V Corps, AoP, to December, 1864.
- XXII Corps, AoP, December, 1864.
- Reserve Division, Dept. of West Virginia, to February, 1865.
- Transferred to 32nd New York Independent Battery Light Artillery February 4, 1865.

=== List of battles ===
The official list of battles in which the regiment bore a part:

- Battle of Chancellorsville
- Battle of Gettysburg
- Second Battle of Rappahannock Station
- Mine Run Campaign
- Battle of Mine Run
- Battle of the Wilderness
- Battle of Spotsylvania
- Battle of Cold Harbor
- Siege of Petersburg
- Battle of Globe Tavern

=== Detailed service ===
==== 1862 ====
- Duty at Relay House, Md., October, 1862, to January, 1863

==== 1863 ====
- Chancellorsville Campaign April 27 – May 6
- Battle of Chancellorsville May 1–5.
- Battle of Gettysburg, Pa., July 1–3.
- On line of the Rappahannock till October.
- Bristoe Campaign October 9–22.
- Advance to line of the Rappahannock November 7–8.
- Rappahannock Station November 7.
- Mine Run Campaign November 26-December 2

==== 1864 ====
- Rapidan Campaign May 3June 15, 1864.
- Battle of the Wilderness May 5–7.
- Spottsylvania May 8–12.
- Spottsylvania Court House May 12–21.
- North Anna River May 23–26.
- Jericho Ford May 23.
- On line of the Pamunkey May 26–28.
- Totopotomoy May 28–31.
- Cold Harbor June 1–12.
- Bethesda Church June 1–3.
- Before Petersburg June 16–18.
- Siege of Petersburg June 16 to December, 1864.
- Weldon Railroad August 18–21.
- Poplar Springs Church September 29 – October 2.
- Duty in the Defences of Washington, D. C, December, 1864

==== 1865 ====
- Duty in the Dept. of West Virginia till February, 1865
- Transferred to 32nd New York Independent Battery Light Artillery February 4, 1865.

== Casualties ==
The battery lost a total of 11 men during service; 8 enlisted men killed or mortally wounded, 3 enlisted men died of disease.

== Commanders ==
- Captain Henry J. McMahon – from November 8, 1861, to December 20, 1862
- Captain Patrick Hart – from March 5, 1863, to February 4, 1865

== Armament and equipment ==
The battery was armed with six 3-inch ordnance rifles and commanded by a captain. The battery was further divided into three sections of two guns. Each gun in a section used two six-horse teams; one team pulled a limber that attached to the trail of the gun to form a four-wheeled wagon of sorts; the other pulled a limber that attached to a caisson. Each piece in a section was operated by a gun crew of eight, plus four additional men to handle the horses and equipment. The two guns in a section operated under the control of a lieutenant. The battery also had six supply wagons and a portable forge.

After Chancellorsville, during the Gettysburg Campaign, the ordnance rifles were exchanged for four brass Model 1857 Napoleons.

== See also ==
- List of New York Civil War regiments
- New York in the Civil War
- Edward M. Knox – an officer in the battery who won the Medal of Honor

== Notes/References ==
=== Sources ===
- Dyer, Frederick Henry (1908). A Compendium of the War of the Rebellion (PDF). Des Moines, IA: Dyer Pub. Co. pp. 29. 185, 276, 278. 294, 319, 320, 338, 349, 456, 459, 469, 473. 1399, 1776. ASIN B01BUFJ76Q. This article incorporates text from this source, which is in the public domain.
- Federal Publishing Company (1908). Military Affairs and Regimental Histories of New York, Maryland, West Virginia, And Ohio (PDF). The Union Army: A History of Military Affairs in the Loyal States, 1861–65 – Records of the Regiments in the Union army – Cyclopedia of battles – Memoirs of Commanders and Soldiers. Vol. II. Madison, WI: Federal Publishing Company. p. 221. OCLC 1086145633. This article incorporates text from this source, which is in the public domain.
- Hillhouse, Thomas (January 15, 1862). Adjutant General's Report, 1861 (PDF). Annual Reports of the Adjutant General of the State of New York. Albany, NY: New York (State). Adjutant General's Office. pp. 16, 735. LCCN sn94095328. OCLC 1040003486. This article incorporates text from this source, which is in the public domain.
- Hillhouse, Thomas (January 27, 1863). Adjutant General's Report, 1862 (PDF). Annual Reports of the Adjutant General of the State of New York. Albany, NY: New York (State). Adjutant General's Office. p. 1113. LCCN sn94095328. OCLC 1039942785. This article incorporates text from this source, which is in the public domain.
- Mink, Eric J. (November 30, 2008). "Armament in the Army of the Potomac at Fredericksburg" (PDF). Mysteries & Conundrums. Fredericksburg & Spotsylvania NMP Staff.
- Mink, Eric J. (May 2018). "Armament in the Army of the Potomac During the Chancellorsville Campaign" (PDF). Mysteries & Conundrums. Fredericksburg & Spotsylvania NMP Staff.
- Monuments Commission for the Battlefields of Gettysburg and Chattanooga, New York (State) (1902). Final report on the battlefield of Gettysburg (pdf). Vol. II. Albany, NY: New York Monuments Commission for the Battlefields of Gettysburg, Chattanooga and Antietam/J.B. Lyon Co. pp. 1327–1330. LCCN 00006440. OCLC 5038994. This article incorporates text from this source, which is in the public domain.
- Phisterer, Frederick (1912). Tenth Regiment of Cavalry (Veteran) – Seventh Regiment of Infantry (PDF). New York in the War of Rebellion, 1861–1865. Vol. 2 (3rd ed.). Albany, NY: J. B. Lyon Company, State Printers. pp. 1596–1598. LCCN 14013311. OCLC 1359922. This article incorporates text from this source, which is in the public domain.
- Sprague, John T. (February 1, 1864). Adjutant General's Report, 1863 (PDF). Annual Reports of the Adjutant General of the State of New York. Vol. II. Albany, NY: New York (State). Adjutant General's Office. pp. 17, 541. LCCN sn94095328. OCLC 1039942785. This article incorporates text from this source, which is in the public domain.
- U.S. War Department (1889). Operations in North Carolina, Virginia, West Virginia, Maryland, Pennsylvania, and Department of the East. June 3 – August 3, 1863 – Reports. The War of the Rebellion: A Compilation of the Official Records of the Union and Confederate Armies. Vol. XXVII-XXXIX-I. Washington, DC: U.S. Government Printing Office. pp. 160, 178, 192, 484, 485. hdl:2027/coo.31924077699761. OCLC 857196196. This article incorporates text from this source, which is in the public domain.
- U.S. War Department (1890). Operations in North Carolina, Virginia, West Virginia, Maryland, and Pennsylvania. August 4 – December 31, 1863, – Reports. The War of the Rebellion: A Compilation of the Official Records of the Union and Confederate Armies. Vol. XXIX-XLI-I. Washington, DC: U.S. Government Printing Office. hdl:2027/coo.31924077699886. OCLC 857196196. This article incorporates text from this source, which is in the public domain.
- U.S. War Department (1890). Operations in Southeastern Virginia and North Carolina. August 1-December 31, 1864, Part I – Reports. The War of the Rebellion: A Compilation of the Official Records of the Union and Confederate Armies. Vol. XLII-LIV-I. Washington, DC: U.S. Government Printing Office. hdl:2027/coo.31924077725905. OCLC 857196196. This article incorporates text from this source, which is in the public domain.
- "15th New York Battery". The Civil War in the East. 2016.
- "15th Independent Battery Light Artillery (Veteran) :: New York State Military Museum and Veterans Research Center". New York Division of Military and Naval Affairs. October 10, 2022.
- "15th Independent Battery Light Artillery (Veteran) Roster: New York State Military Museum and Veterans Research Center". New York Division of Military and Naval Affairs. October 10, 2022.
- "15th Independent Battery Light Artillery". The Civil War Archives. American Civil War Archive. 2016.
- "15th Independent Battery, New York Light Artillery". The Civil War (U.S. National Park Service). U.S. National Park Service. 2020.
- "Soldier Details:Knox, Edward M." The Civil War (U.S. National Park Service). U.S. National Park Service.
- "Soldier Details:Knox, Edward M." The Civil War (U.S. National Park Service). U.S. National Park Service.
- "Edward M Knox – U.S. Civil War – U.S. Army – Medal of Honor Recipient". Congressional Medal of Honor Society. CMOHS. 2014.
