= James Meldrum Knox =

Lieutenant-Colonel James Meldrum Knox DSO & Bar
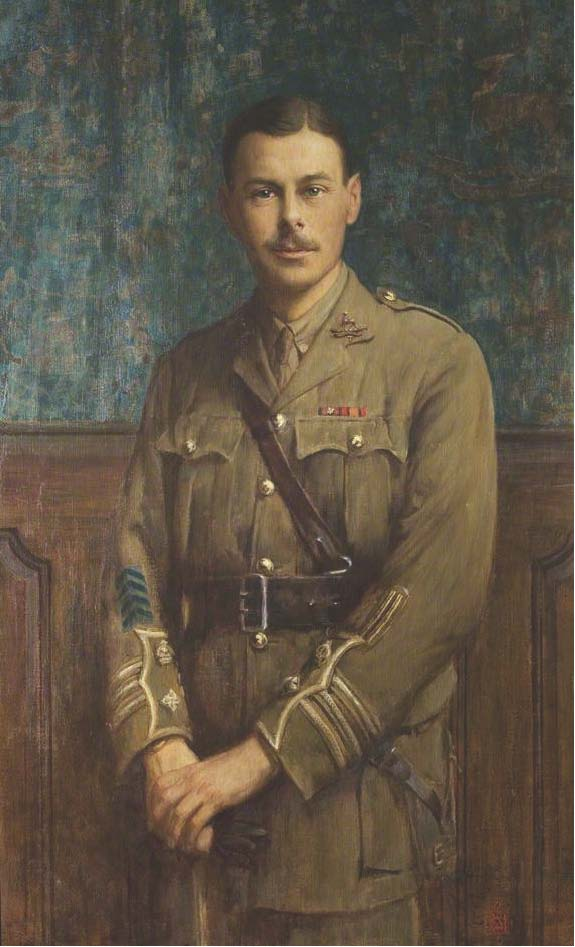
- Lieutenant-Colonel James Meldrum Knox (1878–1918), DSO by Edward S. Harper
- Born: 1878; Nuneaton, England
- Died: 23 September 1918 (aged 39–40); Near Asiago, Italy
- Burial place: Granezza British Cemetery near Vicenza
- Relatives: Major Cecil Knox (brother)
- Military career
- Allegiance: United Kingdom
- Branch: British Army
- Service years: 1899–1918
- Rank: Lieutenant-Colonel
- Commands: 1st/7th Battalion, Royal Warwickshire Regiment
- Conflicts: Second Boer War; First World War; Western Front; Battle of the Somme; Third Battle of Ypres; Italian Front
- Awards: Distinguished Service Order & Bar; Mentioned in Despatches (5)

Lieutenant-Colonel James Meldrum Knox, DSO & Bar (1878 – 23 September 1918) was a British Army officer of the First World War. He commanded the 1st/7th Battalion of the Royal Warwickshire Regiment from 1915 until his death in 1918 on the Italian Front, during the Battle of Asiago.

== Family background ==
James Meldrum Knox was born in Nuneaton, Warwickshire, in 1878, the son of James and Florence Knox. The family were prominent in civil and railway engineering and had become affluent through their majority shareholding in the Haunchwood Brick and Tile Company. James was the first of nine sons who all fought in the First World War. One brother, Cecil, served with the Royal Engineers and was awarded the Victoria Cross while a second, Thomas, gained the Military Cross and Bar.

== Military career ==
Knox was educated at Bedford Modern School. He worked as an engineer at Bristol Docks and was commissioned in the Nuneaton Volunteer Company of the 2nd Volunteer Battalion, the Royal Warwickshire Regiment in 1899. The unit later became the 7th Battalion of the Royal Warwickshire Regiment in 1908. The territorial battalion formed part of the 143rd Brigade, 48th (South Midland) Division. Knox commanded the battalion from 1915 on the Western Front, notably at the Battle of the Somme and the Third Battle of Ypres.

Knox was awarded the Distinguished Service Order (DSO) on 1 January 1917. A Bar to the award was gazetted after his death; the citation in the supplement to the London Gazette of 24 September reads:

Major and Bt. Lt.-Col. (A./Lt.-Col.) James Meldrum Knox, D.S.O., R,. War. Regt. For conspicuous gallantry and devotion to duty in command of his battalion. He kept touch with the situation till ordered by the division to counter-attack when the enemy had broken through. Thanks to his splendid handling of his battalion, this counter-attack was decisive, the enemy were at once held up, and after heavy fighting were driven back with severe losses, several hundred prisoners being captured and the front line restored.

Knox was also mentioned in despatches on five occasions.

== Death and memorials ==
In November 1917, the brigade was transferred to the Italian campaign and saw action at the Montello Front and on the Asiago Plateau. Knox was killed on 23 September 1918. A private in the battalion recorded the news:

23 Sep – Early this morning we received the very bad news that Lieutenant-Colonel Knox, the commanding officer of the battalion had been killed by a shell in his dug-out at headquarters on the San Sisto Road. He had commanded the battalion since 1915 and was a very decent man and respected by everyone. He was not a parade soldier and did not care for drill and show, but was always at hand in the line, knowing no fear but never sending anyone where he wouldn't go himself. He was a capable soldier and had won the D.S.O and bar.

Knox is buried at the Granezza British Cemetery near Vicenza, and there is a memorial to him there. He and his brothers who fought in the war are also commemorated by a memorial at Oaston Road Cemetery, Nuneaton. After his death, Knox's parents commissioned his portrait by the Birmingham artist Edward Samuel Harper. The painting hangs in the Nuneaton Museum and Art Gallery.
