= Fitzroy Newsum =

American fighter pilot (1918–2013)

Colonel Fitzroy Newsum
- Fitzroy Newsum
- Born: Fitzroy Newsum; April 22, 1918; Manhattan New York, US
- Died: January 5, 2013 (aged 94); Denver, Colorado, US
- Burial place: Fort Logan National Cemetery, Denver, Colorado
- Education: University of Maryland
- Spouse: Joan (Nee) Carney
- Relatives: Four children
- Military career
- Allegiance: United States of America
- Branch: United States Army Air Force
- Service years: 1943–1970
- Rank: Colonel
- Nickname: Buck
- Unit: 332nd Fighter Group
- Awards: Congressional Gold Medal awarded to Tuskegee Airmen

Fitzroy "Buck" Newsum (May 22, 1918 – January 5, 2013) was an American military pilot and officer who was one of the original members of the Tuskegee Airmen during World War II. He retired as a colonel in 1970.

== Early life ==
"Buck" Newsum was born on the Upper West Side of Manhattan, New York City, on May 22, 1918. He was raised on the island of Barbados, where he saw his first airplane, a Curtiss Robin, land near his home in 1929 when he was 10 years old.

He graduated from the College of Military Science at the University of Maryland. He joined the New York National Guard in 1939 He was second lieutenant in the Anti-Aircraft Coast Artillery Corps in 1941 and was sent to Hawaii, where he commanded an anti-aircraft missile group on the islands, following the attack on Pearl Harbor. After graduation he served in the New York National Guard.

== Military career ==
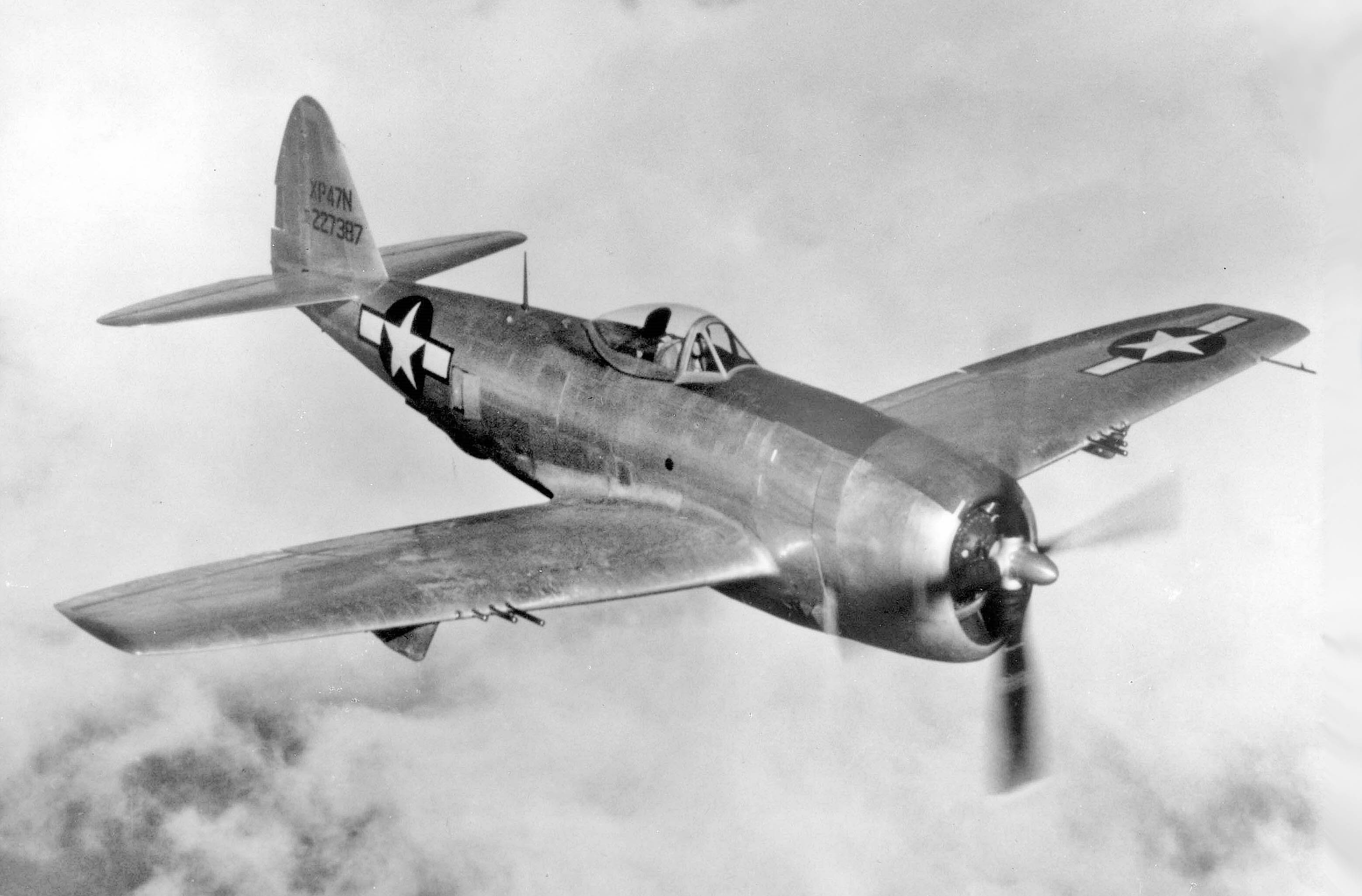
Newsum flew a P-47 during the war. (Note: The Tuskegee Airmen trained with the P-40 aircraft. They also flew the aircraft photographed above, the P-47. Later the Tuskegee Airmen became known for flying the P-51 aircraft with red markings that distinguished the Tuskegee Airmen included red bands on the noses of P-51s as well as a red rudder; their P-51B and D Mustangs flew with similar color schemes, with red propeller spinners, yellow wing bands and all-red tail surfaces.)

During World War II, President Franklin D. Roosevelt arranged for thirty-three African American servicemen to take an entrance exam for the Army Air Corps. Newsum was one of just thirteen men to pass the test. After passing, he chose to attend the Tuskegee Army Air Field's flight school rather than the Officer Candidate School that the other twelve men enrolled in. Newsum would pilot the P-47 Thunderbolt warplane during the war.

=== Freeman Field Mutiny ===
He was one of ten officers to preside over the Freemen Field Mutiny courts-martial. Ten officers presided over the courts-martial. They were appointed by General Frank O'Driscoll Hunter. Colonel Benjamin O. Davis Jr., Captain George L. Knox II, Captain James T. Wiley, captain John H. Duren, Captain Charles R. Stanton, captain William T. Yates, Captain Elmore M. Kennedy, Captain Fitzroy Newsum, 1st Lieutenant William Robert Ming Jr., 1st Lieutenant James Y. Carter Trial Judge Advocates were: Captain James W. Redden and 1st Lieutenant Charles R. Hall.

== Career ==
He later obtained a master's degree in public administration from the University of Oklahoma. He reached the rank of colonel before retiring in 1970. Newsum worked as a public relations manager at Martin Marietta in Denver, Colorado, after leaving the military.

The Tuskegee Airmen were awarded the Congressional Gold Medal in 2006. He was inducted into the Colorado Aviation Hall of Fame in 1991.

== Death ==
Newsum died in Denver, Colorado, on January 5, 2013, at the age of 95. He was buried at Fort Logan National Cemetery with full military honors. Newsum was survived by his wife of sixty-six years, Joan Carney Newsum, four children and four grandchildren. U.S. Senator Mark Udall also paid tribute to Newsum following his death, noting that he proudly served as the U.S. military despite the segregation of the era.

== See also ==
- Dogfights (TV series)
- Executive Order 9981
- Freeman Field Mutiny
- List of Tuskegee Airmen
- Military history of African Americans
- The Tuskegee Airmen (movie)
