= Charles Knox (composer) =

American composer, educator and trombonist

- Born: April 19, 1929; Atlanta, Georgia, U.S.
- Died: December 11, 2019 (aged 90); Atlanta, Georgia, U.S.
- Education: University of Georgia (BFA); Indiana University School of Music (MM, PhD)

Charles C. Knox (April 19, 1929 – December 11, 2019) was an American composer and music educator. He is particularly noted for his music for brass instruments and chamber music, among his over 100 compositions.

Knox received a B.F.A. in music from the University of Georgia, where he joined the Phi Mu Alpha Sinfonia music fraternity (Epsilon Lambda chapter) in 1950 and was later elected to Phi Beta Kappa. He subsequently earned both his Master of Music and Ph.D. from Indiana University School of Music, where he studied composition with Bernhard Heiden.

Knox was professor of music at Georgia State University for over three decades. In 2001 he was recipient of a Mayor's Fellowship in the Arts from the City of Atlanta.

Examples of Knox's chamber works can be found in audio format on two compact discs, Clouds Are Not Spheres (1997, Albany Records #254) and 2002: Chamber Music of Charles Knox (2000, ACA Digital #ACD 20066).

== Selected works ==
- Music for Brass Quintet (1953, revised 1967)
- Symphony for band (1955)
- Concert Piece for bassoon and orchestra (1959)
- Suite for piano 4-hands (1959)
- A Dedication Litany for mixed chorus a cappella (1960)
- Solo for trumpet with brass trio (1966)
- Solo for tuba with brass trio (1969)
- Sonatina for piano (1969)
- Sing We to Our God Above for chorus and organ (1970)
- Festival Procession for chorus, brass quartet and organ (1972)
- Symphony for brass and percussion (1974)
- Music for Brass Quintet and Piano (1983)
- Rounds About for violin, clarinet, trombone and percussion (1983)
- Song and Double for oboe and piano (1984)
- Quintet for Woodwinds (1989)
- Music for Viola and Percussion (1989)
- Visible Canon for 4 keyboard percussionists (1990)
- His Praises We'll Sing for treble chorus and organ (1991, later arranged for mixed voices)
- Semordnilap for voice, flute, marimba and piano (1991)
- Tau of "n" for flute, clarinet, vibraphone, cello and piano (1992)
- Scherzos for horn, violin and piano (1993)
- Wings for Our Soul for violin and piano (1993)
- Clouds Are Not Spheres for flute, cello and piano (1994)
- Odd Shapes Carry Meaning, Symphony in three movements (played without pause) for saxophone orchestra (1996)
- Attempted Claviercide (1996)
- Familiar Objects Seen in a New Light (1998)
- The Framing of This Circle for violin, horn and piano (1999)
- Rivers Run through It, Sonatina for flute and piano (2001)
- Music for the Outer Edge, for flute quartet (2012)
