= William Knox (footballer, fl. 1927–1934) =

Scottish footballer

Personal information
- Full name: William Knox
- Place of birth: Douglas Water, Scotland
- Position: Full back

Senior career*
Years	Team	Apps	(Gls)
- Bathgate
1927–1930	Burnley	23	(0)
1930–1932	Luton Town	0	(0)
1932–1933	Bristol City	19	(1)
1933–1934	Stockport County	0	(0)
- * Club domestic league appearances and goals

William Knox was a Scottish professional footballer who played as a full back.
