= John H. Knox =

United Nations special rapporteur

United Nations Special Rapporteur on Human Rights and the Environment
- In office 2012–2018

John Knox was the first United Nations special rapporteur on human rights and environmental issues serving from 2012 until 2018. Knox is currently Professor of International Law at Wake Forest University.

== Activities ==
- (1994-1998) Legal adviser for the United States Department of State; attorney in private practice, Austin, Texas.
- (1998-2006) Professor at Pennsylvania State University.
- (2002–2005) Legal work with an environmental organization in North America.
- (2006- ) Lecturer at Wake Forest University School of Law.
- (2008–2012) Legal adviser for the government of Maldives.
- (2012-2015) UN Human Rights Council human rights expert in the field of environment.
- (2015- ) Knox became Special Rapporteur for human rights and environmental protection.

== Education ==
Knox graduated with honors from Stanford Law School in 1987 and earned a BA in Economics and English from Rice University in 1984.

== Awards ==
In 2003, the American Society of International Law awarded Knox the Francis Deák Prize, honoring him as a young author who made a "meritorious contribution to international legal scholarship."
