= Thomas P. Knox =

American physician, abolitionist (1818–1889)

- Born: Thomas Parker Knox Jr. September 9, 1818; Warwick, Rhode Island, U.S.
- Died: July 28, 1889 (aged 70); Providence, Rhode Island, U.S.
- Burial place: Greenwood Cemetery, Coventry, Rhode Island, U.S.
- Other name: T. P. Knox
- Occupations: Physician, surgeon, abolitionist, teacher
- Spouse(s): Mary Ann Coggeshall (m. 1844–1847; her death); Angelina J. Berry (m. 1852–c. 1877)
- Children: 2

Thomas Parker Knox Jr., also known as T. P. Knox (September 9, 1818– July 28, 1889) was an American medical doctor, surgeon, and abolitionist, who was active in the Underground Railroad in Massachusetts. He aided fugitive slaves and escaped slaves during the American Civil War. His former home at 29 Myrtle Street in Boston is an Underground Railroad site.

== Early life, education and family ==
Thomas Parker Knox Jr. was born on September 9, 1818, in Warwick, Rhode Island, to parents Leslie Jones (née Lasket) and Thomas Parker Robert Andrew Knox. He was a political follower "Dorrism" led by Rhode Island Gov. Thomas Wilson Dorr (of the Dorr Rebellion), however by 1842 he had felt it had failed. Knox left the state and studied medicine under Dr. Andrus of Natick, Massachusetts.

In 1844, he married Mary Ann Coggeshall, however she died a few years later in 1847 at age 28. Knox re-married in 1852 in Boston, to Angelina J. Berry (1819–1896) from Belfast, Maine. His wife had been a missionary in Saginaw to the Anishinaabe people and was an abolitionist. Together they had two children, however his first born son died in infancy c. 1852. In their early marriage they lived in Hyannis, Massachusetts, and after their son's death they moved to Boston to begin work as abolitionists. Knox and his wife read the new book, Uncle Tom's Cabin (1852) by Harriet Beecher Stowe, and had connected their own grief with the grief of the broken families of the enslaved.

== Career ==
He worked as a physician and surgeon in Boston, offering medical care for Black patients, many of which were poor. From 1855–1859, the Knox family lived at 29 Myrtle Street in Boston, and aided fugitive and escaped slaves. This home is now an Underground Railroad historical site, noted by the National Park Service. While living in Massachusetts, Knox became a follower of William Lloyd Garrison, noted journalist and abolitionist.

"Under this unrighteous and oppressive treatment, universal sadness is written on every countenance"

— Knox in his publication Startling Revelations (1864)

Knox served in the United States Army as a contract surgeon, treating freedmen in South Carolina during the American Civil War (1861–1865). He published in 1864 a scathing account of the National Freedmen's Relief Association, and accused the relief organization of fraud, and exposed his accounts of settlements with the viral disease smallpox, women and children living in poor conditions on settlements with a lack of clothing, and skilled men discriminated against and receiving much less money for their labor. Some of the settlements described were Coosaw Island, Coru Island, "Ladies' Island" and St. Helena Island. His account was later published in the Anglo-African newspaper. Knox was accused of being an extremist and stirring, "Negro opposition to white leaders" in the Republican Party.

Sometime after the American Civil War, he moved to South Carolina to work as a teacher. Around 1876, he moved to Providence, Rhode Island.

Knox died on July 28, 1889, in Providence, Rhode Island, and was buried at Greenwood Cemetery in Coventry, Rhode Island.

== Publications ==
- Knox, Thomas P. (October 12, 1860). "Explanatory Letter from Dr. T. P. Knox". The Liberator. p. 2 – via Newspapers.com.
- Knox, Thomas P. (1864). Startling Revelations From The Department Of South Carolina, and Expose Of The So Called National Freedmen's Relief Association (PDF). Boston, MA: William M. Kendall, Printer.

== See also ==
- Rufus Saxton
