= National Freedman's Relief Association =

The National Freedman's Relief Association was an organization to support African Americans organized in the wake of the American Civil War. It provided agricultural tools, food, shelter, clothing, religious guidance, and opened schools. It published the National Freedman newspaper.

Its first annual report was published in 1863.

It was organized in 1862. Francis George Shaw served as its president, Rev. W. G. (William George) Hawkins Corresponding Secretary, E. C. Estes Secretary of Executive Committee and Business Agent, and Rev. James L. Woolsey Secretary of Teachers and Finance Committee. Its address was 76 John Street in New York City. Joseph B. Collins was its treasurer.

Laura Haviland wrote a first-hand account of an assault on Sojourner Truth by a conductor in Washington D.C. in 1865. The same issue published the recently passed Thirteenth Amendment to the United States Constitution.

Seymour B. Durst's collection included Brief history of the New York National Freedmen's Relief Association : to which are added some interesting details of the work together with a brief view of the whole field, and the objects to be accomplished, concluding with the fourth annual report of the association for 1865, with statement and appeal published in 1866.

In 1864, Thomas P. Knox's scathing account of the group was published. He accused the group of defrauding the public and failing to provide the assistance it claimed.

A branch of the group was established in Washington D.C.

== See also ==
- Freedmen's Bureau
