= James Knox (Montana politician) =

American politician

Member of the Montana House of Representatives from the 47 district

Personal details
- Born: December 6, 1965 (age 60) San Francisco, California
- Party: Republican

James Knox (born December 6, 1965, in San Francisco, California) is an American politician. Elected in 2010, he is a Republican member of the Montana Legislature. He was elected to House District 47 which representsBillings and a portion of the Yellowstone County area.

In 2011, Knox spoke out in favor of repealing Montana's medical marijuana legislation.
