= William Knox (cricketer) =

Scottish cricketer

Personal information
- Born: 20 November 1903; Paisley, Renfrewshire, Scotland
- Died: 11 June 1954 (aged 50); Paisley, Renfrewshire, Scotland
- Batting: Right-handed

Domestic team information
- Years: Team
- 1938: Scotland

Career statistics
Competition	First-class
Matches	1
Runs scored	0
Batting average	0.00
100s/50s	–/–
Top score	0
Catches/stumpings	1/–
- Source: Cricinfo, 3 November 2022

William Knox (20 November 1903 — 11 June 1954) was a Scottish first-class cricketer.

Knox was born at Paisley in November 1903. A club cricketer for Kelburne, he made a single appearance in first-class cricket for Scotland against Yorkshire at Harrogate in 1938. Batting twice in the match as a middle order batsman, he was dismissed without scoring by Ellis Robinson in Scotland's first innings, while in their second innings he was dismissed for the same score by Frank Smailes. Knox died at Paisley in June 1954.
