= John Knox (footballer) =

Australian rules footballer

Personal information
- Full name: John Knox
- Born: 4 July 1941 (age 85)
- Original team: Collingwood Fourths
- Height: 183 cm (6 ft 0 in)
- Weight: 80 kg (176 lb)

Playing career^{1}
| Years | Club | Games (Goals) |
| 1962–64 | Collingwood | 27 (6) |
- ^{1} Playing statistics correct to the end of 1964.

John Knox is a former Australian rules footballer who played with Collingwood in the Victorian Football League (VFL).

Knox was captain - coach of Yarrawonga in the Ovens & Murray Football League in 1965.
