= Myra Knox =

Canadian-born American physician

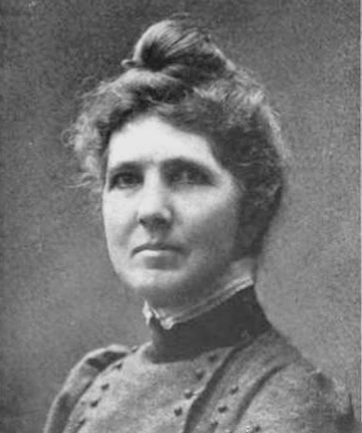
Dr. Myra Knox (1903)

Myra Knox (1853 – October 30, 1915) was a Canadian-born American physician. Having been a teacher before her career in medicine, she became the first woman in California to be appointed to a board of education.

== Biography ==
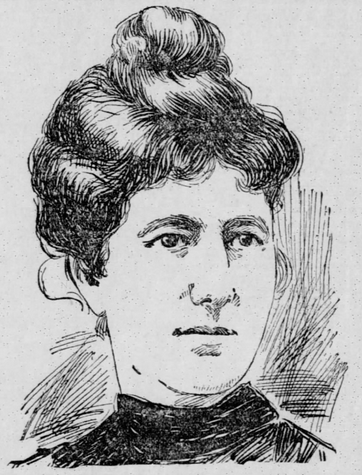
Dr. Myra Knox (1897)

Myra Knox was born in 1853, in New Brunswick, British North America. She received her early education in Minneapolis, where her family had removed and where she herself married. On her way west with her husband, Clifford Knox, and her two small children, she suddenly became a widow, the husband dying in Nevada. The young woman proceeded to California and took up the study of medicine. In 1884, she graduated from the Cooper Medical Institute (now Stanford University School of Medicine) in San Francisco, and practiced her profession in Oakland thereafter.

She was the first woman in California to be appointed to a board of education, serving for twelve years on the Oakland board after her appointment in the early 1890s. She was also for many years physician at the State Home for the Blind in Oakland and also served on the Merritt Hospital Board of Physicians (now Alta Bates Summit Medical Center).

Knox was the first woman to receive the nomination for School Director in Oakland from any political party, having received two nominations and having her name proposed by still another party convention. The Republic party first proposed her, but after inserting a plank in their platform advocating women for School Directors, defeated her in the balloting. Then the Populists nominated her for School Director-at-large, and the Non-Partisans did likewise. Though a liberal woman, and well-known through her large medical practice, she had never taken a prominent position in political matters, and said she did not know why her name was brought forward for the office, "unless", she said, "it is because I was once a school teacher. Of course I think it is right that women should have charge of the schools, but I had never thought of the matter in the light of holding office."

During this time, she took an active part in club and civic affairs. A member of both Ebell Society and of the Home Club, she formed the first Oakland improvement association to be led by a woman. She was one of the leading spirits in securing the city's Carnegie library (now the African American Museum and Library at Oakland) and in bringing about various reforms desired by the women of the city. For example, she advised the girls of the Oakland High School to discard corsets and to eat more healthy lunches, containing less pie, cake, and pickles.

In religion, she belonged to the Unitarian Church. Knox died October 30, 1915, at Merritt Hospital, where she had been for a week suffering from a cerebral hemorrhage.
