= Angelina J. Knox =

American inventor, abolitionist (1819–1896)

- Born: Angelina J. Berry; July 17, 1819; Belfast, Maine, U.S.
- Died: January 24, 1896 (aged 76); Fresno, California, U.S.
- Burial place: Mountain View Cemetery, Fresno, California, U.S.
- Occupations: Inventor, abolitionist, writer, philanthropist
- Spouse: Thomas P. Knox (m. 1852–c. 1877)

Angelina J. Knox (née Angelina J. Berry; July 17, 1819 – January 24, 1896) was an American inventor, abolitionist, writer, and philanthropist. She aided fugitive slaves and escaped slaves during the American Civil War. Her former home at 29 Myrtle Street in Boston is an Underground Railroad site.

== Early life, and family ==
Angelina J. Berry was born on July 17, 1819, in Belfast, Maine, to parents Elizabeth Betsey (née Nickerson) and Col. Watson Berry.

In 1852 in Boston, she married Thomas Parker Knox from Warwick, Rhode Island. Together they had two children, however her first born son died in infancy c. 1852. In their early marriage they lived in Hyannis, Massachusetts, and after their son's death they moved to Boston to begin work as abolitionists. The Knox family read the new book, Uncle Tom's Cabin (1852) by Harriet Beecher Stowe, and had connected their own grief with the grief of the broken families of the enslaved.

== Career ==
Knox was a member of the Congregational church, starting at a young age. At the age of 28 she moved to Saginaw, Michigan, to work as a missionary to the Anishinaabe (Ojibway) people.

She worked for three years as an assistant to Judge James G. Birney, the first abolitionist candidate for President under the Liberty Party.

From 1855–1859, the Knox family lived at 29 Myrtle Street in Boston, and aided fugitive and escaped slaves. This home is now an Underground Railroad historical site, noted by the National Park Service.

Knox was noted for her charity work and founded the Old Ladies' Home in Boston, an organization for elderly Black women.

Knox also worked as an inventor. On February 7, 1865, she patented a natural method to preserve dried flowers by using wax, which was published in Scientific America a year earlier. On October 30, 1866, she filed a patent with the United States Patent Office for a wash bowl and water closet combined. Knox made considerable funds from her inventions, and donated 40% of her income to support American Civil War veterans, and her abolitionism.

After the American Civil War ended, she went to Canada with John Greenleaf Whittier and others to investigate the conditions of fugitive slaves living there. She later wrote about what she witnessed.

== Late life and death ==
In 1877, she moved to East Oakland, California, followed by a move to San Francisco, and later Sacramento. In 1889, Knox moved to Fresno, California where she lived for the last 7 years of her life. She died on January 24, 1896, in Fresno.

In July 1969, the Berkeley Gazette newspaper published a short column about her life, in her honor.
