= Robert Knox (private equity investor) =

Robert A. Knox
- Born: March 4, 1952
- Education: Boston University; Boston University School of Management
- Occupations: Private Equity, Finance
- Known for: Founder of Cornerstone Equity Investors

Robert A. Knox (born March 4, 1952), is a private equity investor, a founder and senior managing director of Cornerstone Equity Investors. He was chairman of Boston University's board of trustees from 2008 to 2016.

== Career ==
Knox designed and executed the initial Alternative Asset investment strategy at Prudential Financial beginning in 1981 and was chairman and chief executive officer of Prudential Equity Investors, the private equity subsidiary of Prudential. Subsequently, Knox and other executives founded Cornerstone Equity Investors, a New York-based investment firm.

Cornerstone has funded over 120 companies through buyouts and growth equity financing in healthcare services and products, business services, technology and consumer products. Portfolio investments have included Dell Computer, Health Management Associates, Linear Technology, Micron Technology, Centurion, Team Health, and True Temper Sports.

Knox has served on the boards of more than 25 private and public companies and has a long history of expertise in the healthcare sector as well as broad experience in technology, finance and consumer product companies. He currently serves on the boards of directors of Health Management Associates (NYSE) and several other private firms.

== See also ==
- Health Management Associates
