= Edward M. Knox =

American Medal of Honor recipients (1842–1916)

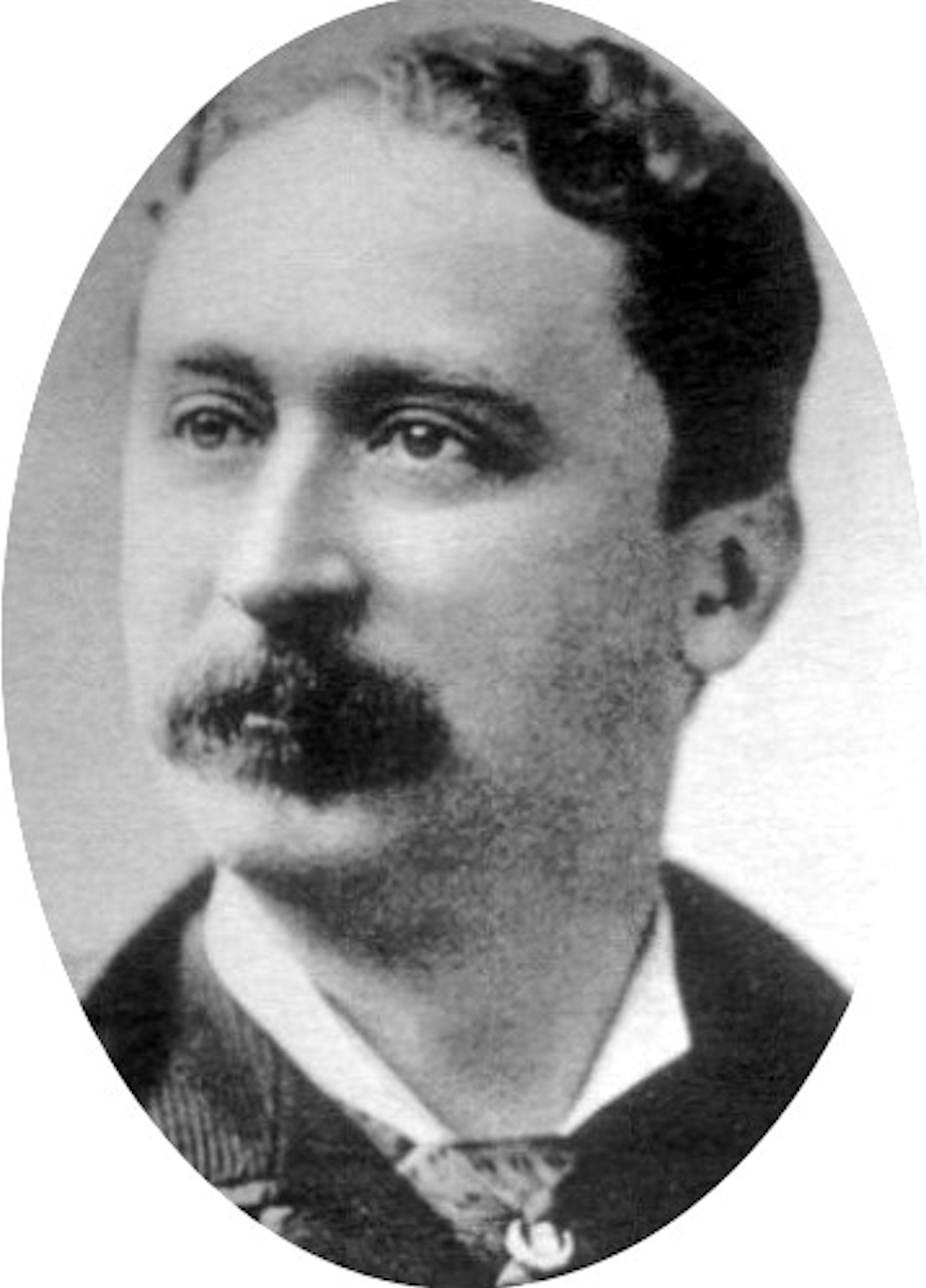
- Born: February 12, 1842; Manhattan, New York
- Died: March 28, 1916 (aged 74)
- Burial place: The Bronx, New York
- Military career
- Allegiance: United States
- Branch: Union Army
- Rank: Second Lieutenant
- Unit: 15th New York Battery Light Artillery
- Conflicts: American Civil War: Battle of Gettysburg
- Awards: Medal of Honor

Edward M. Knox (February 12, 1842 – March 28, 1916) was a Union Army soldier in the American Civil War who received the U.S. military's highest decoration, the Medal of Honor.

Knox was born in Manhattan, New York, on February 12, 1842. He was awarded the Medal of Honor, for extraordinary heroism on July 2, 1863, while serving as a Second Lieutenant with the 15th New York Battery Light Artillery, at Gettysburg, Pennsylvania. His Medal of Honor was issued on October 18, 1892.

He died at the age of 74 on March 28, 1916, and was buried at Woodlawn Cemetery in the Bronx, New York.

== Medal of Honor citation ==
The President of the United States of America, in the name of Congress, takes pleasure in presenting the Medal of Honor to Second Lieutenant Edward M. Knox, United States Army, for extraordinary heroism on 2 July 1863, while serving with 15th New York Battery Light Artillery, in action at Gettysburg, Pennsylvania. Second Lieutenant Knox held his ground with the battery after the other batteries had fallen back until compelled to draw his piece off by hand; he was severely wounded.

== See also ==
- List of Medal of Honor recipients for the Battle of Gettysburg
- List of American Civil War Medal of Honor recipients: G–L
