= Tommy Knox =

English footballer (1905–1954)

Personal information
- Full name: Thomas Knox
- Date of birth: 11 November 1905
- Place of birth: Ushaw Moor, County Durham, England
- Date of death: 27 November 1954 (aged 49)
- Place of death: Carlisle, England
- Height: 5 ft 9 1/2 in (1.77 m)
- Position: Goalkeeper

Senior career*
Years	Team	Apps	(Gls)
- Ushaw Moor Labour Party
192?–1929	Bearpark Welfare		
1929–19??	Chilton Colliery Recreation		
- Durham City
- Crook Town
1931–1933	Darlington	48	(0)
1933–1934	Hartlepools United	25	(0)
1934–1936	Notts County	72	(0)
1936	Crystal Palace	3	(0)
1936–1937	Norwich City	0	(0)
1937–1939	Carlisle United	63	(0)
- * Club domestic league appearances and goals

Thomas Knox (11 November 1905 – 27 November 1954) was an English footballer who made 211 appearances in the Football League in the 1930s playing as a goalkeeper for Darlington, Hartlepools United, Notts County, Crystal Palace and Carlisle United. He was on the books of Norwich City without playing for them in the League, had trials with Bolton Wanderers, Bradford City and Leeds United before making his league debut with Darlington, and played non-league football for clubs including Ushaw Moor Labour Party, Bearpark Welfare, West Stanley, Chilton Colliery Recreation, Durham City and Crook Town.

During the Second World War, he acted as trainer to the Blackhall Colliery Welfare team, and afterwards went into business in Blackhall while acting as a scout for Notts County. He later moved to Carlisle, where he died in November 1954.
