= Tugny-et-Pont =

- Commune
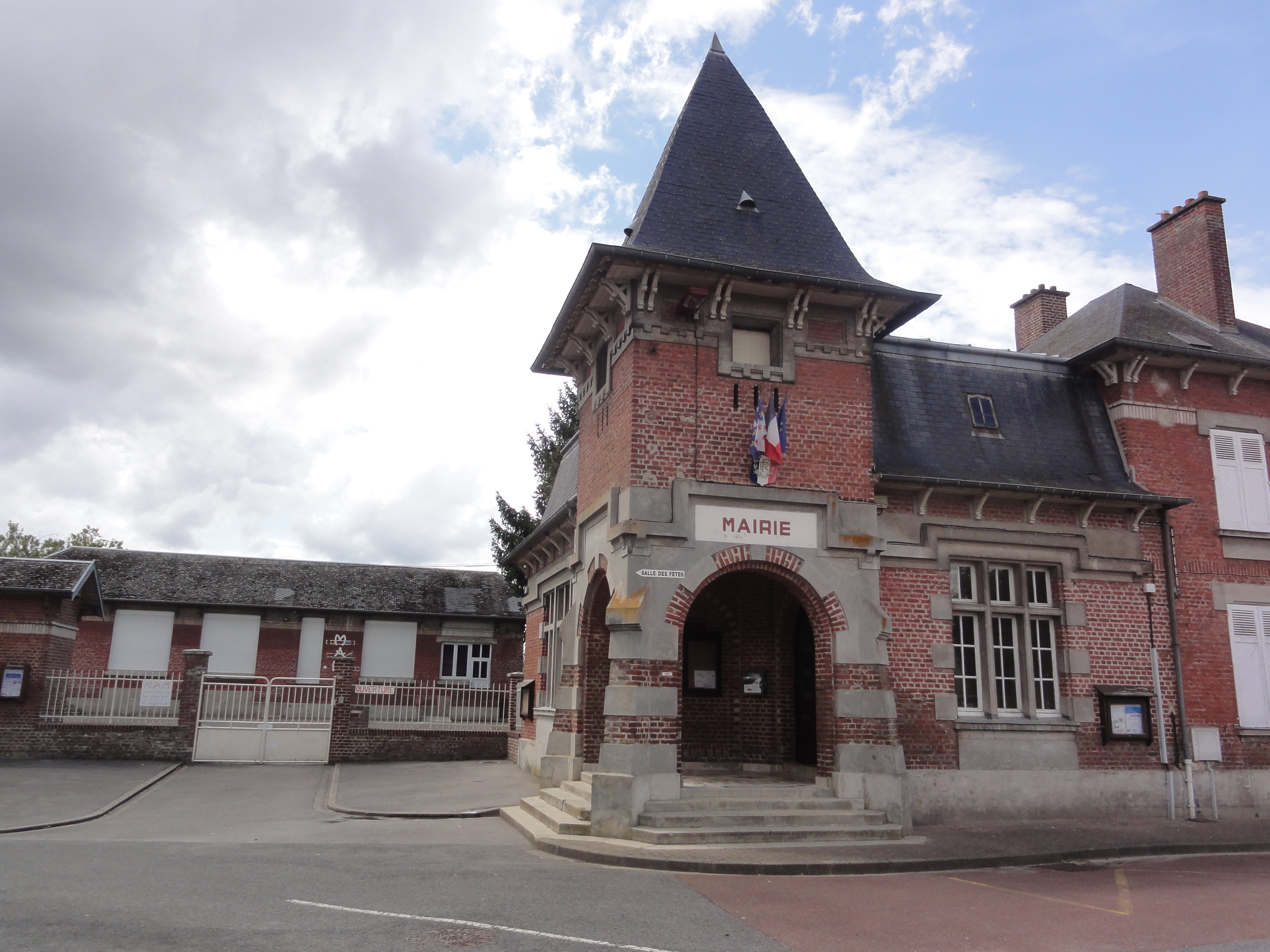
- The town hall of Tugny-et-Pont
- Location of Tugny-et-Pont
- Location within France Location within Hauts-de-France
- Coordinates: 49°45′32″N 3°09′19″E
- Country: France
- Region: Hauts-de-France
- Department: Aisne
- Arrondissement: Saint-Quentin
- Canton: Ribemont
- Intercommunality: CA Saint-Quentinois

Government
  - Mayor (2026–32): Grégoire Bono
- Area^{1}: 5.89 km^{2} (2.27 sq mi)
- Elevation: 65 m (213 ft)
- Highest elevation: 93 m (305 ft)
- Lowest elevation: 62 m (203 ft)
- Population (2023): 282
  - Density: 47.9/km^{2} (124/sq mi)
- Time zone: UTC+01:00 (CET)
  - Summer (DST): UTC+02:00 (CEST)
- INSEE/Postal code: 02752 /02640
- ^{1} French Land Register data, which excludes lakes, ponds, glaciers > 1 km^{2} (0.386 sq mi or 247 acres) and river estuaries.

Tugny-et-Pont (French pronunciation: [tyɲi e pɔ̃]) is a commune in the Aisne department in Hauts-de-France in northern France.

== Population ==
Historical population
Year	Pop.	±% p.a.
1968	263	—
1975	259	−0.22%
1982	251	−0.45%
1990	288	+1.73%
1999	268	−0.80%
2007	240	−1.37%
2012	289	+3.79%
2017	275	−0.99%
2023	282	+0.42%
Source: INSEE

== See also ==
- Communes of the Aisne department
- List of medieval bridges in France
