= George William Knox =

American religious leader

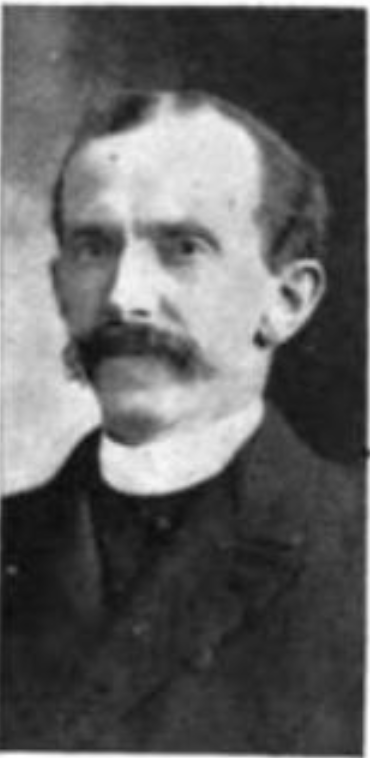
Knox in 1906

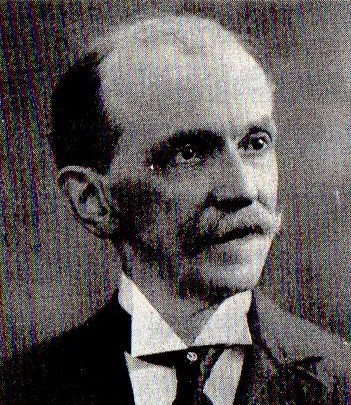

George William Knox, D.D., LL.D. (August 11, 1853– April 25, 1912) was an American Presbyterian theologian and writer, born at Rome, New York. He graduated from Hamilton College in 1874, and from Auburn Theological Seminary in 1877, after which he went as a missionary to Japan, where he was professor of homiletics in Tokyo and professor of philosophy and ethics at the Imperial University of Tokyo.

Following his return to the United States, he was pastor at Rye, New York. In 1897–1899 he lectured at Union Theological Seminary.

== Works ==
He published in Japanese:

- A Brief System of Theology
- Outlines of Homiletics
- The Basis of Ethics
- The Mystery of Life;

and in English:

- A Japanese Philosopher (1893)
- The Christian Point of View, with Francis Brown and A. C. McGiffert (1902)
- The Direct and Fundamental Proofs of the Christian Religion (1903, 1908)
- Japanese Life in Town and Country (1904)
- Imperial Japan (1905)
- The Spirit of the Orient (1906)
- The Development of Religion in Japan (1907)
- The Gospel of Jesus (1909)
- "Christianity" . Encyclopædia Britannica. Vol. 6 (11th ed.). 1911.
