= George L. Knox =

American Author and former slave (1841–1927)

George L. Knox Sr.
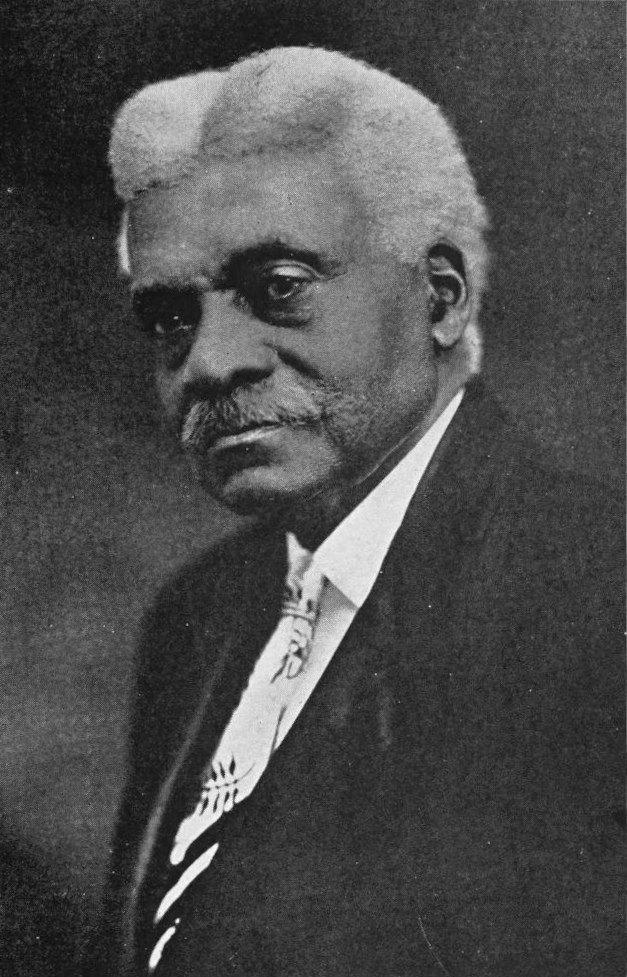
- Born: George Levi Knox; September 16, 1841; Statesville, Tennessee, US
- Died: August 24, 1927 (aged 85); Richmond, Virginia, US
- Occupation: Barber shop owner
- Spouses: Auralia S. Harvey (m. 1865–1910) Margaret Nickens (m. 1914)
- Children: William; Nellie; Edward; Elwood
- Relatives: Nancy Fisher (mother); Hulda (sister); Charles (brother)
- Writing career
- Notable works: Slave and Freeman, the Autobiography of George L. Knox

George Levi Knox (September 16, 1841 – August 24, 1927) was an American escaped slave, soldier, activist, publisher, and author in Indianapolis, Indiana.

Knox was born in Statesville, Tennessee, to enslaved parents. He was a runaway slave who served both the South and the North in the American Civil War. Later in life he published The Indianapolis Freeman from 1893 to 1926. Knox also owned a Negro league baseball team, Indianapolis's Barber B.B.C.

His grandson George L. Knox II was a pilot with the Tuskegee Airman during World War II.

== Early life ==
Knox was born in Statesville, Tennessee, in 1841 and was sold into slavery in 1844, at three years of age. He married Auralia Susie Harvey in 1865 and together they had four children.

During the Civil War his master took him to the front lines. Knox escaped and joined the Union where he accompanied the 55th Indiana Infantry Regiment. As a slave, Knox was taken by his master to the front lines to serve the Confederate States of America. He was able to escape and was welcomed by the Northern Union troops. He served with 57th Indiana Infantry Regiment as a teamster. Eventually he made his way to Indianapolis with the 55th and left the military service. Following the end of the war, Knox moved to Greenfield, Indiana, possibly because many veterans of the 57th Regiment lived in its vicinity.

After the war, Knox learned the barber business. He was successful and in 1884 he opened his own barber and shaving parlor business at a cost of $10,000 (~$358,333 in 2025).

== Career ==
Knox was active in politics during the late 19th and early 20th centuries as a member of the Indiana Republican Party. By 1892, he had emerged as the most influential Black Republican in Indiana and served on the Republican State Central Committee. He was an alternate delegate to the 1892 and 1896 Republican National Conventions. Knox grew disillusioned with the Republican Party following the Brownsville affair and unsuccessfully ran for the United States Congress as an independent candidate in 1906. He returned to the Republican Party in 1908, but remained critical of the party's position on race. After the Ku Klux Klan gained control of the Indiana Republican Party during the 1924 election, Knox left the party and urged Black voters to support the state and national Democratic candidates.

In 1884, Knox moved to Indianapolis and opened several barbershops and shaving parlors. The barbershops employed black barbers but only served white people. He met many influential white people through his whites only barber shops, and he had an unsuccessful run for US Congress.

In the early 1900s, Knox ran shaving parlors in Indianapolis. He owned an amateur Negro baseball team which was called Indianapolis's Barber Base Ball Club (B.B.C.). His son Elwood pitched for the team.

Knox purchased The Indianapolis Freeman, an African-American newspaper (or race paper), and was the publisher from 1893 to 1926. The weekly paper was called "A National Illustrated Colored Newspaper". Booker T. Washington was a contributor. The paper had a circulation of 25,000. It was also sold internationally and covered everything from small black communities to sports and entertainment. The paper came out on Sundays and it was said their negative review of could ruin a career.

In December 1894, when Knox was 44, he began publishing his memoirs in The Indianapolis Freeman, with each weekly edition carrying a chapter under the title Life as I Remember It – As a Slave and Freeman. It was first published in book form in 1979 by University Press of Kentucky under the title Slave and Freeman, the Autobiography of George L. Knox, with an introduction by Willard B. Gatewood.

Knox's first wife, Auralia, died in 1910. In 1914, he married a woman named Mrs. Margaret Nickens.

== Death ==
Knox died on August 24, 1927, in Richmond, Virginia, from a paralytic stroke.

== See also ==
- List of African-American abolitionists
- List of enslaved people
- List of African-American activists
- Slavery in the United States
