= George L. Knox II =

American Tuskegee Airman fighter pilot (1916–1964)

Lieutenant colonel George L. Knox II
- George L. Knox II
- Born: George Levi Knox II; December 23, 1916; Indianapolis, Indiana, US
- Died: November 4, 1964 (aged 47); Tuskegee, Macon County, Alabama, US
- Burial place: Crown Hill Cemetery and Arboretum, Section 39, Lot 201; 39.8188017°N 86.1653289°W
- Education: Fisk University
- Spouse: Yvonne Marguerite Wright Knox
- Relatives: Grandfather George L. Knox; Children: *Adelaide Emma Sons: *George Levi III. *John Elwood *Craig Streeter
- Military career
- Allegiance: United States
- Branch: United States Army Air Force
- Service years: 1941–1964
- Rank: Lieutenant colonel
- Nickname: Skipper
- Unit: 332nd Fighter Group
- Awards: World War II Victory Medal; Air force Longevity Service Medal with three bronze oak leaf clusters; American Campaign Medal; American Defense Service Medal; Congressional Gold Medal

George Levi Knox II ("Skipper" Knox) (December 23, 1916 – November 4, 1964) was a U.S. Army Air Force/U.S. Air Force officer, combat fighter pilot and Adjutant with the all-African American 332nd Fighter Group's 100th Fighter Squadron, best known as the Tuskegee Airmen. One of the 1,007 documented Tuskegee Airmen Pilots, he was a member of the Tuskegee Airmen's third-ever aviation cadet class, and one of the first twelve African Americans to become combat fighter pilots. He was the second Indiana native to graduate from the Tuskegee Advanced Flying School (TAFS).

He was one of the ten presiding officers in the courts-martial of several Tuskegee Airmen after the Freeman Field mutiny in 1945. He was named president after Benjamin O. Davis Jr. was dismissed. (Note: Benjamin O. Davis Jr. was dismissed from the court after a challenge, Knox was named president. See historic photograph with press release in section Freeman Field mutiny#Release of the 101.)

== Early life ==
He was born on December 23, 1916, in Indianapolis, Indiana, Marion County, Indiana. He was the son of Elwood Knox and the grandson of runaway slave George L. Knox (who wrote a book about his experiences, Life as I Remember It: As a Slave and a Freeman, in 1895).

He was a graduate of Fisk University. On January 27, 1937, he was initiated as a fraternity brother of Kappa Alpha Psi fraternity's Nu chapter in Indiana. He then attended the University of Pittsburgh and earned a graduate certificate.

On December 3, 1942, he married Yvonne Marguerite Wright Knox (August 27, 1919 – August 18, 2002), in Atlanta, Georgia. They were the parents of four children: Adelaide Emma, George Levi III., John Elwood and Craig Streeter.

== Military service ==
=== World War II ===
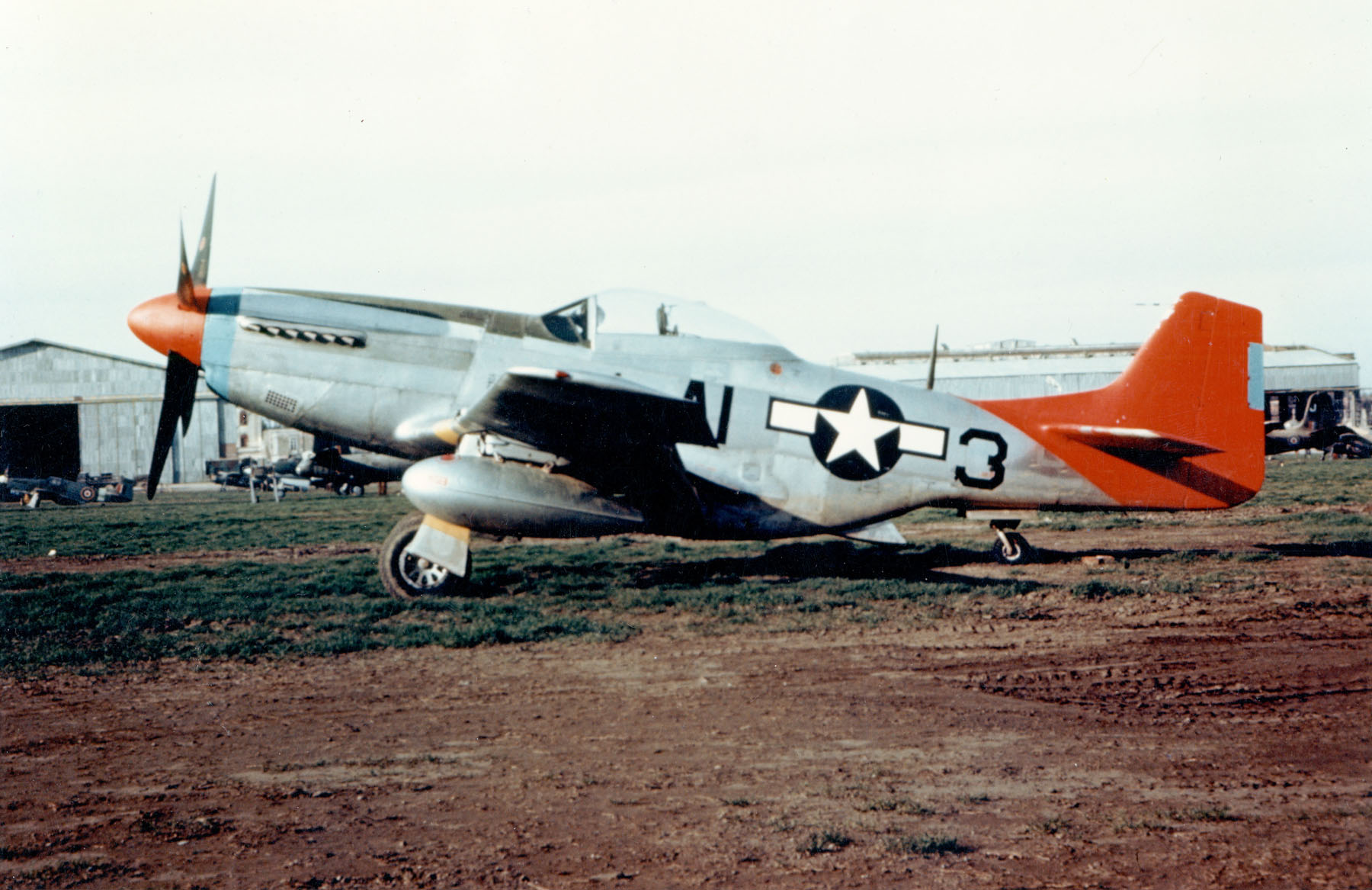
Photo of a P-51 Mustang. The Tuskegee Airmen's aircraft had distinctive markings that led to the name, "Red Tails." (Note: The red markings that distinguished the Tuskegee Airmen included red bands on the noses of P-51s as well as a red rudder; their P-51B and D Mustangs flew with similar color schemes, with red propeller spinners, yellow wing bands and all-red tail surfaces.)

In October 1941, he entered the U.S. Army Air Corps at Fort Benjamin Harrison in Indianapolis, Indiana. On May 20, 1942, he graduated from Tuskegee Advance Flying School (TAFS)'s third-ever Single Engine Section Class SE-42-E. He was one of the first twelve African American combat fighter pilots.

He was the second Indiana native to graduate from the Tuskegee Advance Flying School (TAFS). After receiving his wings and commission as a 2nd Lieutenant, he was promoted to First Lieutenant in December 1942. In 1943 he was with the 332nd Fighter Group, became a flight leader, and was assigned to Selfridge Field, Michigan. A year later, he was a member of the "first Negro bombardment organization", the 477th Bombardment Group; in 1944, the squadron had received two commendations for its achievements. At the rank of Captain, he was the "squad's most experienced Negro flier".

=== Freeman Field mutiny ===
In 1945, he was president of the court assembled to pass judgment on a "racial incident" at Freeman Field, in Seymour, Indiana. He was one of ten officers to preside over the Freeman Field mutiny courts-martial, appointed by General Frank O'Driscoll Hunter: Colonel Benjamin O. Davis Jr., Captains George L. Knox II, James T. Wiley, John H. Duren, Charles R. Stanton, William T. Yates, Elmore M. Kennedy, and Fitzroy Newsum and 1st Lieutenants William Robert Ming Jr. James Y. Carter. Trial Judge Advocates were: Captain James W. Redden and 1st Lieutenant Charles B. Hall.

After World War II, he headed the AFROTC program at Tuskegee Institute. In 1946, he held the rank of Major. The highest rank he held, at his death in 1964, was lieutenant colonel; he was a professor of air science at the officer training corps at Tuskegee. He was a member of St. Philip's Episcopal Church in Indianapolis, and St. Andrew's Episcopal Church in Tuskegee.

== Awards ==
- World War II Victory Medal
- Air force Longevity Service Medal with three bronze oak leaf clusters
- American Campaign Medal
- American Defense Service Medal
- Congressional Gold Medal awarded to the Tuskegee Airmen in 2006

== Death ==
He died on November 4, 1964, in Tuskegee, Alabama, Macon County, Alabama. His obituary in a Mobile Alabama newspaper reported that he died from an accidental gunshot at his home.

== See also ==
- List of Tuskegee Airmen Cadet Pilot Graduation Classes
- List of Tuskegee Airmen
- Military history of African Americans
- Dogfights (TV series)
- Executive Order 9981
- The Tuskegee Airmen (movie)
