= Charlotte County, Florida =

County in Florida, United States

- County
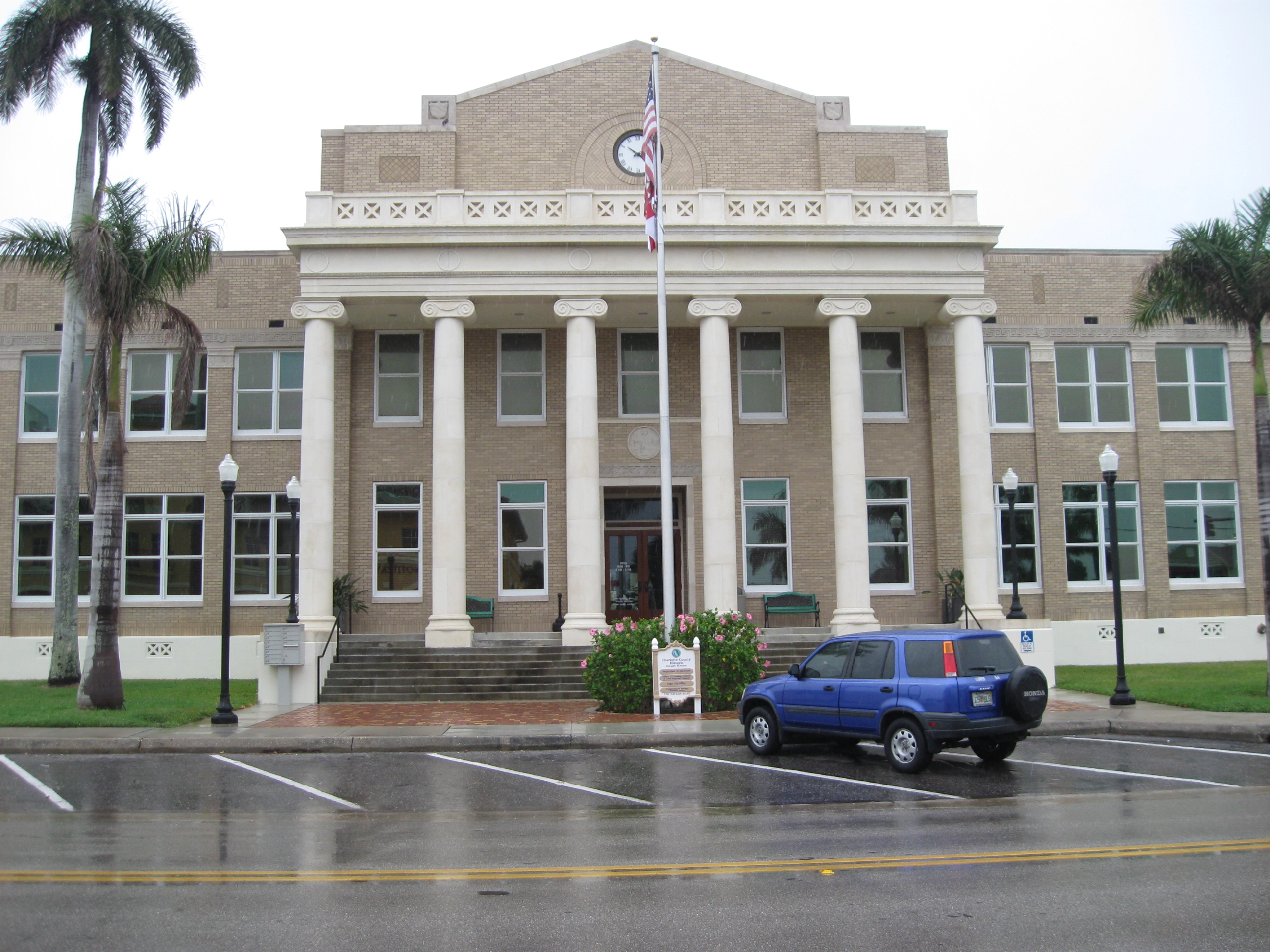
- The Old Charlotte County Courthouse at Punta Gorda in April 2010.

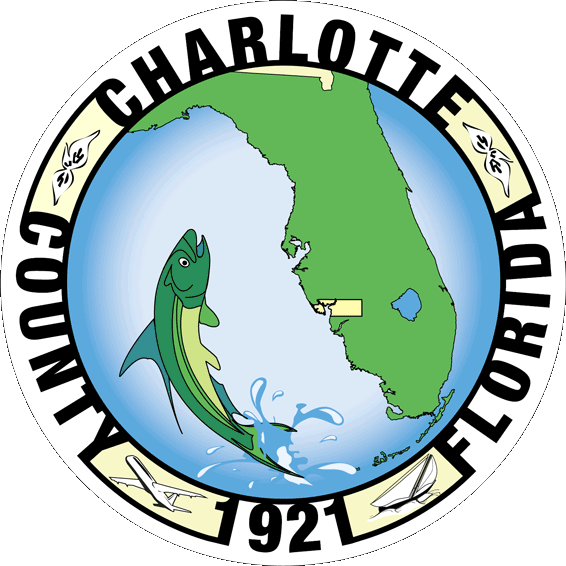
- Seal Logo

- Location within the U.S. state of Florida
- Coordinates: 26°54′N 81°57′W
- Country: United States
- State: Florida
- Founded: April 23, 1921
- Named for: Charlotte Harbor
- Seat: Punta Gorda
- Largest community: Port Charlotte

Area
  - Total: 858 sq mi (2,220 km^{2})
  - Land: 680 sq mi (1,800 km^{2})
  - Water: 178 sq mi (460 km^{2}) 20.7%

Population (2020)
  - Total: 186,847
  - Estimate (2025): 217,212 ▲
  - Density: 275/sq mi (106/km^{2})
- Time zone: UTC−5 (Eastern)
  - Summer (DST): UTC−4 (EDT)
- Congressional district: 17th
- Website: www.charlottecountyfl.gov

Charlotte County is a U.S. county located in southwestern Florida. As of the 2020 census, the population was 186,847. Its county seat is Punta Gorda.

Charlotte County comprises the Punta Gorda, FL Metropolitan Statistical Area, which is included in the North Port-Bradenton-Sarasota Combined Statistical Area.

== History ==
Charlotte County was established April 23, 1921. Before this, the Charlotte County area was a part of Desoto County. It was named for the Bay of Charlotte Harbor. "Charlotte" came from "Carlota" (Spanish). In 1565, the Spanish named "Bahia de Carlota", followed by the English in 1775 who named the area Charlotte Harbor in tribute to Queen Charlotte. Punta Gorda is the only incorporated city in Charlotte County.

On August 13, 2004, Charlotte County, Hurricane Charley came ashore near Port Charlotte as a Category 4 hurricane. On September 28, 2022, Charlotte County was struck by Hurricane Ian, which made a second landfall near the city of Punta Gorda, Florida.

=== Historic places ===
There are seventeen properties and districts in Charlotte County listed on the National Register of Historic Places. Most of the officially recognized places are in Punta Gorda, Placida, and El Jobean. Additionally, there are numerous places generally considered historic despite not being officially listed as such, including the Old Charlotte County Courthouse, the Blanchard House Museum, and Port Charlotte Middle School.

Port Charlotte Middle School (originally Port Charlotte Junior High School) was recognized by the Florida Trust for Historic Preservation as an endangered historic site for their annual 11 to Save properties following Hurricane Ian. The school was further evaluated by the Florida Division of Historical Resources, which determined it is "potentially individually eligible for inclusion in the National Register of Historic Places" and "an excellent example of educational institution architecture during the 1970s."

In 2024, the Blanchard House Museum was named one of the Florida Trust's 11 to Save, also having been affected by Hurricane Ian.

== Geography ==
According to the U.S. Census Bureau, the county has a total area of 858 square miles (2,220 km^{2}), of which 680 square miles (1,800 km^{2}) is land and 178 square miles (460 km^{2}) (20.7%) is water. Charlotte Harbor Estuary is an important natural preserve and one of the most productive in Florida.

The Punta Gorda, Florida Metropolitan Statistical Area, consisting of Charlotte County, was defined by the U.S. Office of Management and Budget in 1992.

=== Adjacent counties ===
- Sarasota County - northwest
- DeSoto County - north
- Highlands County - northeast
- Glades County - east
- Hendry County - southeast
- Lee County - south

=== National protected area ===
- Island Bay National Wildlife Refuge

== Demographics ==
Historical population
Census	Pop.	Note	%±
1930	4,013		—
1940	3,663		−8.7%
1950	4,286		17.0%
1960	12,594		193.8%
1970	27,559		118.8%
1980	58,460		112.1%
1990	110,975		89.8%
2000	141,627		27.6%
2010	159,978		13.0%
2020	186,847		16.8%
2025 (est.)	217,212	▲	16.3%
U.S. Decennial Census; 1790-1960 1900-1990; 1990-2000 2010-2015

=== 2020 census ===
As of the 2020 census, there were 186,847 people, 85,846 households, and 51,016 families residing in the county. The median age was 60.2 years; 12.1% of residents were under the age of 18 and 40.4% of residents were 65 years of age or older. For every 100 females there were 95.2 males, and for every 100 females age 18 and over there were 93.9 males age 18 and over.

The racial makeup of the county was 84.3% White, 5.0% Black or African American, 0.3% American Indian and Alaska Native, 1.4% Asian, <0.1% Native Hawaiian and Pacific Islander, 2.1% from some other race, and 6.9% from two or more races. Hispanic or Latino residents of any race comprised 7.5% of the population.

93.5% of residents lived in urban areas, while 6.5% lived in rural areas.

Of the 85,846 households, 15.1% had children under the age of 18 living in them. Of all households, 52.4% were married-couple households, 16.1% had a male householder with no spouse or partner present, and 24.4% had a female householder with no spouse or partner present. About 28.3% of all households were made up of individuals and 18.2% had someone living alone who was 65 years of age or older.

There were 110,046 housing units, of which 22.0% were vacant. Among occupied housing units, 81.3% were owner-occupied and 18.7% were renter-occupied. The homeowner vacancy rate was 2.4% and the rental vacancy rate was 14.2%.

=== Racial and ethnic composition ===
Charlotte County, Florida – Racial and ethnic composition Note: the US Census treats Hispanic/Latino as an ethnic category. This table excludes Latinos from the racial categories and assigns them to a separate category. Hispanics/Latinos may be of any race.
Race / Ethnicity (NH = Non-Hispanic)	Pop 1980	Pop 1990	Pop 2000	Pop 2010	Pop 2020	% 1980	% 1990	% 2000	% 2010	% 2020
White alone (NH)	56,243	103,437	128,063	137,628	153,700	96.21%	93.21%	90.42%	86.03%	82.26%
Black or African American alone (NH)	1,099	3,857	5,992	8,622	8,870	1.88%	3.48%	4.23%	5.39%	4.75%
Native American or Alaska Native alone (NH)	66	198	286	348	385	0.11%	0.18%	0.20%	0.22%	0.21%
Asian alone (NH)	304	700	1,194	1,884	2,566	0.52%	0.63%	0.84%	1.18%	1.37%
Native Hawaiian or Pacific Islander alone (NH)	x	x	30	49	63	x	x	0.02%	0.03%	0.03%
Other race alone (NH)	61	19	141	184	782	0.10%	0.02%	0.10%	0.12%	0.42%
Mixed race or Multiracial (NH)	x	x	1,254	2,050	6,402	x	x	0.89%	1.28%	3.43%
Hispanic or Latino (any race)	687	2,764	4,667	9,213	14,079	1.18%	2.49%	3.30%	5.76%	7.54%
Total	58,460	110,975	141,627	159,978	186,847	100.00%	100.00%	100.00%	100.00%	100.00%

A map of the racial demographics of Charlotte County, Florida by Census tract Legend: Non-Hispanic White 60–70% 70–80% 80–90% >90%

=== 2010 census ===
As of the 2010 census, there were 159,978 people, 73,370 households, and 44,130 families residing in the county. The population density was 234 people per square mile (90 people/km^{2}). There were 100,632 housing units at an average density of 115 per square mile (44/km^{2}). The racial makeup of the county was 90.05% White, 5.68% Black or African American, 0.26% Native American, 1.19% Asian, 0.04% Pacific Islander, 1.10% from other races, and 1.67% from two or more races. 5.76% of the population were Hispanic or Latino of any race. 92.3% spoke only English at home. 3.0% of the population spoke Spanish at home and 1.1% French.

There were 73,370 households, out of which 17.66% had children under the age of 18 living with them, 59.20% were married couples living together, 7.20% had a female householder with no husband present, and 30.90% were non-families. 26.00% of all households were made up of individuals, and 16.70% had someone living alone who was 65 years of age or older. The average household size was 2.18 and the average family size was 2.56.

In the county, the population was spread out, with 14.30% under the age of 18, 5.38% from 18 to 24, 6.99% from 25 to 34, 39.21% from 35 to 64, and 34.12% who were 65 years of age or older (making this the county with the highest percentage of people over 65 in America). The median age was 56.43 years. For every 100 females there were 94.58 males.

The median age in 2010 for Charlotte County was 55.9 years, second only to Sumter County in Florida.

=== 2000 census ===
According to an October 2001 Census Brief of the 2000 Census, Charlotte County had the highest median age of any U.S. county with a population of more than 100,000 people at 54.3.

== Government and politics ==
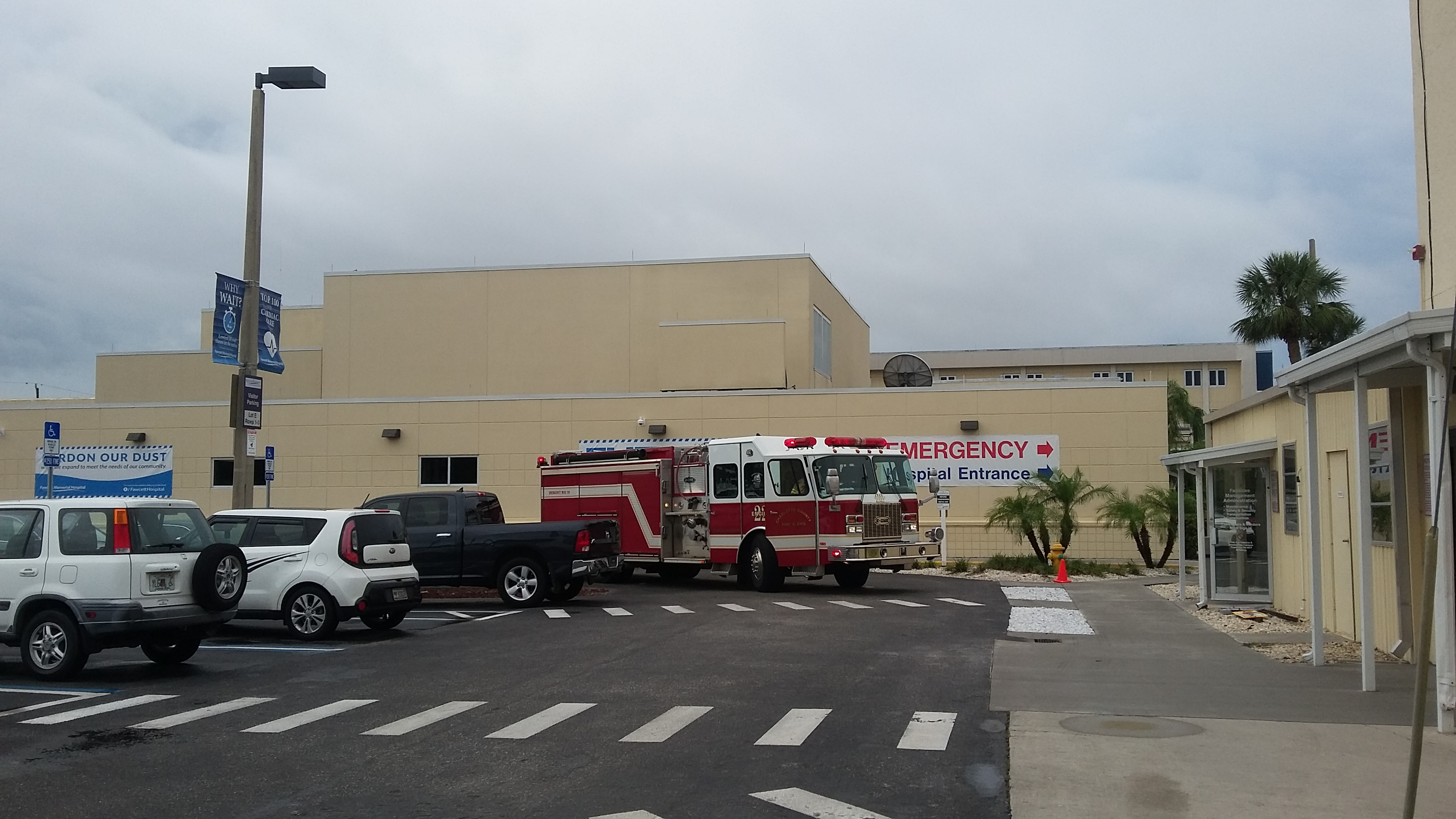
Charlotte County Fire & EMS apparatus at Fawcett Memorial Hospital

The county is governed by a five-person Commission, all of them elected to represent districts within the county for a four-year term. The elections are partisan according to political party affiliation and primaries are held months earlier in the event there are numerous candidates. All registered voters in the county are allowed to vote for a candidate Commissioner in each the five districts, not just the voters living in a particular district.

The five current Commissioners for Charlotte County, Florida and terms of office expirations:

- Ken Doherty (R), District 1, November 3, 2020
- Christopher Constance (R), District 2, November 8, 2022
- Bill Truex (R) District 3, November 3, 2020
- Stephen R. Deutsch (R) District 4, November 8, 2022
- Joe Tiseo (R) District 5, November 3, 2020

Charlotte County, as is typical for the southwestern Florida coast, became and remained a solidly Republican county in the years following the Second World War. No Democrat has won the county since Lyndon Johnson did so during his 1964 landslide, the only time a Democrat has carried the county since Franklin D. Roosevelt in 1944. In the last 60 years, Bill Clinton in 1992 and 1996 was the only Democrat not being outvoted by an absolute majority due to the appeal of Ross Perot. Charlotte resisted George Wallace in the 1968 election to still return an absolute Republican majority, unlike several neighboring counties.

United States presidential election results for Charlotte County, Florida
Year	Republican		Democratic		Third party(ies)	
Year	No.	%	No.	%	No.	%
1924	167	31.21%	321	60.00%	47	8.79%
1928	593	55.73%	441	41.45%	30	2.82%
1932	396	29.33%	954	70.67%	0	0.00%
1936	548	41.20%	782	58.80%	0	0.00%
1940	407	30.90%	910	69.10%	0	0.00%
1944	404	33.86%	789	66.14%	0	0.00%
1948	559	44.09%	520	41.01%	189	14.91%
1952	1,134	58.79%	795	41.21%	0	0.00%
1956	1,589	63.11%	929	36.89%	0	0.00%
1960	3,026	60.92%	1,941	39.08%	0	0.00%
1964	4,163	46.29%	4,831	53.71%	0	0.00%
1968	6,056	50.58%	3,647	30.46%	2,270	18.96%
1972	12,888	76.64%	3,874	23.04%	55	0.33%
1976	12,703	54.44%	10,300	44.14%	330	1.41%
1980	20,486	64.62%	9,769	30.82%	1,445	4.56%
1984	27,486	70.85%	11,305	29.14%	2	0.01%
1988	28,893	63.98%	15,974	35.37%	292	0.65%
1992	24,311	39.17%	22,907	36.91%	14,846	23.92%
1996	27,847	44.18%	27,121	43.03%	8,059	12.79%
2000	35,428	52.96%	29,646	44.31%	1,826	2.73%
2004	44,428	55.68%	34,256	42.93%	1,102	1.38%
2008	45,205	52.87%	39,031	45.65%	1,263	1.48%
2012	47,996	56.52%	35,906	42.28%	1,021	1.20%
2016	60,218	61.96%	33,445	34.41%	3,524	3.63%
2020	73,243	62.84%	42,273	36.27%	1,042	0.89%
2024	82,480	66.45%	40,450	32.59%	1,188	0.96%

United States Senate election results for Charlotte County, Florida1
Year	Republican		Democratic		Third party(ies)	
Year	No.	%	No.	%	No.	%
2024	82,377	67.41%	38,154	31.22%	1,680	1.37%

United States Senate election results for Charlotte County, Florida3
Year	Republican		Democratic		Third party(ies)	
Year	No.	%	No.	%	No.	%
2022	63,845	69.06%	27,757	30.02%	846	0.92%

Florida Gubernatorial election results for Charlotte County
Year	Republican		Democratic		Third party(ies)	
Year	No.	%	No.	%	No.	%
2022	65,473	70.52%	27,031	29.11%	344	0.37%

=== Voter registration ===
Voter Registration and Party Membership as of August 31, 2024:
Party	Number of Votes	Percentage
Republican	78,449	51.23%
No Party Affiliation	37,196	24.29%
Democratic	31,980	20.88%
Minor parties	5,506	3.60%
Total	153,131	100.0%

== Economy ==
Charlotte County attracted plentiful new commercial developers and companies in 2023, continuing the county’s growth trend of the last several years. Most of the building activity is taking place within industrial areas surrounding Punta Gorda Airport, as much of the rest of the county’s land is zoned for residential use, and the land that is zoned commercial outside the airport area has insufficient acreage to support large-scale projects.

Another program the Economic Development Department is working with is an affordable housing initiative called the “Live Local Act.”

The program was created by the Florida Legislature to fund and incentivize workforce housing.

“Affordable housing and workforce housing is an issue in Charlotte County, Sarasota County, Florida and the entire country,” he said. “People need someone where to live in order to work here.”

CCED has been holding workshops with the county’s large employers like hospitals, the school district, Cheney Brothers and the sheriff’s office.

== Education ==
Florida SouthWestern State College maintains a campus in the county. Southern Technical College operates a campus in the county. Charlotte County Public Schools administers all public schools from kindergarten through twelfth grade.

Western Michigan University operated a regional location in the county until August 2019 when they closed the school. AeroGuard Flight Training Center opened a flight school at the airport. The Airframe and Power Plant Program offered through Charlotte Technical College also operates at the airport.

== Library ==
The Charlotte County Library System consists of 4 library branches.

- Port Charlotte Public Library
- Punta Gorda Public Library
- Englewood Charlotte Public Library
- Mid-County Regional Library

The erection of the first library was in 1963. In 1976, Charlotte County and Glades County joined to make the Charlotte-Glades Library System. One reason the counties paired together was due to the additional $50,000 in state aid to libraries who join to serve the public. Charlotte County was financially responsible in the relationship. In 2008 the two counties separated and reverted to providing services to residents and visitors of their own communities. The newest addition to the library system was an expansion to the Englewood Branch; the new building created is an additional 6,500 square feet. This provides more space for the youth services department, a new computer lab, and an archives run by the historical department. The Mid-County Regional Library suffered heavy damage due the impact of Hurricane Ian in 2022. It had to close as a result, but is expected to re-open in 2026.

== Communities ==
=== City ===
- Punta Gorda

=== Census-designated places (unincorporated) ===
- Charlotte Harbor
- Charlotte Park
- Cleveland
- Englewood (part)
- Grove City
- Harbour Heights
- Manasota Key
- Rotonda West (under the name Rotonda)
- Port Charlotte
- Solana

=== Other unincorporated communities ===
- Babcock Ranch, a solar-powered community currently under construction.
- Boca Grande (part)
- Cape Haze
- Deep Creek
- Don Pedro Island, an island located north of Little Gasparilla Island.
- Little Gasparilla Island
- Murdock
- Placida
- West Port Charlotte

== Transportation ==
=== Airport ===
- Punta Gorda Airport (Florida)

=== Major highways ===
- Interstate 75
- U.S. Route 17
- U.S. Route 41
- State Road 31
- State Road 776

== See also ==
- National Register of Historic Places listings in Charlotte County, Florida
- Southwest Florida
