= Stephen R. Deutsch =

Rhode Island politician

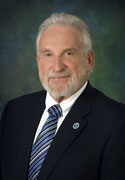

Rhode Island Senate
- In office June 21, 1983 – June 1988

Member of the Rhode Island House of Representatives from Rhode Island
- In office 1980–1983

Personal details
- Born: New York City, U.S.
- Party: Republican
- Education: Wagner College (B.S.); Springfield College (M. Ed.); University of Rhode Island (M.A.)
- Occupation: Real estate broker

Stephen R. Deutsch is a current member of the Charlotte County Board of County Commissioners in Port Charlotte, Florida and former member of the Rhode Island Senate and Rhode Island House of Representatives. He is a veteran of the United States Coast Guard and has worked as a city planner, real estate developer, and a youth director.

== History ==
Stephen R. Deutsch was born in New York City. He enlisted in the United States Coast Guard in 1957 at age 17 and was honorably discharged in 1963. He attended Wagner College where he graduated with a B.S. in economics and business administration, with a minor in education in 1965. He served as a YMCA youth director from 1965 to 1969. He attended Springfield College where he graduated in 1969 with an M.Ed. in community leadership and development. He served as a planning supervisor from 1969 to 1971 and a consultant from 1971 to 1973. In 1972, he graduated from the University of Rhode Island with an M.A. in counseling and guidance. He held director positions for various organizations and agencies in the northeast from 1973 to 1988 when he founded real estate companies SRD Inc., and SRD Realty in Warwick, Rhode Island, which he operated before moving to Port Charlotte in 2004. He has held numerous part time and volunteer positions in churches, educational institutions, and non-profit organizations in both the northeast and Florida.

=== Political career ===
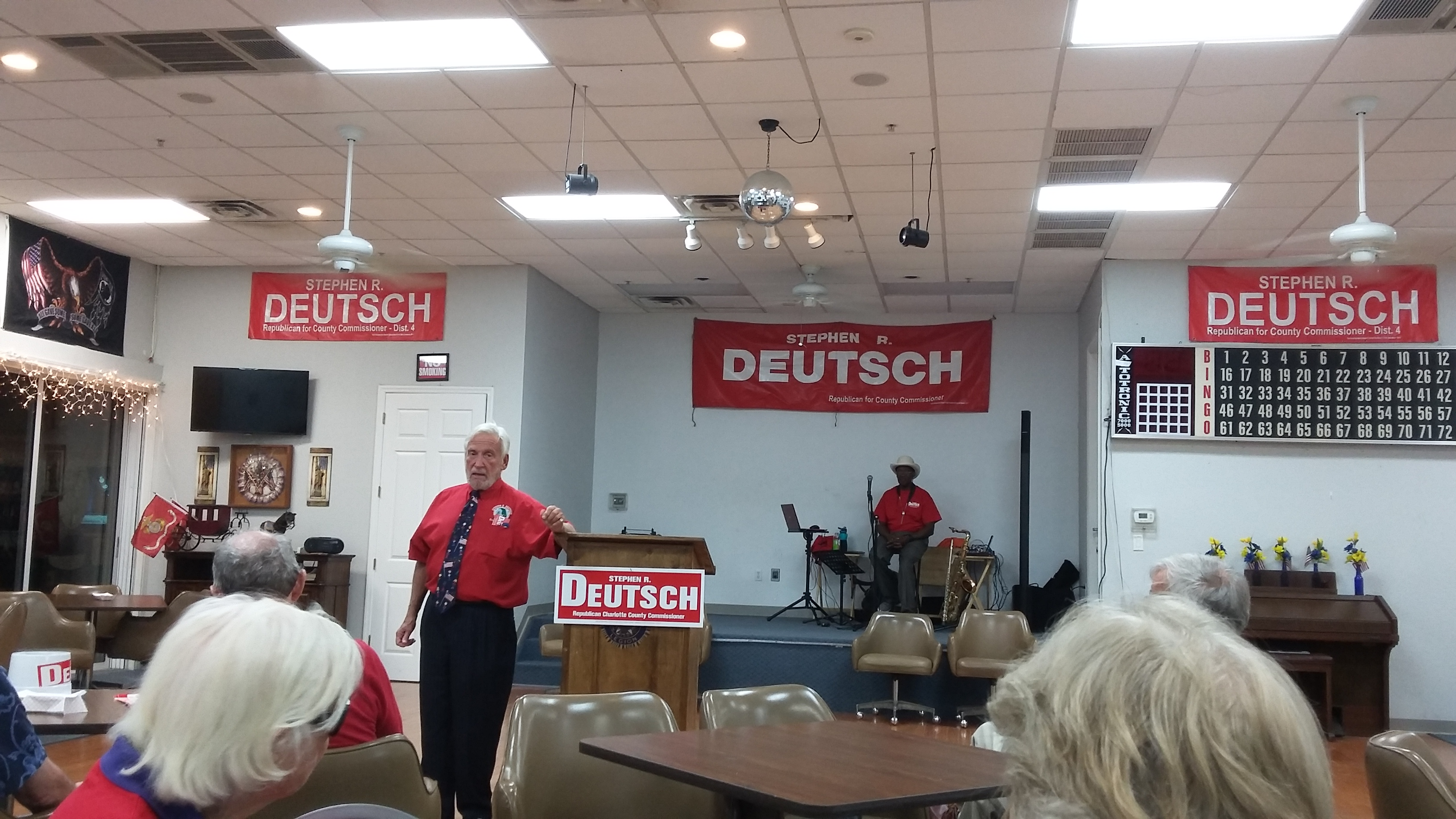
Senator Deutsch during a county commission campaign event in Florida

Stephen R. Deutsch is a lifelong member of the Republican Party. He was elected to the East Greenwich Town Counsel in 1978, then elected to the Rhode Island House of Representatives in 1980. He was re-elected in 1982 and became the Deputy Minority Leader. He was elected to the Rhode Island Senate in 1983 where he also served as the Deputy Minority Leader. He continued to serve in the Rhode Island Senate throughout the 1980s, with his final term ending in 1988. He made an unsuccessful bid for Lieutenant Governor of Rhode Island in 1990. He was elected to the Charlotte County Board of County Commissioners in 2010 and successfully sought re-election in 2014, 2018, and 2022.
