= Deep Creek, Florida =

- Unincorporated community
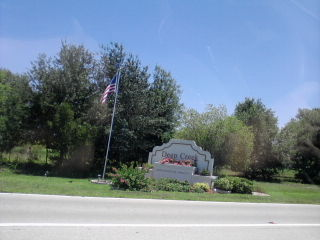
- Deep Creek sign
- Interactive map of Deep Creek, Florida
- Coordinates: 27°01′05″N 82°00′20″W
- Country: United States
- State: Florida
- County: Charlotte
- Elevation: 23 ft (7.0 m)
- Time zone: UTC-5 (Eastern (EST))
  - Summer (DST): UTC-4 (EDT)
- ZIP code: 33983
- Area code: 941
- GNIS feature ID: 2035736

Deep Creek is a deed restricted unincorporated community in Charlotte County, Florida, United States. It lies 5.5 miles (8.9 km) East of Port Charlotte. The community is part of the Sarasota-Bradenton-Punta Gorda Combined Statistical Area. Deep Creek is served by utilities of both Punta Gorda and Port Charlotte. Deep Creek's mail is processed at the Punta Gorda post office, but telephone numbers in the area are registered as Port Charlotte.

== Public education ==
Public K-12 education is provided by Charlotte County Public Schools Traditionally, elementary school students in the area attended Deep Creek Elementary School, middle school students attended Punta Gorda Middle School, and high school students attended Charlotte High School, but some families opt to send their children to charter schools or other traditional schools through school choice.
