= Blanchard House Museum =

Museum in Charlotte County, Florida

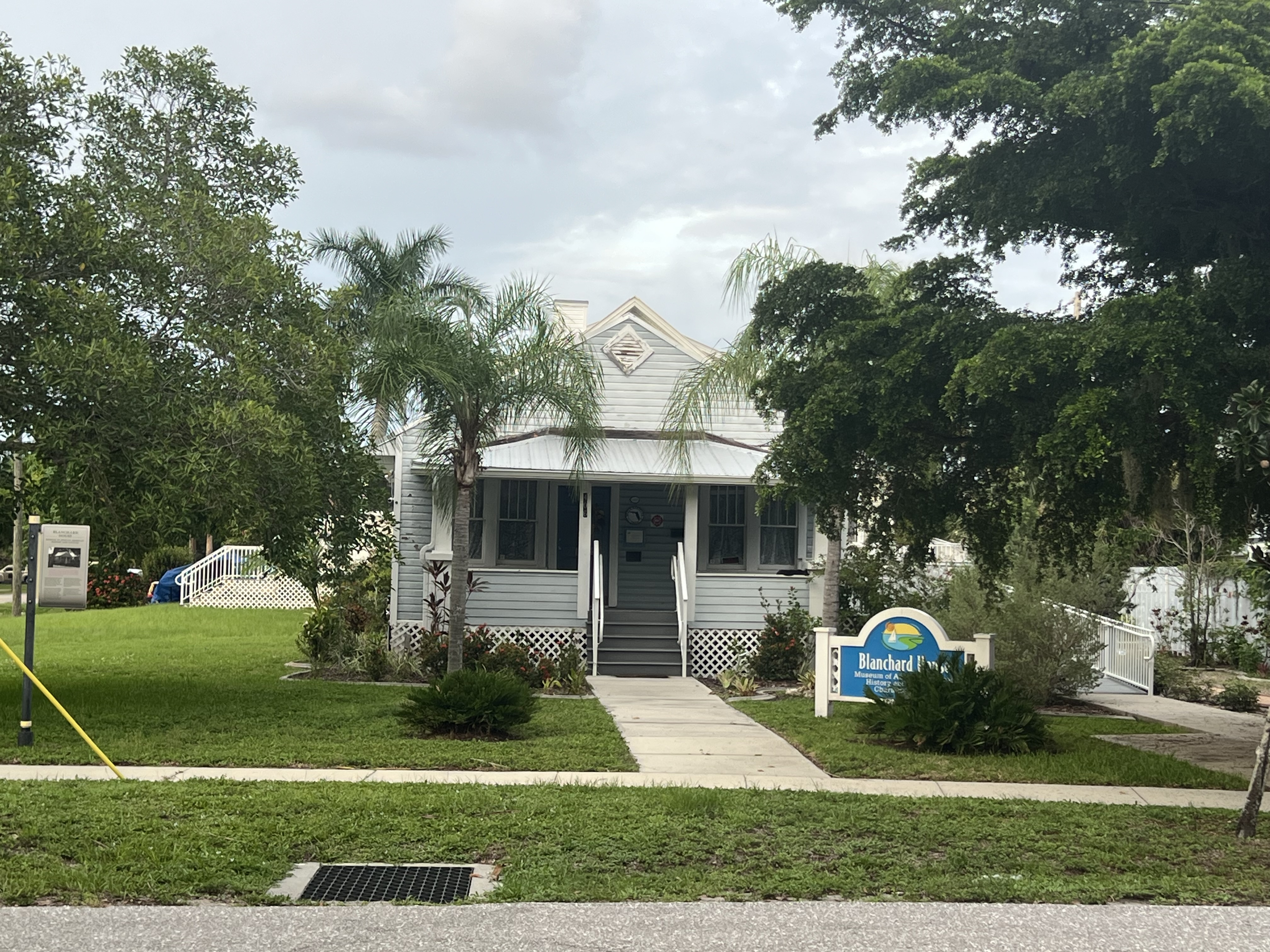
- Former name: Blanchard House Museum of African History and Culture
- Established: 2004
- Location: 406 Dr. Martin Luther King Jr. Boulevard, Punta Gorda, Charlotte County, Florida, U.S.
- Coordinates: 26.9362°N 82.0439°W
- Type: African American history museum
- Founders: Bernice Andrew Russell, Martha Bireda
- Director: Martha Bireda
- Website: www.blanchardhousemuseum.org

The Blanchard House Museum is an African-American history museum in a historic former home in Punta Gorda, Charlotte County, Florida. It specializes in African-American history of Charlotte County and Southwest Florida.

== About ==
Exhibits at the museum cover the African American and cultural history of Charlotte County, including political, civic and religious life; founding families; education; and the Civil Rights Movement. Artifacts on display include photos, newspaper clippings, family heirlooms, and books by black writers. The Blanchard House and Museum also serves as a community center, and its offerings include a book club, seminars on African American history and culture, and leadership classes.

The museum director is Martha Bireda.

== History ==
African Americans have played a significant role in Punta Gorda's history. About half of the city's founder were Black; and four Black people signed the papers incorporating the city, out of a group of 34 men. Almost half of the city's 15 original settlers were Black, according to a press release from the Charlotte Harbor and The Gulf Islands Visitors Bureau.

The building was named the Blanchard House and was constructed on Fitzhugh Avenue in 1925 by Joseph Blanchard, a former steamboat pilot. The Blanchard family retained ownership of the home until 1997, when it was purchased by local resident Bernice A. Russell. Russell intended to found a local Black history museum in the structure, but died in 1999. Russell's heirs donated the building to the Bernice A. Russell Community Development Corporation. In 2002, the house was moved from Fitzhugh Avenue to Martin Luther King Jr. Blvd. The location is the site of the long-demolished Gollman's Bar, a jook joint. The bar catered to Blacks and featured blues music, and was one of the few places where local African Americans could socialize publicly.

The Blanchard House Museum opened in 2004, the founder is Bernice Andrew Russell (1923–1999). Russell had established a traveling exhibition on African American history in the 1980s and was displayed at Punta Gorda Railroad Depot's Segregated Waiting Room, followed by a 1997 purchase of the Blanchard House with the intention of opening a museum.

The building was badly damaged by Hurricane Charley shortly after its openly, and did not reopen until February 2006. It was again closed due to damaged by Hurricane Ian in 2022.

In 2024, it was included on the Florida Trust for Historic Preservation 11 to Save list.
