= Charlotte County Courthouse =

Charlotte County Courthouse may refer to:

- Charlotte County Court House, St. Andrews, New Brunswick, Canada
- Charlotte County Courthouse (Virginia), listed on the NRHP in Virginia
- Old Charlotte County Courthouse, Punta Gorda, Florida, United States
