= Hurricane Charley =

Category 4 Atlantic hurricane in 2004

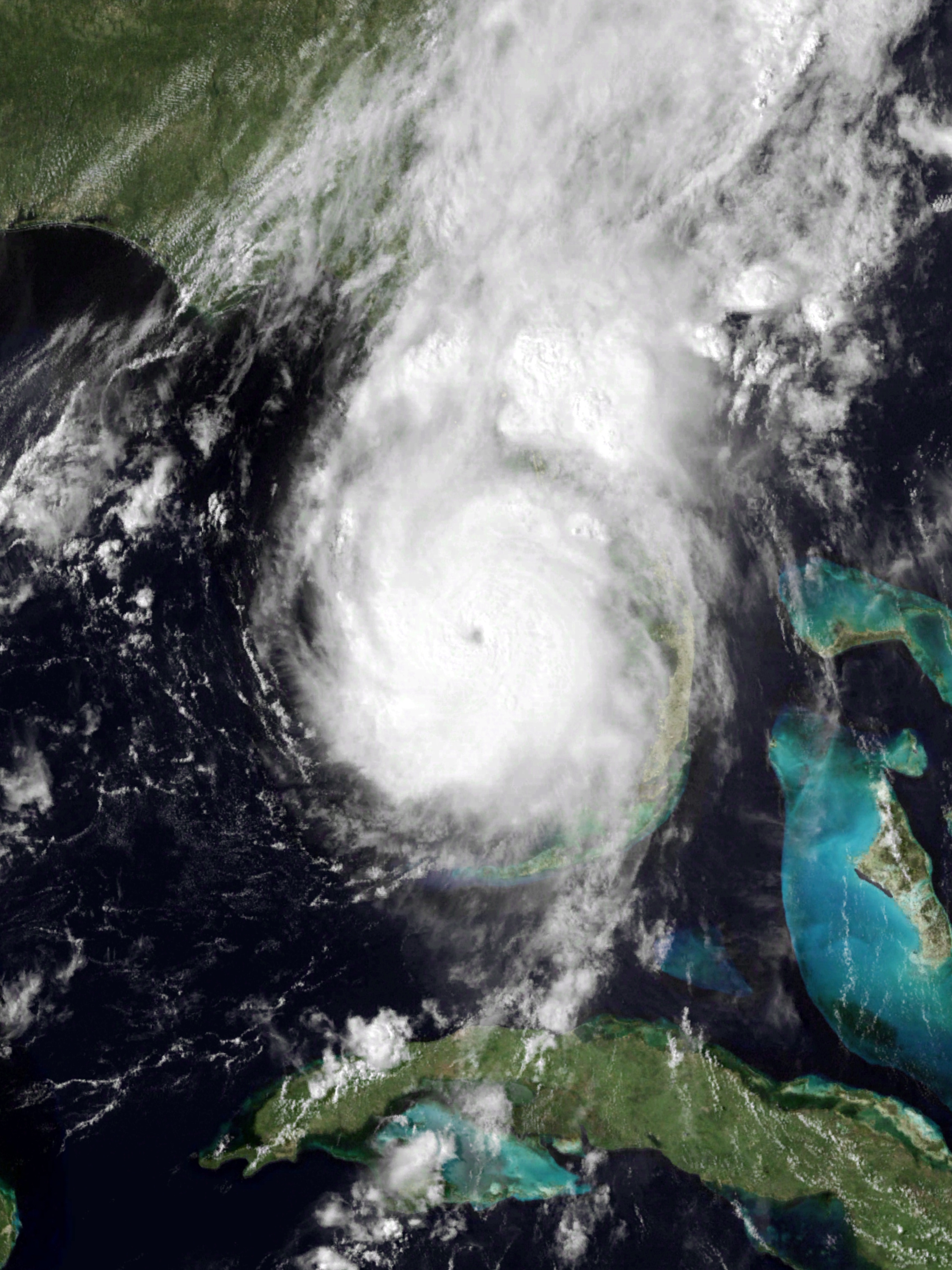
- Hurricane Charley making landfall in Florida at peak intensity on August 13

Meteorological history
- Formed: August 9, 2004
- Extratropical: August 14, 2004
- Dissipated: August 15, 2004

Category 4 major hurricane
- 1-minute sustained (SSHWS/NWS)
- Highest winds: 150 mph (240 km/h)
- Lowest pressure: 941 mbar (hPa); 27.79 inHg

Overall effects
- Fatalities: 35 total
- Damage: $16.9 billion (2004 USD)
- Areas affected: Jamaica; Cayman Islands; Cuba; East Coast of the United States
- IBTrACS
- Part of the 2004 Atlantic hurricane season

Hurricane Charley was the first of four separate hurricanes to impact or strike Florida during 2004, along with Frances, Ivan and Jeanne, as well as one of the strongest hurricanes ever to strike the United States. It was the third named storm, the second hurricane, and the second major hurricane of the 2004 Atlantic hurricane season. Charley lasted from August 9 to 15, and at its peak intensity it attained 150 mph (240 km/h) winds, making it a strong Category 4 hurricane on the Saffir–Simpson scale. It made landfall in Southwest Florida at maximum strength, becoming the strongest hurricane to hit the United States since Hurricane Andrew struck Florida in 1992 and tied with Hurricane Ian as the strongest hurricane to hit southwest Florida in recorded history.

After moving slowly through the Caribbean, Charley crossed Cuba on Friday, August 13, as a Category 3 hurricane, causing heavy damage and four deaths. That same day, it crossed over the Dry Tortugas, just 22 hours after Tropical Storm Bonnie had struck northwestern Florida. It was the first time in history that two tropical cyclones struck the same state within a 24-hour period. At its peak intensity of 150 mph (240 km/h), Hurricane Charley struck the northern tip of Captiva Island and the southern tip of North Captiva Island, before crossing over Bokeelia causing severe damage. Charley then continued to produce severe damage as it made landfall on the peninsula in Punta Gorda. It continued to the north-northeast along the Peace River corridor, devastating Punta Gorda, Port Charlotte, Cleveland, Fort Ogden, Nocatee, Arcadia, Zolfo Springs, Sebring, Lake Placid, and Wauchula. Zolfo Springs was isolated for nearly two days as large trees, power poles, power lines, transformers, and debris filled the streets. Wauchula sustained gusts to 147 mph (237 km/h); buildings in the downtown areas caved onto Main Street.

The storm passed through the central and eastern parts of the Orlando metropolitan area, carrying winds gusting up to 106 mph (171 km/h). The city of Winter Park, north of Orlando, also sustained considerable damage since its many old, large oak trees had not experienced high winds. Falling trees tore down power utilities and smashed cars, and their huge roots lifted underground water and sewer utilities. The storm slowed as it exited the state over Ormond Beach just north of Daytona Beach. The storm was absorbed by a front in the Atlantic Ocean shortly after sunrise on August 15, near southeastern Massachusetts.

Charley was initially expected to hit further north in Tampa and caught many Floridians off-guard due to the storm turning toward the Florida peninsula sooner than anticipated, within six hours before landfall. Along its path, Charley caused 10 deaths and $16.9 billion in damage to insured residential property, making it the second costliest hurricane in United States history at the time. Charley was a compact, fast-moving storm, which limited the scope and severity of the damage.

== Meteorological history ==
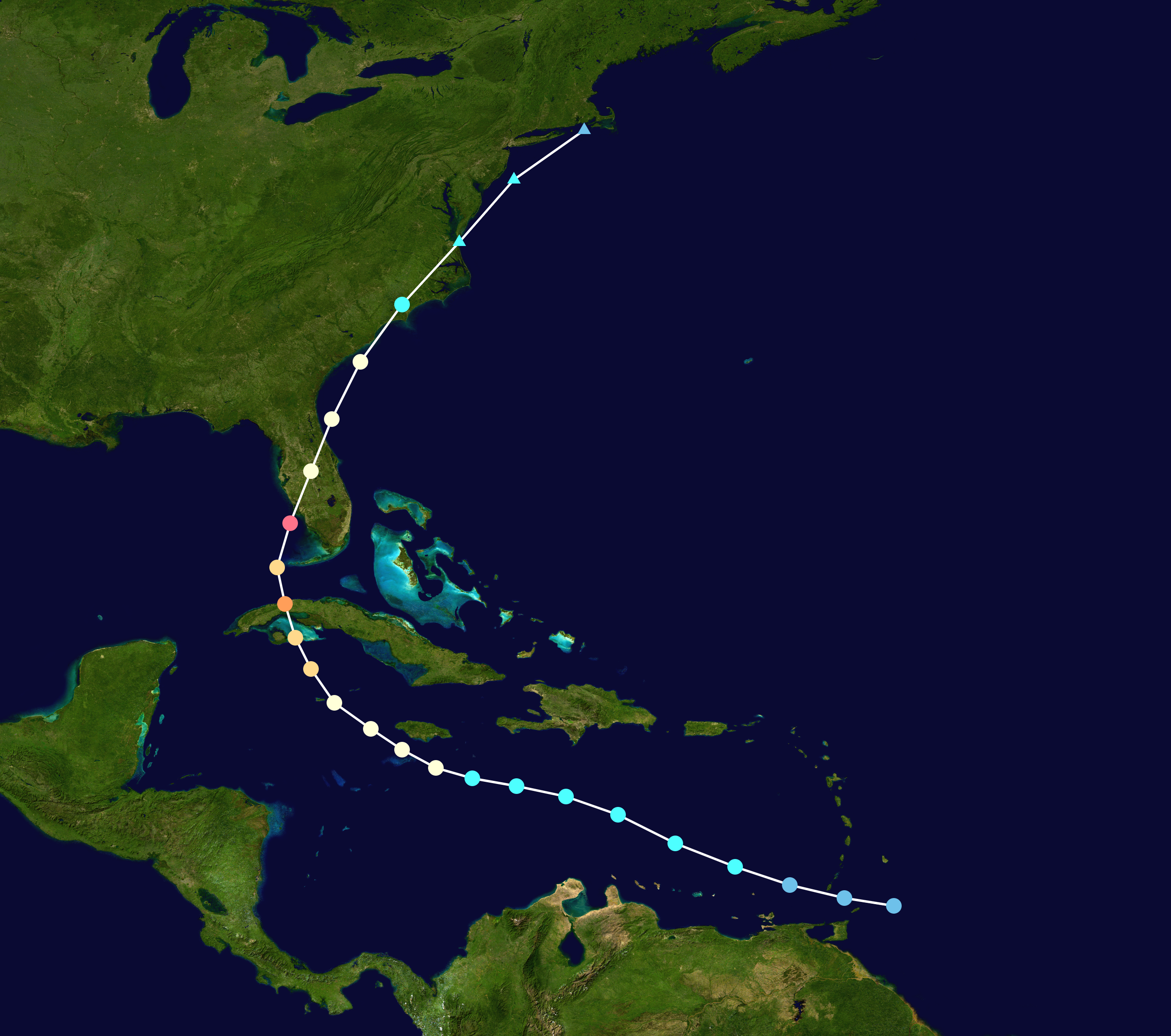
Map plotting the storm's track and intensity, according to the Saffir–Simpson scale Map key Saffir–Simpson scale Tropical depression (≤38 mph, ≤62 km/h) Tropical storm (39–73 mph, 63–118 km/h) Category 1 (74–95 mph, 119–153 km/h) Category 2 (96–110 mph, 154–177 km/h) Category 3 (111–129 mph, 178–208 km/h) Category 4 (130–156 mph, 209–251 km/h) Category 5 (≥157 mph, ≥252 km/h) Unknown Storm type Tropical cyclone Subtropical cyclone Extratropical cyclone, remnant low, tropical disturbance, or monsoon depression

Charley began as a tropical wave that moved off the west coast of Africa on August 4. It moved quickly westward and steadily organized over the open Atlantic Ocean, with convection developing in curved bands. The wave continued to develop as it approached the Lesser Antilles, and became Tropical Depression Three on August 9 about 115 miles (185 km) south-southeast of Barbados, near the island of Grenada. Low upper-level wind shear and well-defined outflow contributed to further intensification, and the depression strengthened on August 10, despite being located in the eastern Caribbean, which is an area not particularly suited to tropical cyclogenesis. At this time, the National Hurricane Center in Miami designated the name Charley.

A strong ridge of high pressure to the system's north forced Charley to change track quickly to the west-northwest. It continued to strengthen and became a Category 1 hurricane on August 11, about 90 mi (140 km) south of Kingston, Jamaica. The storm was being steered around the periphery of the high pressure area, and as a result, Charley changed direction toward the northwest. The following day, the core passed 40 mi (64 km) southwest of Jamaica, affecting the island on August 11 and 12. The storm then passed 15 mi (24 km) northeast of Grand Cayman, reaching Category 2 status just after passing the island. The hurricane continued to strengthen as it turned to the northwest and rounded the southwest portion of the subtropical ridge, becoming a major hurricane—a storm classified as a Category 3 hurricane or higher—just before making landfall on southern Cuba. Charley came ashore near Punta Cayamas with maximum sustained winds of 120 mph (190 km/h) and gusts of up to 133 mph (214 km/h), at about 0430 UTC on August 13. It crossed the island, passing about 15 mi (24 km) west of downtown Havana before weakening to 110 mph (180 km/h).

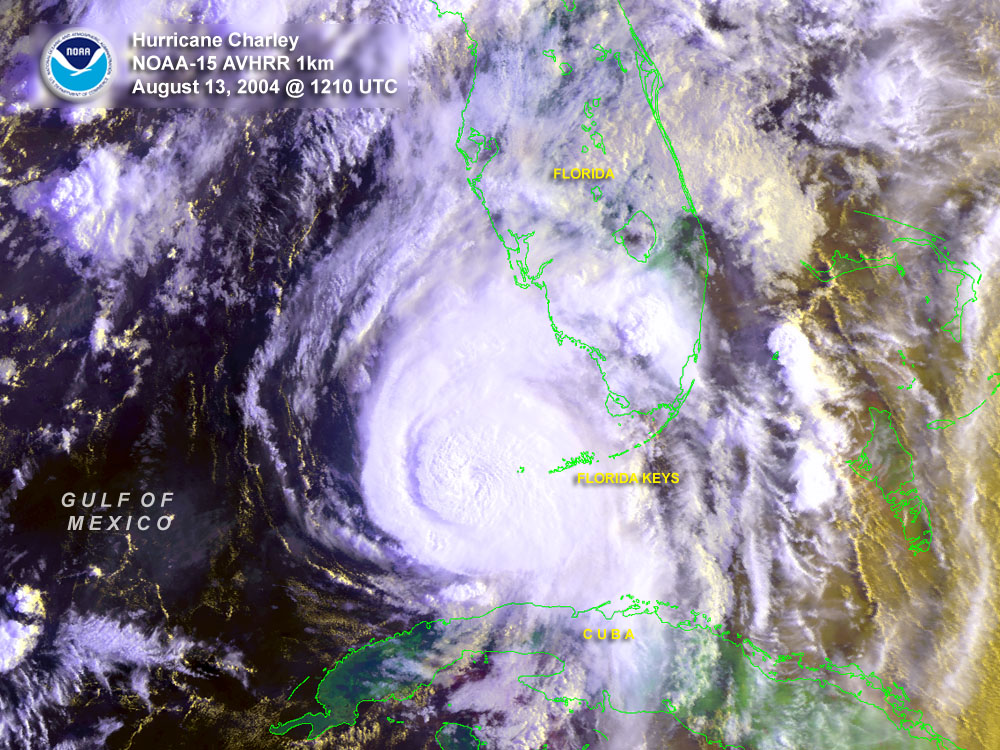
Hurricane Charley intensifying while approaching Florida on August 13

After crossing Cuba near Menelao Mora, Hurricane Charley accelerated to the north-northeast, toward the southwest coast of Florida in response to the approach of an unseasonal mid-tropospheric trough. Charley passed over the Dry Tortugas at 1200 UTC on August 13, with maximum winds of about 110 mph (175 km/h). The strike occurred only 22 hours after Tropical Storm Bonnie made landfall on St. Vincent Island, marking the first time two tropical cyclones hit the same state within a 24-hour period. Charley then explosively intensified, strengthening from a 110 mph (175 km/h) hurricane with a minimum central barometric pressure of 965 mbar (965 hPa; 28.5 inHg) to a 145 mph (235 km/h) hurricane with a pressure of 947 mbar (947 hPa; 28.0 inHg) in just three hours. It continued to strengthen as it turned more to the northeast, and made landfall near the island of Cayo Costa, Florida as a 150 mph (240 km/h) Category 4 hurricane with a pressure of 941 mbar (941 hPa; 27.8 inHg) at approximately 1945 UTC on August 13. An hour later, the hurricane struck Punta Gorda as a 145 mph (235 km/h) storm and then passed up through Port Charlotte and the Charlotte Harbor. The eye had shrunk before landfall, limiting the most powerful winds to an area within 7 mi (11 km) of the center.

Charley weakened considerably due to its passage over land, but still retained sustained winds of about 85 mph (135 km/h) as it passed directly over Orlando between 0020 and 0140 UTC August 14; gusts of up to 106 mph (171 km/h) were recorded at Orlando International Airport. It cut a swath of destruction across Florida, also passing near Kissimmee. The hurricane reemerged into the Atlantic Ocean after crossing directly over New Smyrna Beach as a Category 1 hurricane, but restrengthened slightly over open waters. Continuing to move rapidly to the north-northeast, Charley struck near Cape Romain National Wildlife Refuge, South Carolina as an 80 mph (130 km/h) hurricane, moved offshore briefly, and made its final landfall near North Myrtle Beach as a minimal hurricane, with winds of 75 mph (120 km/h). Charley then began interacting with an approaching frontal boundary, becoming a tropical storm over southeastern North Carolina. After moving back into the Atlantic Ocean near Virginia Beach on August 15, the storm became extratropical and became embedded in the frontal zone. The extratropical storm continued to move rapidly to the northeast, and was completely absorbed by the front shortly after sunrise on August 15, near southeastern Massachusetts.

== Preparations ==
=== Caribbean ===
==== Jamaica ====
On August 10, the National Hurricane Center (NHC), based in Miami, Florida, issued a tropical storm watch for the entire island of Jamaica as Tropical Storm Charley intensified over the eastern Caribbean. Later that day, the watch was upgraded to a warning as the storm quickly approached the island. Early on August 11, a hurricane watch was declared for the island as Charley neared hurricane intensity. Late on August 11, all watches and warnings for Jamaica were changed to hurricane warnings as Charley attained Category 1 status on the Saffir–Simpson scale. The warning was later discontinued on August 12 as Hurricane Charley tracked towards Cuba, no longer a threat to Jamaica.

Following the issuance of hurricane watches, Robert Pickersgill, Minister of Transport and Works in Jamaica closed both airports, Norman Manley International Airport and Sangster International Airport, on the island and shut down all ports. A total of 33 flights were canceled or delayed by the storm. Roughly 3,000 passengers from the Carnival Conquest cruise ship were diverted from their scheduled arrival in Montego Bay, resulting in millions of dollars in losses. Another cruise ship, The Triumph, carrying 2,700 passengers was also diverted. Most businesses on the island were closed on August 12. Emergency shelters were set up across the island ahead of the storm; however, press reports indicate that no one sought refuge in shelters. Residents along the coast were urged to evacuate by the Office of Disaster Preparedness and Emergency Management due to the risk of storm surge and large swells that could inundate low-lying communities. Up to 6 in (150 mm) of rain fell in eastern portions of the island, triggering mudslides.

On August 11, the Jamaica Red Cross opened its Emergency Operations Center in preparation for Hurricane Charley and placed the warning level at one, the lowest warning level. Residents throughout the country stocked up on emergency supplies and non-perishable food, noted by an increase in sales at shops. In Saint James Parish, emergency officials activated all necessary agencies by August 11. Late on August 11, emergency officials quickly opened 50 shelters in the parish. In Saint Elizabeth Parish, 100 residents sought refuge in the six shelters opened throughout the parish. A total of $1.5 million (JMD; US$17,000) was allocated by the Ministry of Local Government for repairs after the storm. The Jamaica Red Cross alerted local branches to be prepared as Charley approached.

==== Other areas ====
Cuban government officials issued a hurricane watch for the southern coastline on August 11, two days before the hurricane struck the island. This was upgraded to a hurricane warning on the 12th, 13 ½ hours before Charley made landfall. Because of the threat, the government issued a mandatory evacuation for 235,000 citizens and 159,000 animals in the area of the expected impact. An additional 3,800 residents were evacuated from offshore islands, while 47,000 in Havana were transported from old, unsafe buildings to safer areas. The people were transported to shelters provisioned with supplies. In addition, the power grid in southern Cuba was turned off to avoid accidents.

The Cayman Islands issued a hurricane warning on August 11, a day before the hurricane passed near the archipelago.

=== United States ===
==== Florida ====
Charley making landfall on August 13, 2004

On August 11, Florida governor Jeb Bush issued a state of emergency declaration due to the impending threat Charley presented to the state while the storm was still located south of Jamaica. The National Hurricane Center issued hurricane warnings for the Florida Keys and from Cape Sable to the mouth of the Suwannee River a day prior to Charley's passage through the state, while tropical storm warnings were issued elsewhere throughout Florida. Because of the threat, 1.9 million people along the Florida west coast were urged to evacuate, including 380,000 residents in the Tampa Bay area, and 11,000 in the Florida Keys. It was the largest evacuation order for Pinellas County history, and the largest evacuation request in Florida since Hurricane Floyd five years before. Many Floridians remained despite the evacuation order, as authorities estimated that up to a million people would not go to shelters; instead, these residents boarded up their homes and bought supplies to ride out the storm. However, about 1.42 million people evacuated their homes in Florida, and approximately 50,000 residents were placed in shelters throughout the state. Power companies mobilized workers to prepare for the expected widespread power outages. MacDill Air Force Base, home of U.S. Central Command (USCENTCOM) and the U.S. military center for the Iraq War, severely limited its staff on base, shifting most of its operations to its forward headquarters in Doha, Qatar. Similarly, Kennedy Space Center, which usually counts with 13,000 on-site personnel, reduced its staff to only 200 people in preparation for the hurricane, and secured all Space Shuttles by sealing them in their hangars. Many amusement parks in the Orlando area closed early, and Walt Disney World's Animal Kingdom remained closed. This was only the second time in history that a Disney park was closed due to a hurricane, with the other occurrence being after Hurricane Floyd. The approaching hurricane also forced several cruise ships to reroute their paths, and forced rail service between Miami and New York to shut down.

The rapid strengthening of Charley in the eastern Gulf of Mexico caught many by surprise. Around five hours before its Florida landfall, Charley was a strong Category 2 hurricane predicted to strengthen its strongest winds to 115 mph (185 km/h) upon its landfall in the Tampa–Saint Petersburg area. About two hours before landfall, the National Hurricane Center issued a special advisory, notifying the public that Charley had become a 145 mph (235 km/h) Category 4 hurricane, with a predicted landfall location in the Port Charlotte area. As a result of this change in forecast, numerous people in the Charlotte County area were unprepared for the hurricane, although the new track prediction was well within the previous forecast's margin of error. National Hurricane Center marine forecaster Robbie Berg publicly blamed the media for misleading residents into believing that a Tampa landfall was inevitable. He also stated that residents of Port Charlotte had ample warning, as a hurricane warning had been issued for the landfall area 23 hours before, and a hurricane watch had existed for 35 hours.

Several local meteorologists, however, did depart from the official predictions of a Tampa Bay landfall as early as the morning of August 13. Jim Farrell of WINK, Robert Van Winkle WBBH, Steve Jerve of WFLA in Tampa, Jim Reif of WZVN in Fort Myers, and Tom Terry of WFTV in Orlando all broke with their national news forecasts and stated at around 1500 UTC that Charley was going to turn early, striking around Charlotte Harbor and traveling over Orlando, as would prove to be the case.

==== North Carolina ====
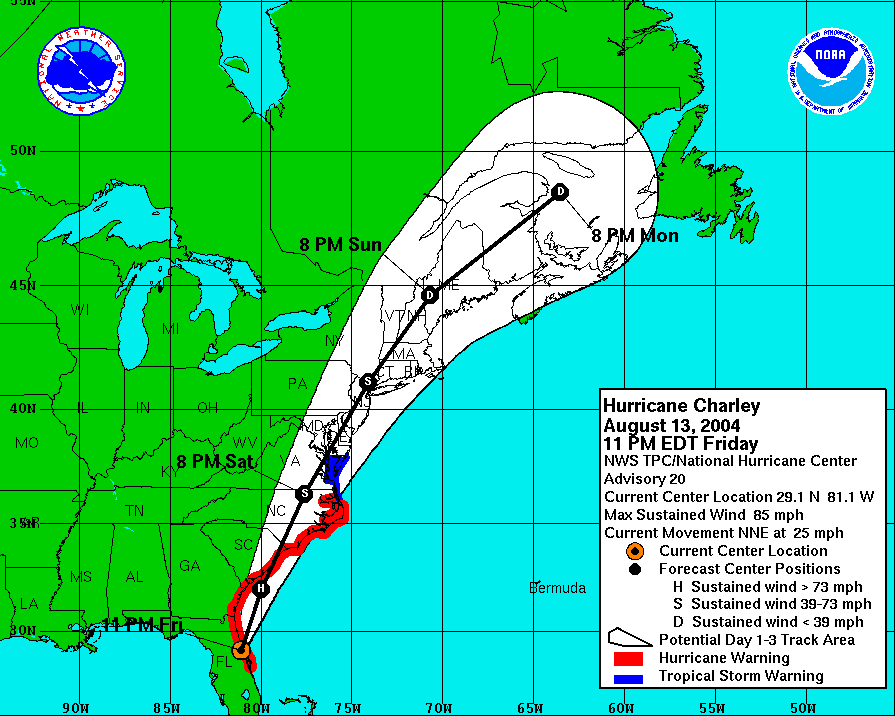
Hurricane Charley 5-day forecast map on August 13, 2004

On August 13, 2004, a tropical storm watch was issued for Cape Fear, southward to South Carolina. The watch was extended northward to Oregon Inlet later that day; the watch further extended to Chincoteague, Virginia. The tropical storm watch from Cape Lookout to Oregon Inlet was changed to a hurricane warning. A hurricane watch was subsequently put into effect for coastal areas from Oregon Inlet to the North Carolina/Virginia border, although by August 15 all advisories were discontinued. Flood watches were also placed into effect for portions of the state.

Governor Mike Easley declared a state of emergency in advance of the storm, and 200 National Guard troops were dispatched to Charlotte, Raleigh, Kinston and Lumberton, while 800 more were on standby. On Ocracoke Island, authorities ordered mandatory evacuations, while on Bogue Banks voluntary evacuations were in place. Officials in Wrightsville Beach drove along the streets with loudspeakers mounted on trucks, warning tourists that a storm was approaching. The storm forced the University of North Carolina at Wilmington to suspend a planned opening for students moving into residence halls. Campgrounds at the Cape Hatteras National Seashore were closed by the National Park Service and three boat ramps were closed. Duke Power Co. prepared for Charley by lowering the level of hydroelectric lakes to make room for excessive rainfall. The state Department of Environment and Natural Resources advised hog farmers to pump out their waste lagoon. About 60 Red Cross shelters were opened during the storm and during the peak of Charley, and roughly 1,600 people sought protection.

==== South Carolina ====
Prior to the storm, a tropical storm watch was issued for locations from the Altamaha sound, Georgia to the South Santee River on August 12. The next day, the watch was upgraded to a hurricane watch from the Altamaha sound to the South Carolina–Georgia border. As Charley approached the region, a hurricane warning was issued for the entire area. A tornado watch was issued eastward from a line extending from Aiken to Lancaster County.

Governor Mark Sanford declared a state of emergency as Charley approached landfall and issued a mandatory evacuation for residents on barrier islands and in coastal locations in counties Georgetown and Horry. In Georgetown County, this order was focused on residents and tourists east of U.S. Route 17, likewise for Horry County. 180,000 people evacuated the Grand Strand. Drawbridges in Beaufort and Charleston Counties were shut down, and bridges in Georgetown and Horry Counties were locked down. Hampton County requested 2,000 sandbags, that were provided by the Department of Corrections. The Wateree Correctional Institution also filled 30,000 sandbags for potential floods. State troopers directed traffic inland from Myrtle Beach. U.S. Route 501 used a lane reversal to allow for evacuations.

==== Other areas ====
Following the Florida landfall, Georgia Governor Sonny Perdue declared a state of emergency as a precaution against a 4–7 ft (1.2–2.1 m) storm surge and price gouging.

== Impact ==
Storm deaths by region
Region	Direct	Indirect	Total
Jamaica	1	0	1
Cuba	4	0	4
United States	10	20	30
Total	15	20	35

One death in Jamaica, four deaths in Cuba, and ten deaths in the United States were directly attributed to Charley. Numerous injuries were reported, as well as 25 indirect deaths in the U.S.

Property damage from Charley in the United States was estimated by the NHC to be $16 billion. At the time, this figure made Charley the second costliest hurricane in United States history, behind 1992's Hurricane Andrew's $27.3 billion.

=== Caribbean ===
==== Jamaica ====
On August 11, a 60 ft (18 m) yacht carrying three people was disabled roughly 58 mi (93 km) southeast of the Morant Cays. The Jamaica Defence Force Coast Guard rescued the crew members the following day and brought them to Kingston Public Hospital as they were severely dehydrated and exhausted. During the preparations, storms ahead of the hurricane knocked out power in isolated areas. After nearly completing restoration of the initial power outage, lightning struck a power line and left more residents without electricity.

The community of Big Woods was significantly affected by flooding, with 30 families being isolated in the area. The only fatality from the storm also occurred in this community after a man was washed away while trying to rescue a family. The severity of damage in Big Woods prompted Jamaica Labour Party Area Council Four chairman to state that it should be declared a disaster area. Torrential rains during a two-hour span overnight triggered most of the flooding in the area, isolating many homes and inundating several. In Westmoreland Parish, severe flooding inundated several homes and damaged roadways. One home sustained significant damage after a large tree fell on it. In Kingston, high winds damaged power lines and some homes. Water supply to most regions was cut due to damage to pipelines and high water turbidity. Widespread power outages occurred due to numerous downed trees and power lines.

The banana industry sustained severe losses, with trees downed and fruit damaged and numerous livestock drowned in flood waters. Initial assessments of agricultural losses from the storm reached $300 million (JMD; US$3.4 million). Residents requested the government for immediate assistance as families were without a source of food and income. Official assessments in four parishes placed the damage to agriculture and livestock at $88.4 million (JMD; US$1 million), with roughly $73.5 million (JMD; US$835,000) of this accounting for 750 farmers in Saint Elizabeth.

Roads in Saint Elizabeth sustained substantial damage, with 32 separate roads experiencing severe impacts. Throughout the country, a total of $7.6 million (JMD; US$86,000) was provided to repair the roads, $4.23 million (JMD; US$48,000) of which was used in Saint Elizabeth alone. Widespread damage to crops also resulted in an increased price in store costs. The loss to farmers was untimely as it followed a three-month drought that was preceded by damaging hailstorms that ruined crops. Following the storm, search and rescue teams were deployed, mainly in Saint Elizabeth Parish following reports of flooding. Throughout the country, Charley caused $4.1 million in damage and one fatality.

==== Cuba ====
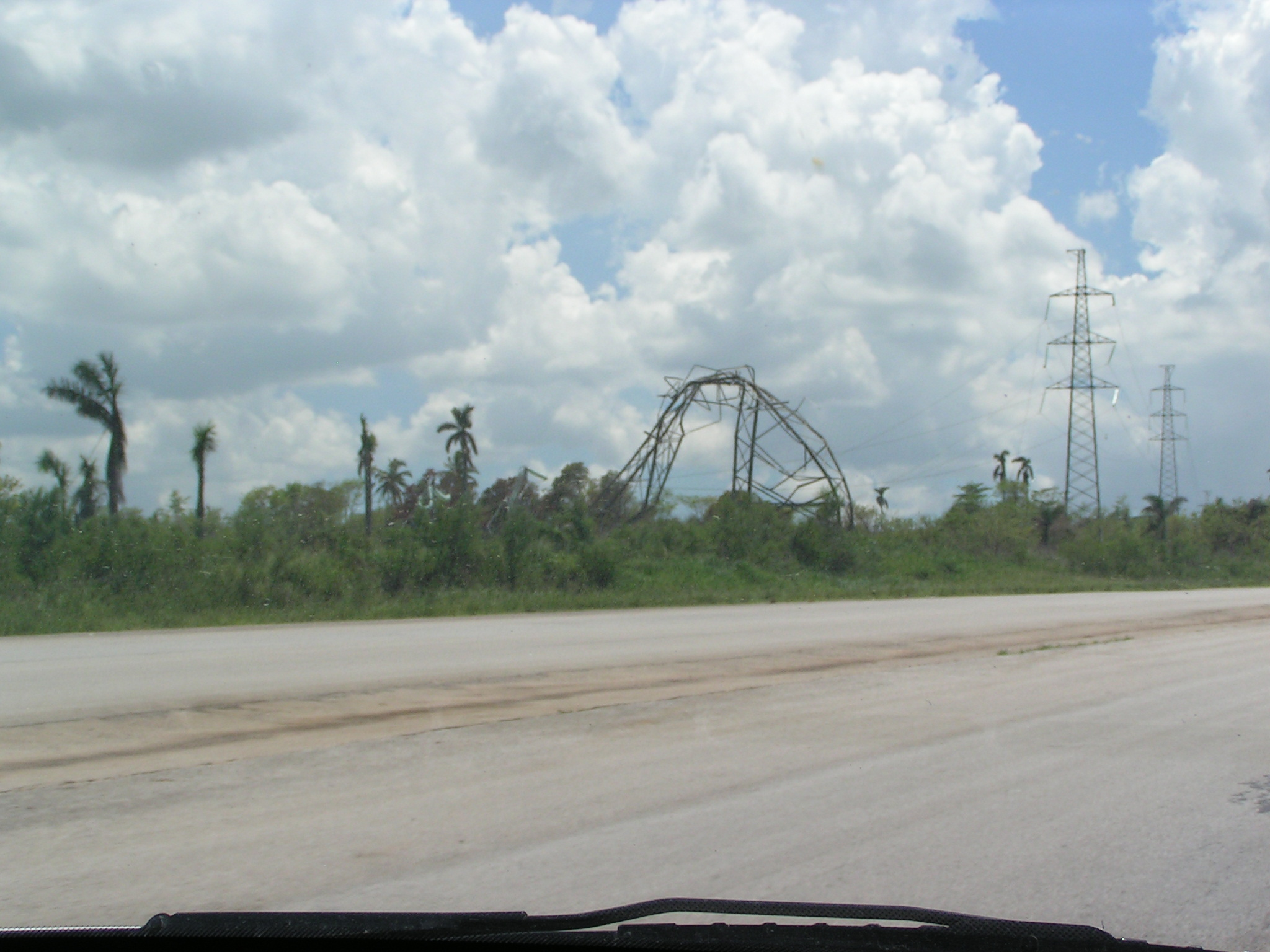
Powerline in Cuba damaged by Hurricane Charley

Operationally, forecasters estimated that Charley struck southern Cuba with winds of 105 mph (170 km/h). In post-hurricane-season analysis, Charley was determined to have struck southern Cuba with winds of 120 mph (195 km/h) hurricane; the original estimate was revised based on a report of a sustained wind measurement of 118 mph (190 km/h) in Playa Baracoa, meaning Charley was a major hurricane at landfall. The hurricane produced a storm surge of up to 13.1 ft (4.0 m) in Playa Cajio; on the other hand, Charley's quick passage caused small amounts of precipitation, with the largest total being 5.87 inches (149 mm) in Mariel.

Strong wind gusts downed nearly 1,500 power lines and knocked over 28 large high tension wire towers at a power plant in Mariel. As a result, more than half of the electricity customers in Havana Province were left without power for 12 days after the storm, and all of Pinar del Río Province was without power for over 11 days. Blackouts continued in areas where power returned. The power outages resulted in lack of drinking water for numerous people, including no potable water in the city of Havana for four days. As a result, the Cuban government sent water tanks to satisfy the short term need. Similarly, there was a lack of gas for cooking for over a week. However, one Cuban government official stated that it could take up to two months for basic utilities to be returned to many isolated villages.

Near its landfall location, Charley destroyed 290 of the 300 houses in the village, while over 70,000 homes in Havana were either damaged or destroyed. Numerous hotels reported damage, potentially impacting the important tourism industry in the country. Agricultural damage was heavy, with the hurricane damaging more than 3,000 agricultural institutions. Citrus officials estimated a loss of 15,000 metric tons of grapefruit on the Isle of Youth, while strong winds ruined 66,000 metric tons of citrus trees in the Havana area. Charley also destroyed around 57,000 acres (230 km^{2}) of fruit trees in the Havana area. Approximately 95% of the sugar cane, bean, and banana crops were affected in Cuban territory. In all, Charley was directly responsible for four deaths in Cuba, and was responsible for $923 million in property damage, primarily from agricultural losses.

==== Cayman Islands ====
In spite of the close approach that Charley made on the Cayman Islands, the islands were mostly spared, and were subjected to little damage. Rainfall was light, peaking at 0.9 inches (23 mm) in Grand Cayman, while Cayman Brac reported tropical storm force winds.

=== United States ===
==== Florida ====
Strongest landfalling Atlantic U.S. hurricanes^{†}
Rank	Name^{‡}	Season	Wind speed	
Rank	Name^{‡}	Season	mph	km/h
1	"Labor Day"	1935	185	295
2	Camille	1969	175	280
3	Andrew	1992	165	270
4	"San Felipe II"*	1928	160	260
4	Michael	2018	160	260
6	Maria	2017	155	250
7	"Last Island"	1856	150	240
7	"Indianola"	1886	150	240
7	"Florida Keys"	1919	150	240
7	"Freeport"	1932	150	240
7	Charley	2004	150	240
7	Laura	2020	150	240
7	Ida	2021	150	240
7	Ian	2022	150	240
Source: NHC, AOML/HRD
^{†}Strength refers to maximum sustained wind speed upon striking land.
^{‡}Systems prior to 1950 were not officially named.
*Name given to the storm at its peak landfall.

Hurricane Charley severely affected the state of Florida. There were nine direct fatalities, 20 indirect fatalities, and numerous injuries attributed to the storm. Property damage was estimated at $5.4 billion, and approximately $285 million in agricultural damage. However, due to Charley's speed (it crossed the Florida peninsula in approximately seven hours) and small size, rainfall along the eyewall was mostly limited to 4–6 inches (10–15 centimetres).

While moving northward to the west of the Florida Keys, Charley produced moderate winds of 48 mph (77 km/h) with gusts to 60 mph (95 km/h) in Key West. The winds toppled a few trees, power lines, and unreinforced signs. A boat, knocked loose by strong waves, struck a power transmission line, causing widespread power outages from Marathon to Key West. On Fort Jefferson in the Dry Tortugas, the hurricane produced an estimated storm surge of up to 6 ft (1.8 m). The surge, combined with incoming waves, caused extensive flooding in the park and damaged numerous docks. In spite of this, property damage was minimal in the area, totaling $160,000.

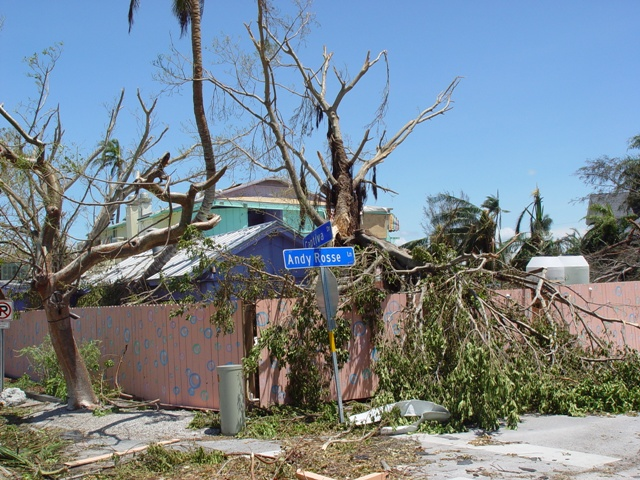
Damage in Captiva Island

Hurricane Charley passed directly over Captiva Island near Cayo Costa with peak winds of 150 mph (240 km/h). The Category 4 hurricane produced an estimated storm surge of up to 6.5 ft (2.0 m) on the island, which is lower than expected for a storm of its intensity. The decrease in the height of the surge was due to the hurricane's small size and its rapid intensification just prior to landfall. Furthermore, the storm surge, combined with the strong pressure gradient, produced a 450-metre-wide (0.28 mi) inlet on North Captiva Island, known as Charley's Cut. Strong waves and storm surge caused severe beach erosion and dune damage at various locations. The storm severely damaged five houses, lightly damaged many others, and downed many trees on Gasparilla Island. At least half of the 300 homes on North Captiva Island were substantially damaged, including ten that were destroyed. On Captiva Island, the strong winds severely damaged most houses, as well as several recreational buildings.

The city of Arcadia in DeSoto County saw extreme damage, despite being relatively further inland. About 95% of the buildings in the downtown area saw some sort of damage. The only shelter in the town had its roof torn open by the wind, leaving 3,500 evacuees inside unprotected from the onslaught of the storm.

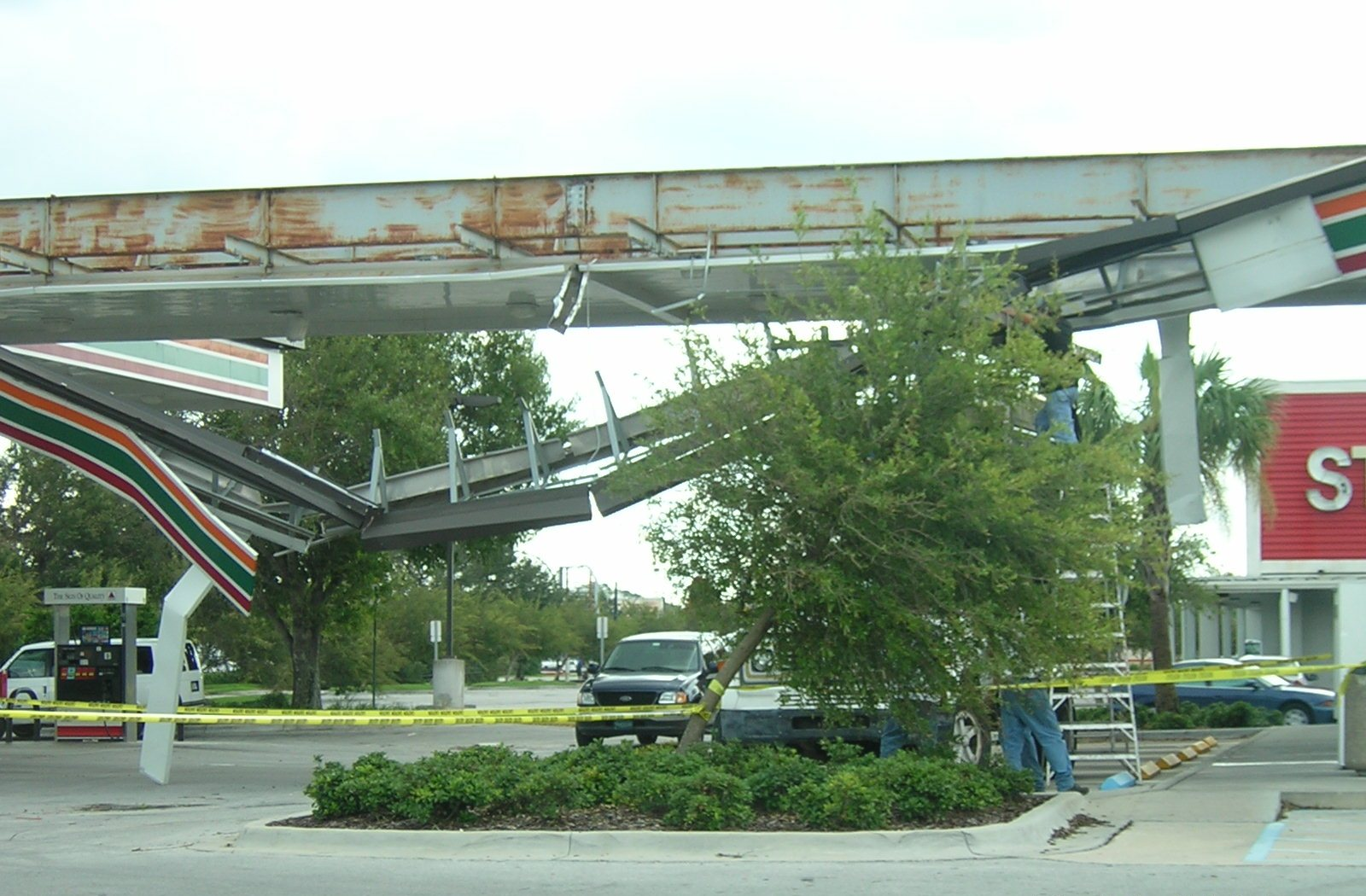
Damage caused to a gas station by Hurricane Charley in Kissimmee.

Hardee County saw property damage estimated at $750 million, along with six injuries, but no deaths were reported. Charley caused blackouts in the entire county, as well as damage to 3,600 homes and the destruction of 1,400. A radio tower near Sebring was toppled, along with numerous trees and power poles along the north and east side of Highlands County. Additionally, there were several reports of severely damaged homes in Polk County near Babson Park and Avon Park. In Lake Wales, Florida, a sand mine lake encroached into State Road 60 due to wave action and swallowed a car. Additionally, Lake Wales saw 23,000 buildings damaged, as well as the destruction of 739 structures. Seven deaths were reported in the county, one of them determined to be direct.

Throughout the rest of the islands in Sarasota, Charlotte, Lee, and Collier counties, strong winds from Hurricane Charley caused severe damage to hundreds of buildings and trees. Lee County also endured an 8-foot (2.4 m) storm surge. These counties were exposed to Charley's eyewall, so they saw the most damage. Due to its small size, the area of most intense damage was located within a 10-mile (16 km) band centered on Charley's track, with additional heavy damage forming an outer band extending 7.5 mi (12.1 km) to each side of the inner swath of damage. In Charlotte County, 80% of buildings were damaged.

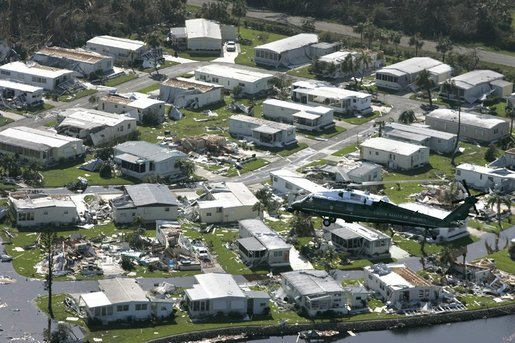
President George W. Bush, aboard Marine One, surveys hurricane damage at a mobile home park in Fort Myers.

On mainland Florida, Charley produced a peak storm surge of 10–13 feet (3.0–4.0 metres) at Vanderbilt Beach near Naples, along with a much lower surge at its Punta Gorda landfall. The hurricane dropped generally light rainfall across Florida, with the maximum amount of 9.88 inches (251 mm) occurring in Bud Slough in Manatee County, east of Myakka River State Park. In Punta Gorda's airport, where the hurricane made landfall, wind speeds of up to 90 mph (140 km/h) were measured, alongside gusts of up to 111 mph (179 km/h), before the instrument was blown apart, along with most of the planes and the airport itself. The Charlotte Regional Medical Center recorded an unofficial peak wind gust of 172 mph (277 km/h). In Port Charlotte, Charley's strong winds blew off the roof of Saint Joseph's Hospital and Fawcett Memorial Hospital. Due to the compact nature of the hurricane, the storm's radius of maximum sustained winds only extended a short distance from its center. In comparison, Fort Myers, which is only 25 mi (40 km) from where Charley made landfall, experienced sustained winds of only 61 mph (98 km/h) with gusts of 78 mph (126 km/h). In South Florida, Charley spawned several tornadoes, including a long-lived F2 that struck Clewiston, and five weak tornadoes near the point where the hurricane made landfall.

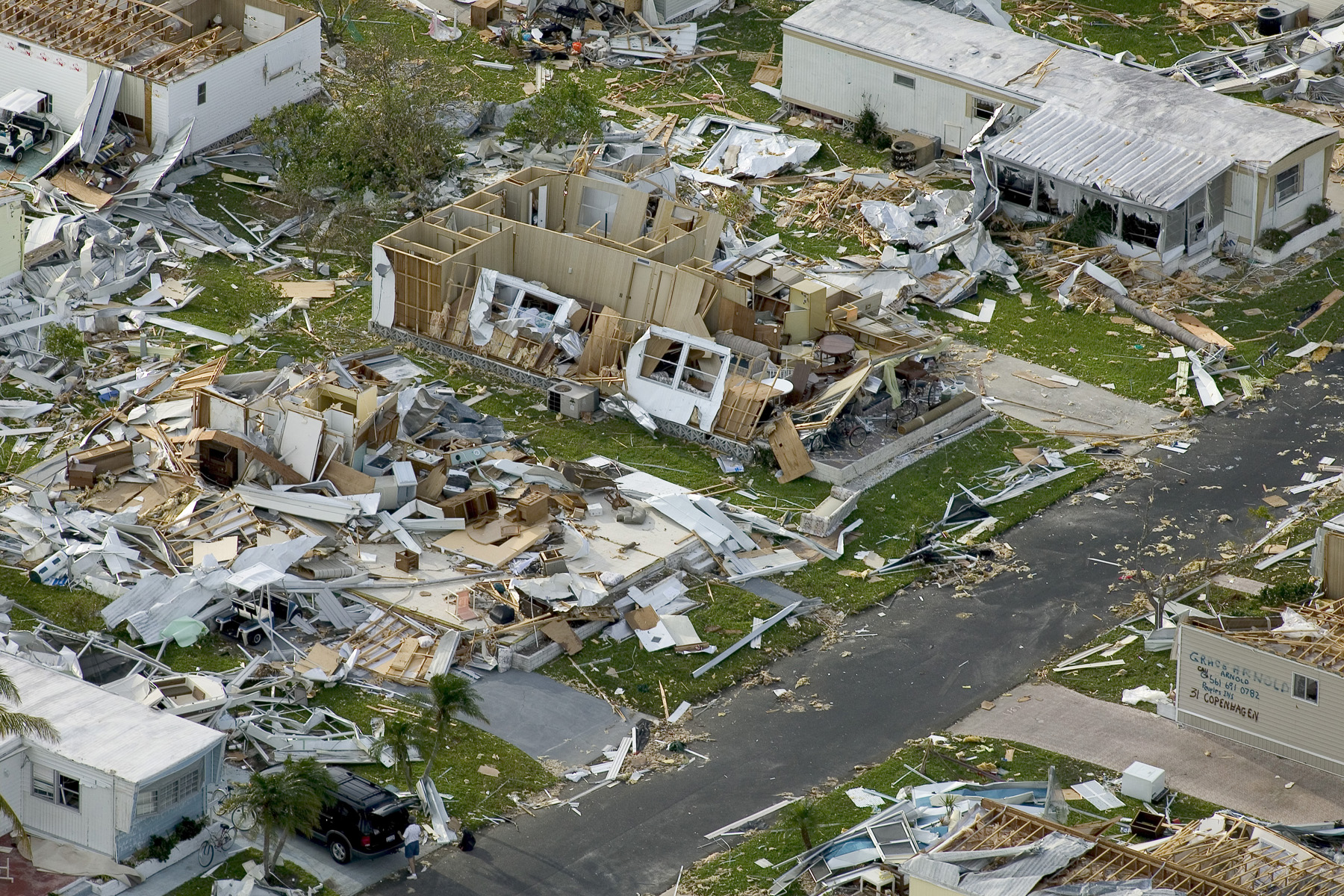
Aerial image of destroyed homes in Punta Gorda

The most severe damage from Hurricane Charley occurred in Charlotte County. In Boca Grande, numerous houses sustained extensive roof damage, while thousands of trees and power lines were uprooted or snapped. In Port Charlotte and Punta Gorda, many buildings, RVs, and mobile homes were completely destroyed, while other buildings suffered roofing damage due to the powerful winds.

Charley devastated Southwest Florida, causing $14.6 billion in property damage on the peninsula of Florida alone. Many towns such as Punta Gorda and Port Charlotte were leveled by the hurricane. Trees were downed and trailer parks were obliterated as far as Ormond Beach.

Charley also caused considerable damage in the central and eastern parts of the state. Several possible tornadoes occurred, with severe thunderstorms during the duration of the storm. Winds were estimated to be at 80 mph (130 km/h) sustained near, and to the north of Okeechobee, while winds at Orlando International Airport topped out around 110 mph (175 km/h) in a gust. At Orlando International Airport, debris littered two runways and lashing winds tore the roofs off three terminals and shattered two giant glass panels in the main terminal. The winds also ripped the roof right off of Brookside Elementary in Winter Park, leaving damage to the school, as well as the school's cafeteria. The storm caused 2 million customers to lose electricity in Florida. In some areas, power was not restored for weeks: 136,000 residents had no electricity a week after Charley's landfall, and 22,000 customers, primarily from cooperatives, were still waiting for their service to be restored on August 26. Citizens in Daytona Beach, New Smyrna Beach, and Port Orange in Southeastern Volusia County also dealt with storm surge from the St. Johns River and Halifax River, and Intracoastal Waterway as Charley passed over before re-emerging into the Atlantic Ocean. Further inland, Seminole County experienced some of the highest winds ever recorded from a hurricane in the area, with a gust of 97 mph (156 km/h) in Longwood at 04:07 UTC on August 14 and 101 mph (163 km/h) in Altamonte Springs.

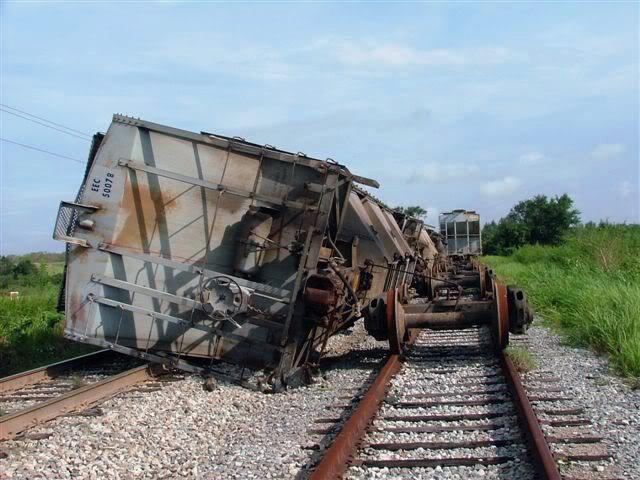
Empty railroad hopper cars toppled over as a result of high winds from Hurricane Charley in Fort Meade

Public schools in some counties in the path of the hurricane were scheduled to be closed for two weeks. In some areas this was necessary because the school buildings were damaged or destroyed: all 59 of Osceola County's schools were damaged, and one-third of Charlotte County's were destroyed by Charley's impact. DeSoto County schools saw $6 million in damage, while Orange County Public Schools saw $9 million in damage to their educational infrastructure.

Agricultural losses were heavy. In Florida, the second-largest producer of oranges in the world, damage to the citrus crop was estimated at $200 million, and caused a 50% increase in the price of grapefruit juice. Charley, along with the other storms that hit Florida during 2004, caused a total agricultural loss of $2.2 billion. Other crops, nurseries, buildings, and agricultural equipment also suffered.

==== North Carolina ====
Hurricane Charley produced moderate to heavy rainfall over the state, peaking at 5.05 inches (128 mm) near Greenville; other rainfall amounts ranged from less than 1 inch (25 mm)–more than 4 inches (100 mm). The outer rainbands began affecting the region in the early hours of August 14. Due to widespread debris, storm drains became clogged which left flooding in some areas. Freshwater flooding was reported in seven counties along the coastal plain. State highways 42 and 581, as well as numerous county and local roads, were covered with at least 1 foot (0.30 m) of water. Wilmington and surrounding towns were forced to close a total of 20 streets. The heavy precipitation also caused the Neuse River to swell to flood stage. A few businesses throughout the region were damaged; two in downtown Greenville and five others were flooded.

The storm produced estimated storm surge of 2 to 3 feet (0.61 to 0.91 m), along with waves of up to 8 feet (2.4 m) in height. However, there were isolated reports of 8 feet (2.4 m) surge, particularly along the beaches of Brunswick County. This produced minor beach erosion along the coastline. Winds gusted from 60–70 miles per hour (97–113 kilometres per hour), causing minor wind damage. The hurricane spawned five weak tornadoes across the state, including an F1 in Nags Head that damaged twenty structures. Charley destroyed 40 houses and damaged 2,231, 231 severely, including 221 damaged beach homes in Sunset Beach. Damage was the greatest in Brunswick County, where wind gusts peaked at 85 miles per hour (137 km/h). The winds blew down chimneys and damaged a roof on one building, and ripped the siding off another. Crop damage was also heavy in Brunswick County, with 50% of the tobacco crop lost and 30% of the corn and vegetable fields destroyed. Strong winds downed trees and power lines, leaving 65,000 homes without power. Damage in North Carolina totaled to $25 million (2004 USD).

==== South Carolina ====
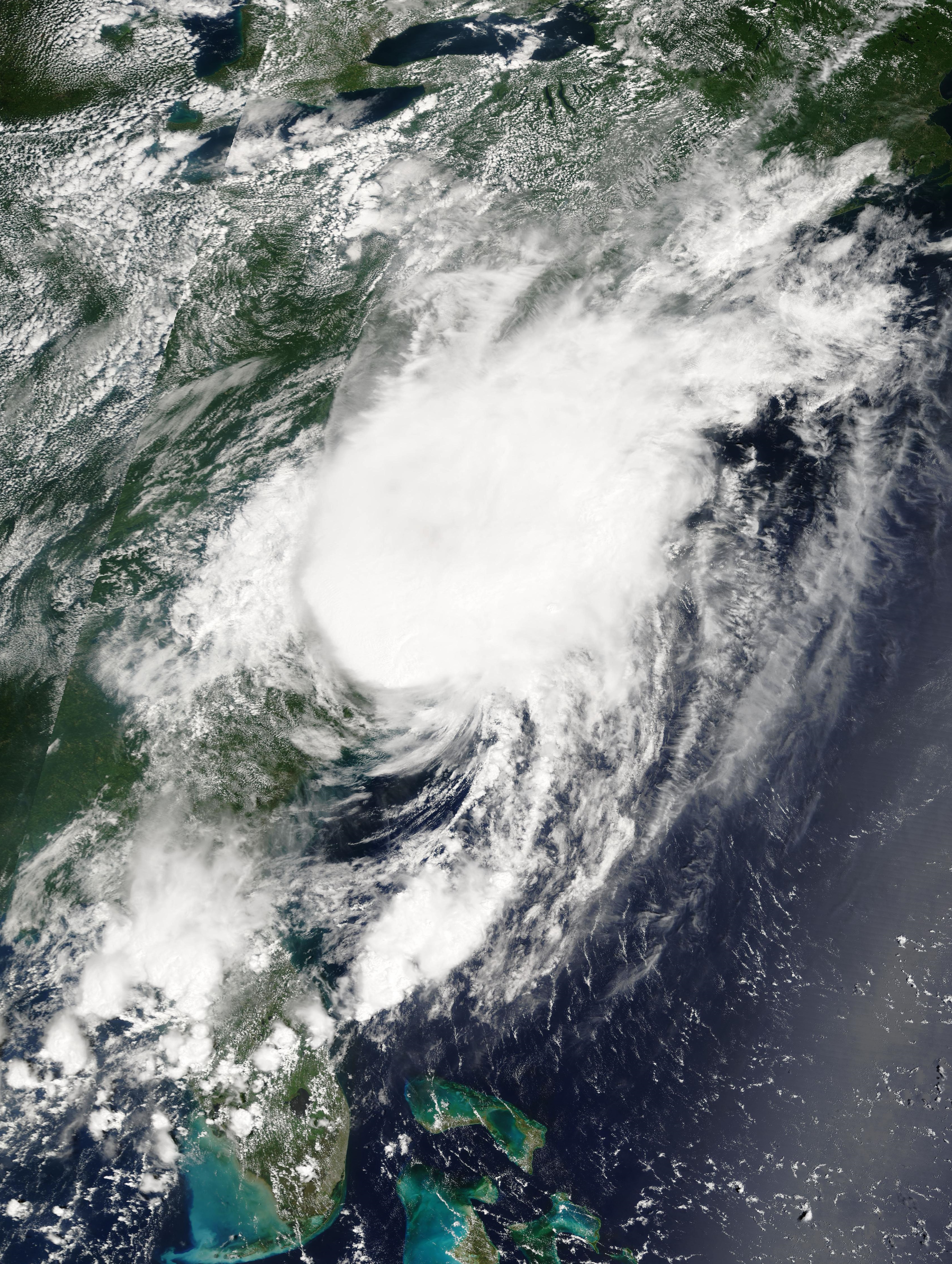
Charley making landfall near North Myrtle Beach, South Carolina

The strongest storm to make landfall in the state since Hurricane Hugo in 1989, Hurricane Charley struck near Cape Romain, South Carolina as an 80 mph (130 km/h) hurricane, moved offshore briefly, and made its final landfall near North Myrtle Beach as a minimal hurricane with winds of 75 mph (121 km/h) and gusts of 60 mph (97 km/h). In Myrtle Beach, Charley also produced a storm tide that was unofficially measured to up to 7.19 ft (2.19 m). With the landfalling system, five tornadoes were reported in the state. However, only two were confirmed; one moved through the Francis Marion National Forest, downing trees along its path. Storm surge ranged from 4–6 ft (1.2–1.8 m), although only minor beach erosion occurred. A buoy situated 41 nmi (47 mi) southeast of Charleston recorded 16 ft (4.9 m) seas and 74 miles per hour (119 km/h) winds.

Peak winds in the state were clocked at 63 mph (101 km/h) at the Isle of Palms. The storm spawned winds of 58 mph (93 km/h) at Folly Beach and 51 mph (82 km/h) in downtown Charleston. Trees, limbs and electrical poles were knocked down in those regions. Trees were blown onto U.S. Route 17 in Mount Pleasant, and awnings were torn off of a few structures. A total of 2,231 houses were damaged; 2317 of these were severely damaged and 40 were destroyed. Two-hundred and twenty-one of those damaged were beach front structures on Sunset Beach. Businesses had broken windows, six hotels had roof and outer wall damage. This led to $30 million (2004 USD) in hotel profit loss in Myrtle Beach, primarily along U.S. Route 17.

As dry air from northern sections of the state wrapped into the circulation of the storm, a band of convection developed along a frontal boundary stretching from Newberry northward. Widespread rainfall peaking at over 7 in (178 mm) fell to the west of the storm's track. In downtown Charleston, 2.09 in (53 mm) of rainfall was reported, while in Hampton 1.53 in (39 mm) of rain fell. However, the bulk of the rainfall remained offshore. With the soil still saturated from Tropical Storm Bonnie, some flooding in low-lying areas of Charleston County occurred. Up to 1 ft (0.30 m) of water accumulated on South Carolina Route 17 and on local streets. Flash floods were also observed in Mount Pleasant. High winds spread vegetative debris, clogging storm drains and caused further flooding. A bridge in Union County washed out following rainfall from Charley and Tropical Storm Bonnie. 135,000 customers were without power, and storm damage totaled $20 million (2004 USD).

Following the storm, Progress Energy Carolinas assembled 1,200 tree and power line personnel to assist in damage recovery. Federal disaster funds were approved for the counties of Georgetown and Horry. The declaration covered damage to public property on August 14–15. The funding covered state and local government costs for debris removal and emergency services related to the hurricane.

==== Other areas ====
Tropical Storm Charley produced wind gusts of up to 72 mph (116 km/h) at Chesapeake Light in Virginia, causing scattered power outages. Rainfall was light, ranging from 2 to 3.7 in (51 to 94 mm). Charley produced one tornado in Chesapeake and one in Virginia Beach. While impacts on Long Island were less then expected, the region still received 1–2 in (25–51 mm) of rain from Charley’s remnant moisture. In Rhode Island, one man drowned in a rip current.

== Aftermath ==
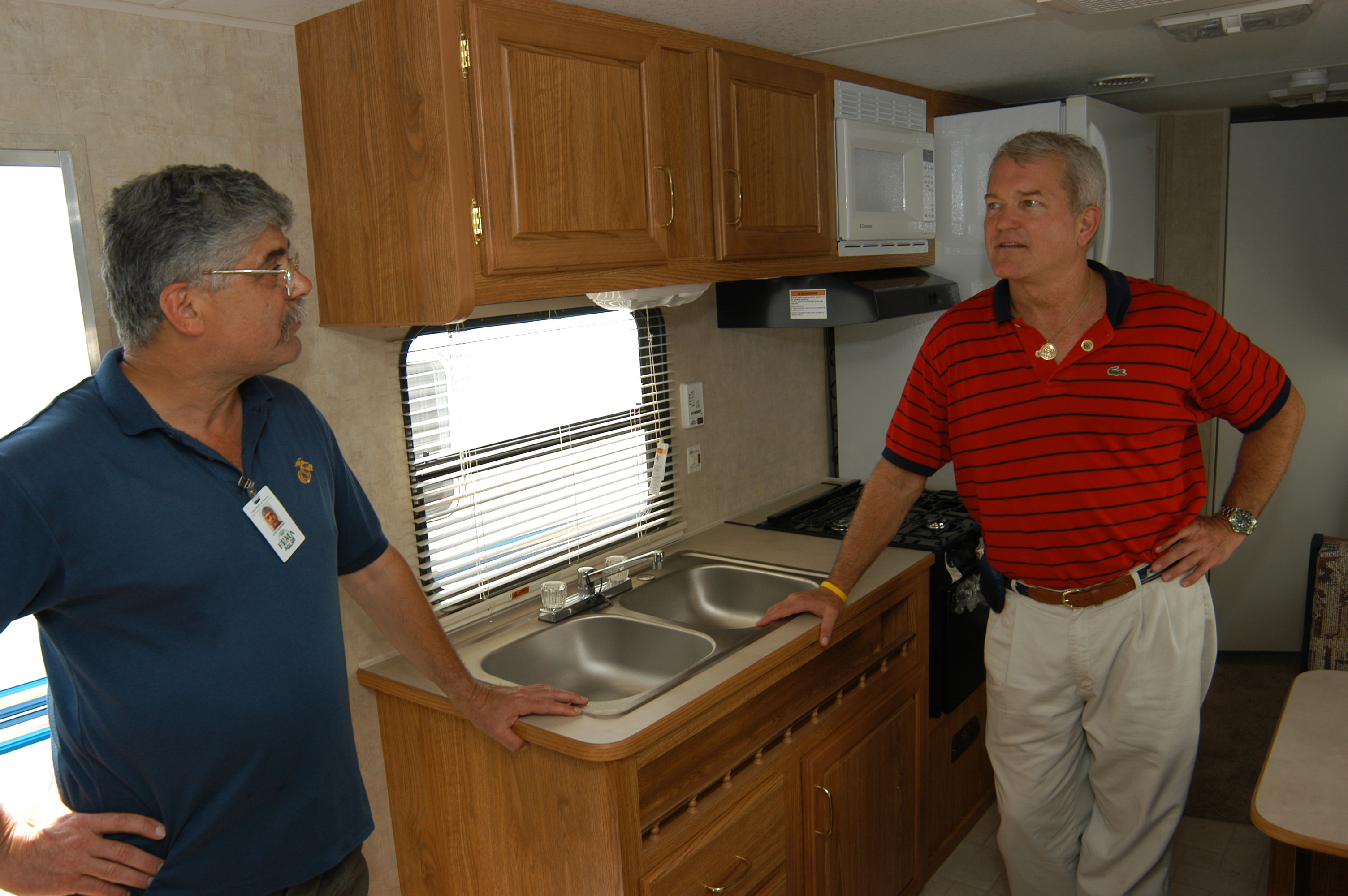
Congressman Mark Foley checks out the travel trailers that FEMA provided as temporary housing in Port Charlotte

=== Cuba ===
In Cuba, Hurricane Charley had disconnected the entirety Pinar del Río province from the Sistema Eléctrico Nacional (SEN). This damage to Cuba's electricity infrastructure became part of the impetus for Cuba's Energy Revolution campaign, which decentralized the country's electricity infrastructure, promoted renewable energy sources, and drastically decarbonized its economy.

=== United States ===
President George W. Bush declared Florida a federal disaster area. He later reflected on the government response to Charley:

...the job of the federal government and the state government is to surge resources as quickly as possible to disaster areas. And that's exactly what's happening now. We choppered over and saw the devastation of this area. A lot of people's lives are turned upside down. We've got ice and water moving in, trailers for people...are moving in. The state is providing security...There's a lot of compassion moving in the area, the Red Cross is here.

U.S. Health and Human Services Secretary Tommy Thompson released $11 million in additional aid and other assistance to Florida, with $10 million to be earmarked to Head Start facilities that need repair or new supplies, another $1 million was provided to the DeSoto Memorial Hospital in Arcadia and Osceola Regional Medical Center in Kissimmee, and $200,000 would be spent to provide services to senior citizens. Across Florida, 114 food service operations and eight comfort stations were set up. FEMA opened four disaster recovery centers.

FEMA's response to Charley won plaudits, and was crucial to Bush winning the state of Florida, and thus, re-election, in the 2004 United States presidential election.

=== Retirement ===
Because of the hurricane's effects in the United States, the name Charley was retired from the rotating lists of tropical cyclone names in the spring of 2005 by the World Meteorological Organization, and will never again be used for an Atlantic basin tropical cyclone. The name was replaced with Colin for the 2010 season.

== See also ==
- List of Florida hurricanes (2000–present)
- List of South Carolina hurricanes
- List of retired Atlantic hurricane names
- List of Category 4 Atlantic hurricanes
- Hurricane Donna (1960) – Another Category 4 hurricane that crossed Florida from southwest to northeast
- Hurricane Irma (2017) – A hurricane that made landfall as a Category 3 hurricane on the southwest side of Florida
- Hurricane Ian (2022) – A hurricane that also made landfall as a Category 4 hurricane at the same location
