= Charlotte Park, Florida =

- Census-designated place
- Location in Charlotte County and the state of Florida
- Coordinates: 26°54′11″N 82°02′55″W
- Country: United States
- State: Florida
- County: Charlotte

Area
  - Total: 1.26 sq mi (3.27 km^{2})
  - Land: 1.03 sq mi (2.66 km^{2})
  - Water: 0.24 sq mi (0.61 km^{2})
- Elevation: 3 ft (0.91 m)

Population (2020)
  - Total: 2,667
  - Density: 2,593/sq mi (1,001.2/km^{2})
- Time zone: UTC-5 (Eastern (EST))
  - Summer (DST): UTC-4 (EDT)
- ZIP code: 33950
- Area code: 941
- FIPS code: 12-11650
- GNIS feature ID: 2402765

Charlotte Park is a census-designated place (CDP) in Charlotte County, Florida, United States. The population was 2,667 at the 2020 census, up from 2,325 at the 2010 census. It is part of the Punta Gorda, Florida Metropolitan Statistical Area, included in the North Port-Bradenton, Florida Combined Statistical Area.

== Geography ==
Charlotte Park is located next to Punta Gorda, the Charlotte County seat. It is bordered by the larger city to the north, west, and south. The eastern edge of the CDP follows U.S. Route 41, the Tamiami Trail.

According to the United States Census Bureau, the CDP has a total area of 1.3 square miles (3.4 km^{2}), of which 1.0 square mile (2.7 km^{2}) is land and 0.27 square miles (0.7 km^{2}), or 20.58%, is water. The CDP is crossed by several canals which lead southwest to Charlotte Harbor, an inlet of the Gulf of Mexico.

== Demographics ==
Historical population
Census	Pop.	Note	%±
1990	2,225		—
2000	2,182		−1.9%
2010	2,325		6.6%
2020	2,667		14.7%
U.S. Decennial Census

=== 2020 census ===
As of the 2020 census, Charlotte Park had a population of 2,667. The median age was 69.1 years. 4.7% of residents were under the age of 18 and 60.0% of residents were 65 years of age or older. For every 100 females there were 94.0 males, and for every 100 females age 18 and over there were 95.2 males age 18 and over.

100.0% of residents lived in urban areas, while 0.0% lived in rural areas.

There were 1,436 households in Charlotte Park, of which 7.3% had children under the age of 18 living in them. Of all households, 55.1% were married-couple households, 16.7% were households with a male householder and no spouse or partner present, and 21.9% were households with a female householder and no spouse or partner present. About 32.2% of all households were made up of individuals and 23.8% had someone living alone who was 65 years of age or older.

There were 2,054 housing units, of which 30.1% were vacant. The homeowner vacancy rate was 4.6% and the rental vacancy rate was 19.6%.

Racial composition as of the 2020 census
Race	Number	Percent
White	2,463	92.4%
Black or African American	26	1.0%
American Indian and Alaska Native	5	0.2%
Asian	35	1.3%
Native Hawaiian and Other Pacific Islander	0	0.0%
Some other race	28	1.0%
Two or more races	110	4.1%
Hispanic or Latino (of any race)	94	3.5%

=== 2000 census ===
As of the census of 2000, there were 2,182 people, 1,152 households, and 744 families residing in the CDP. The population density was 1,801.5 inhabitants per square mile (695.6/km^{2}). There were 1,518 housing units at an average density of 1,253.3 per square mile (483.9/km^{2}). The racial makeup of the CDP was 98.08% White, 0.27% African American, 0.09% Native American, 0.18% Asian, 0.64% from other races, and 0.73% from two or more races. Hispanic or Latino of any race were 2.15% of the population.

There were 1,152 households, out of which 7.6% had children under the age of 18 living with them, 58.2% were married couples living together, 4.6% had a female householder with no husband present, and 35.4% were non-families. 30.9% of all households were made up of individuals, and 22.2% had someone living alone who was 65 years of age or older. The average household size was 1.89 and the average family size was 2.28.

In the CDP, the population was spread out, with 7.6% under the age of 18, 3.0% from 18 to 24, 11.6% from 25 to 44, 27.4% from 45 to 64, and 50.4% who were 65 years of age or older. The median age was 65 years. For every 100 females, there were 96.4 males. For every 100 females age 18 and over, there were 94.4 males.

The median income for a household in the CDP was $29,263, and the median income for a family was $35,462. Males had a median income of $26,397 versus $25,521 for females. The per capita income for the CDP was $22,434. About 4.2% of families and 6.8% of the population were below the poverty line, including 9.4% of those under age 18 and 1.4% of those age 65 or over.
