= Ted Wegert =

American football player (1932–1986)

Profile
- Position: Running back

Personal information
- Born: April 17, 1932; Riverhead, New York
- Died: February 18, 1986 (aged 53); Port Charlotte, Florida

Career information
- College: None

Career history
- Philadelphia Eagles (1955–1956); Pittsburgh Steelers (1957); Buffalo Bills (1960); Denver Broncos (1960); New York Titans (1960)
- Stats at Pro Football Reference

Theodore Addison Wegert (April 17, 1932 – February 18, 1986) was an American football running back in the National Football League for the Philadelphia Eagles and Pittsburgh Steelers. He also played in the American Football League for the Buffalo Bills, Denver Broncos, and the New York Titans. Wegert did not attend college.

== See also ==
- Other American Football League players
