= Southern Technical College =

Coordinates: 28.448515°N 81.399679°W

- Southern Technical College
- Former names: Southern Technical Institute (2001-2003); Southern Technical College (2003-present)
- Type: Private for-profit technical college
- Established: 2001
- Location: Orlando, Florida, United States of America
- Nickname: Southern Tech
- Website: SouthernTech.edu

Southern Technical College is a private for-profit technical college with multiple locations in Florida. It was founded in 2001 and provides diploma and associate degree programs. Southwest Florida College merged into Southern Technical College in 2014.

== Locations ==
Southern Technical College has campuses in the following cities:

- Auburndale
- Brandon
- Fort Myers
- Orlando
- Port Charlotte
- Sanford
- Tampa

== Accreditation and memberships ==
Southern Technical College is licensed by the Commission for Independent Education, Florida Department of Education. Southern Technical College is accredited by the Accrediting Commission of Career Schools and Colleges to award associate degrees and diplomas.
