= Port Charlotte, Florida =

- Census-designated place
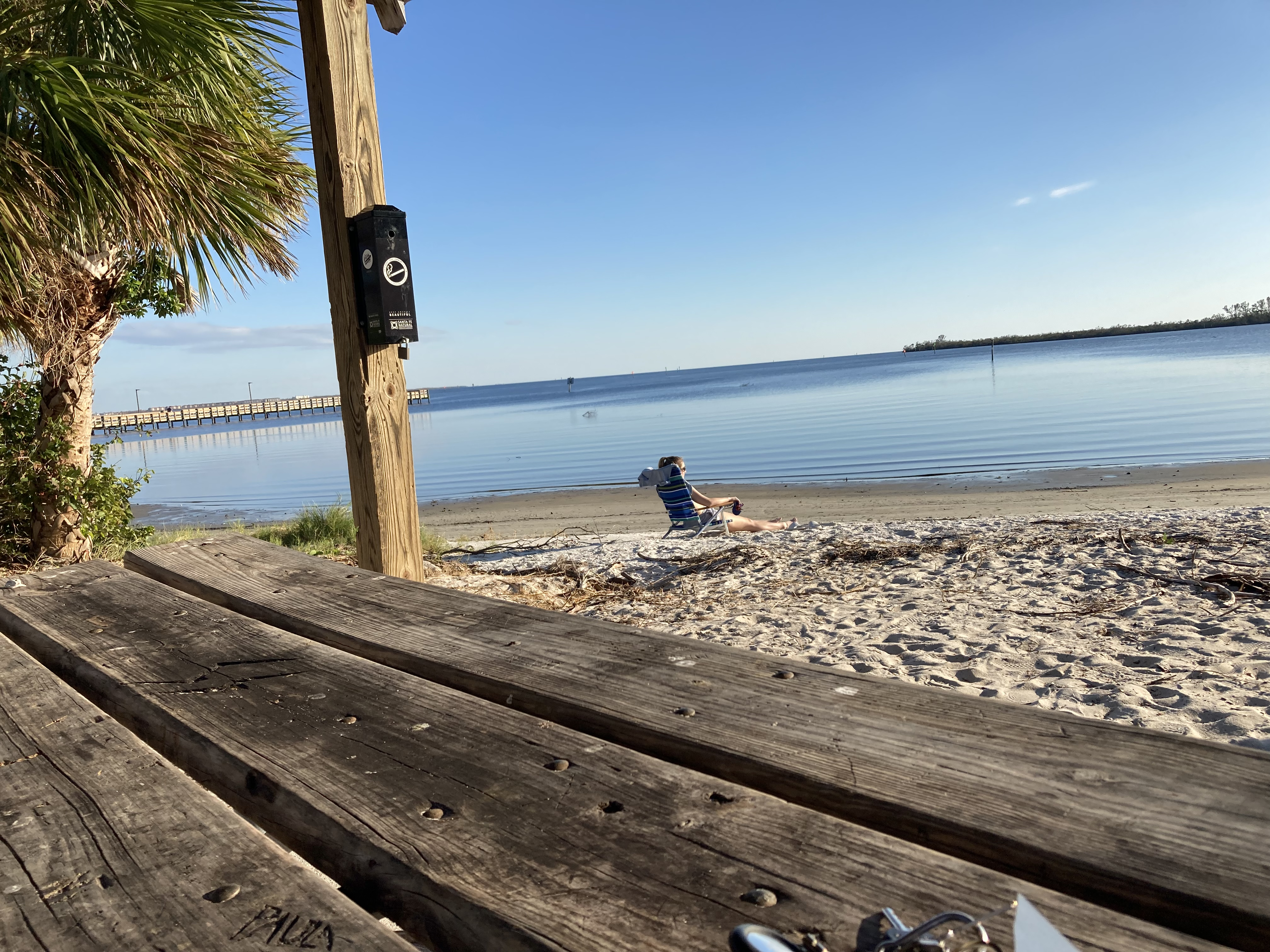
- Port Charlotte Beach

- Location in Charlotte County and the state of Florida
- Interactive map of Port Charlotte, Florida
- Coordinates: 26°59′25″N 82°06′48″W
- Country: United States
- State: Florida
- County: Charlotte

Area
  - Census-designated place: 32.34 sq mi (83.76 km^{2})
  - Land: 28.48 sq mi (73.76 km^{2})
  - Water: 3.86 sq mi (9.99 km^{2})
- Elevation: 10 ft (3.0 m)

Population (2020)
  - Census-designated place: 60,625
  - Density: 2,128.7/sq mi (821.88/km^{2})
  - Urban (Port Charlotte–North Port, FL): 199,998 (US: 194th)
  - Urban density: 1,484.8/sq mi (573.3/km^{2})
  - Metro (Punta Gorda, FL MSA): 194,843 (US: 229th)
- Time zone: UTC−5 (Eastern (EST))
  - Summer (DST): UTC−4 (EDT)
- ZIP codes: 33900-33999
- Area code: 941
- FIPS code: 12-58350
- GNIS feature ID: 2403437

Port Charlotte is a census-designated place and unincorporated community in Charlotte County, Florida, United States. The population was 60,625 at the 2020 census, up from 54,392 at the 2010 census. It is included in the Sarasota metropolitan area.

== History ==
The Calusa originally settled around the Port Charlotte area. In 1819, Florida was ceded by the Spanish and became a U.S. territory, and in 1845 Florida became the 27th state. For the first 100 years of statehood, the area around Port Charlotte was mostly undeveloped. Maps of the area at the turn of the 20th century show that most of the roads and railroads leading into southwest Florida had bypassed the Port Charlotte area. Aside from some cattle ranches and small farming, the area was mostly uninhabited. This would change when the post-World War II boom opened people's eyes to the possibility of developing land in Florida.

In the 1950s, the now defunct General Development Corporation led by the Mackle brothers decided to take advantage of the Florida land boom and developed land primarily on both of Florida's coastlines. Among the areas they planned and developed was the Port Charlotte area. Ultimately, Port Charlotte became the most populous community in Charlotte County, although like most GDC developments, Port Charlotte remained an unincorporated community.

Port Charlotte was severely impacted by Hurricane Charley on August 13, 2004. The hurricane, predicted to hit Tampa as a Category 2 hurricane, took a last-minute right hand turn and intensified into a Category 4 storm as it made landfall near Charlotte Harbor and caused severe damage in the city of Punta Gorda and in the Port Charlotte area. The storm's 145 miles per hour (233 km/h) maximum sustained winds destroyed almost half of the homes in the county and caused heavy ecological damage to sensitive wetlands in the area.

Just over 18 years later, Port Charlotte was once again severely impacted by a major hurricane, this time Hurricane Ian on September 28, 2022. Ian made landfall as a Category 4 storm in Cayo Costa State Park before moving north-east into Charlotte Harbor, with south-eastern Port Charlotte going through the eye of the storm. Ian caused severe damage to Port Charlotte, mostly wind-related, and to the rest of the surrounding area. Maximum sustained winds of 115 miles per hour (185 km/h) and a wind gust of 132 miles per hour (212 km/h) were reported by a private weather station in Port Charlotte.

== Geography ==
Port Charlotte is located at the north end of the Charlotte Harbor Estuary, northwest of the city of Punta Gorda. It is 100 miles (160 km) south of Tampa and 65 miles (105 km) north of Naples. According to the United States Census Bureau, the CDP has a total area of 32.3 square miles (83.7 km^{2}), of which 28.4 square miles (73.6 km^{2}) is land and 3.9 square miles (10.1 km^{2}) (12.01%), is water.

The area of northwestern Port Charlotte where State Road 776 intersects US 41 is also known as "Murdock".

=== Climate ===
Port Charlotte has a warm humid subtropical climate (Köppen climate classification: Cfa) bordering on a tropical wet and dry climate (Köppen climate classification: Aw). The summers are long, hot and humid with frequent afternoon thunderstorms. The winters are mild to warm with a pronounced drop in precipitation. Year round, the diurnal temperature change averages around 20 degrees Fahrenheit (11 degrees Celsius).

Climate data for Port Charlotte, Florida
Month	Jan	Feb	Mar	Apr	May	Jun	Jul	Aug	Sep	Oct	Nov	Dec	Year
Record high °F (°C)	89 (32)	92 (33)	93 (34)	94 (34)	98 (37)	102 (39)	99 (37)	99 (37)	95 (35)	94 (34)	93 (34)	89 (32)	102 (39)
Mean daily maximum °F (°C)	75 (24)	77 (25)	80 (27)	84 (29)	89 (32)	92 (33)	92 (33)	92 (33)	91 (33)	87 (31)	81 (27)	76 (24)	85 (29)
Mean daily minimum °F (°C)	52 (11)	54 (12)	57 (14)	61 (16)	66 (19)	72 (22)	74 (23)	74 (23)	73 (23)	67 (19)	60 (16)	54 (12)	64 (18)
Record low °F (°C)	23 (−5)	27 (−3)	29 (−2)	38 (3)	49 (9)	57 (14)	63 (17)	65 (18)	61 (16)	45 (7)	28 (−2)	25 (−4)	23 (−5)
Average precipitation inches (mm)	2.21 (56)	2.31 (59)	2.71 (69)	1.70 (43)	3.15 (80)	8.45 (215)	7.78 (198)	7.82 (199)	6.75 (171)	3.12 (79)	1.87 (47)	1.77 (45)	49.64 (1,261)
Source: The Weather Channel

Climate data for Port Charlotte
Month	Jan	Feb	Mar	Apr	May	Jun	Jul	Aug	Sep	Oct	Nov	Dec	Year
Mean daily daylight hours	10.5	11.0	12.0	13.0	13.5	14.0	13.5	13.0	12.5	11.5	11.0	10.5	12.2
Source: Weather Atlas

== Demographics ==
Historical population
Census	Pop.	Note	%±
1960	3,197		—
1970	10,789		237.5%
1980	25,770		138.9%
1990	41,535		61.2%
2000	46,451		11.8%
2010	54,392		17.1%
2020	60,625		11.5%

=== Racial and ethnic composition ===
Port Charlotte CDP, Florida – Racial and ethnic composition Note: the US Census treats Hispanic/Latino as an ethnic category. This table excludes Latinos from the racial categories and assigns them to a separate category. Hispanics/Latinos may be of any race.
Race / Ethnicity (NH = Non-Hispanic)	Pop 2000	Pop 2010	Pop 2020	% 2000	% 2010	% 2020
White alone (NH)	39,890	42,903	44,474	85.88%	78.88%	73.36%
Black or African American alone (NH)	2,895	4,753	4,847	6.23%	8.74%	8.00%
Native American or Alaska Native alone (NH)	122	130	129	0.26%	0.24%	0.21%
Asian alone (NH)	521	838	1,140	1.12%	1.54%	1.88%
Native Hawaiian or Pacific Islander alone (NH)	15	26	33	0.03%	0.05%	0.05%
Other race alone (NH)	57	86	333	0.12%	0.16%	0.55%
Mixed race or Multiracial (NH)	556	943	2,660	1.20%	1.73%	4.39%
Hispanic or Latino (any race)	2,395	4,713	7,009	5.16%	8.66%	11.56%
Total	46,451	54,392	60,625	100.00%	100.00%	100.00%

=== 2020 census ===
As of the 2020 census, Port Charlotte had a population of 60,625. The median age was 53.8 years. 15.4% of residents were under the age of 18 and 31.0% of residents were 65 years of age or older. For every 100 females there were 94.4 males, and for every 100 females age 18 and over there were 92.3 males age 18 and over.

99.8% of residents lived in urban areas, while 0.2% lived in rural areas.

There were 25,999 households in Port Charlotte, of which 19.9% had children under the age of 18 living in them. Of all households, 46.3% were married-couple households, 17.8% were households with a male householder and no spouse or partner present, and 27.7% were households with a female householder and no spouse or partner present. About 28.7% of all households were made up of individuals and 17.3% had someone living alone who was 65 years of age or older. There were 16,077 families residing in the CDP.

There were 29,998 housing units, of which 13.3% were vacant. The homeowner vacancy rate was 2.1% and the rental vacancy rate was 10.4%.

Racial composition as of the 2020 census
Race	Number	Percent
White	46,264	76.3%
Black or African American	5,061	8.3%
American Indian and Alaska Native	196	0.3%
Asian	1,183	2.0%
Native Hawaiian and Other Pacific Islander	36	0.1%
Some other race	2,046	3.4%
Two or more races	5,839	9.6%
Hispanic or Latino (of any race)	7,009	11.6%

=== 2010 census ===
As of the 2010 United States census, there were 54,392 people, 24,501 households, and 15,658 families residing in the CDP.

=== 2000 census ===
As of the census of 2000, there were 46,451 people, 20,453 households, and 13,601 families residing in the CDP. The population density was 2,085.9/sq mi (805.3/km^{2}). There were 23,315 housing units at an average density of 1,047.0 per square mile (404.2/km^{2}). The racial makeup of the CDP was 89.23% White, 6.53% African American, 0.28% Native American, 1.14% Asian, 0.05% Pacific Islander, 1.18% from other races, and 1.59% from two or more races. Hispanic or Latino of any race were 5.16% of the population.

In 2000, there were 20,453 households, out of which 20.8% had children under the age of 18 living with them, 53.2% were married couples living together, 10.1% had a female householder with no husband present, and 33.5% were non-families. 28.2% of all households were made up of individuals, and 18.6% had someone living alone who was 65 years of age or older. The average household size was 2.25 and the average family size was 2.71.

In 2000, in the CDP, the age distribution of the population shows 18.7% under the age of 18, 5.4% from 18 to 24, 21.0% from 25 to 44, 24.2% from 45 to 64, and 30.7% who were 65 years of age or older. The median age was 49 years. For every 100 females, there were 87.7 males. For every 100 females age 18 and over, there were 84.2 males.

== Arts and culture ==
Port Charlotte Library (established in 1961) and Mid-County Regional Library are located here. They are part of the Charlotte County Library System.

== Sports ==
Port Charlotte was home to the Charlotte Stone Crabs, which is a member of the Florida State League and Class High-A affiliate of the Tampa Bay Rays, which also hold its spring training at Charlotte Sports Park until 2020. The Rays also hold extended spring training in Port Charlotte, and have a Florida Complex League team which began to play in June 2009.

The Port Charlotte Invitational was a golf tournament held in 1969 at the Port Charlotte Golf & Country Club on the LPGA Tour. Kathy Whitworth won the event.

== Government ==
Since Port Charlotte is unincorporated, it is governed by the Charlotte County Board of County Commissioners. The county is governed by a 5-person county commission. They take turns rotating into the commission chair position every year. County commissioners frequently sit on other regional boards involving other municipalities and counties.

== Education ==
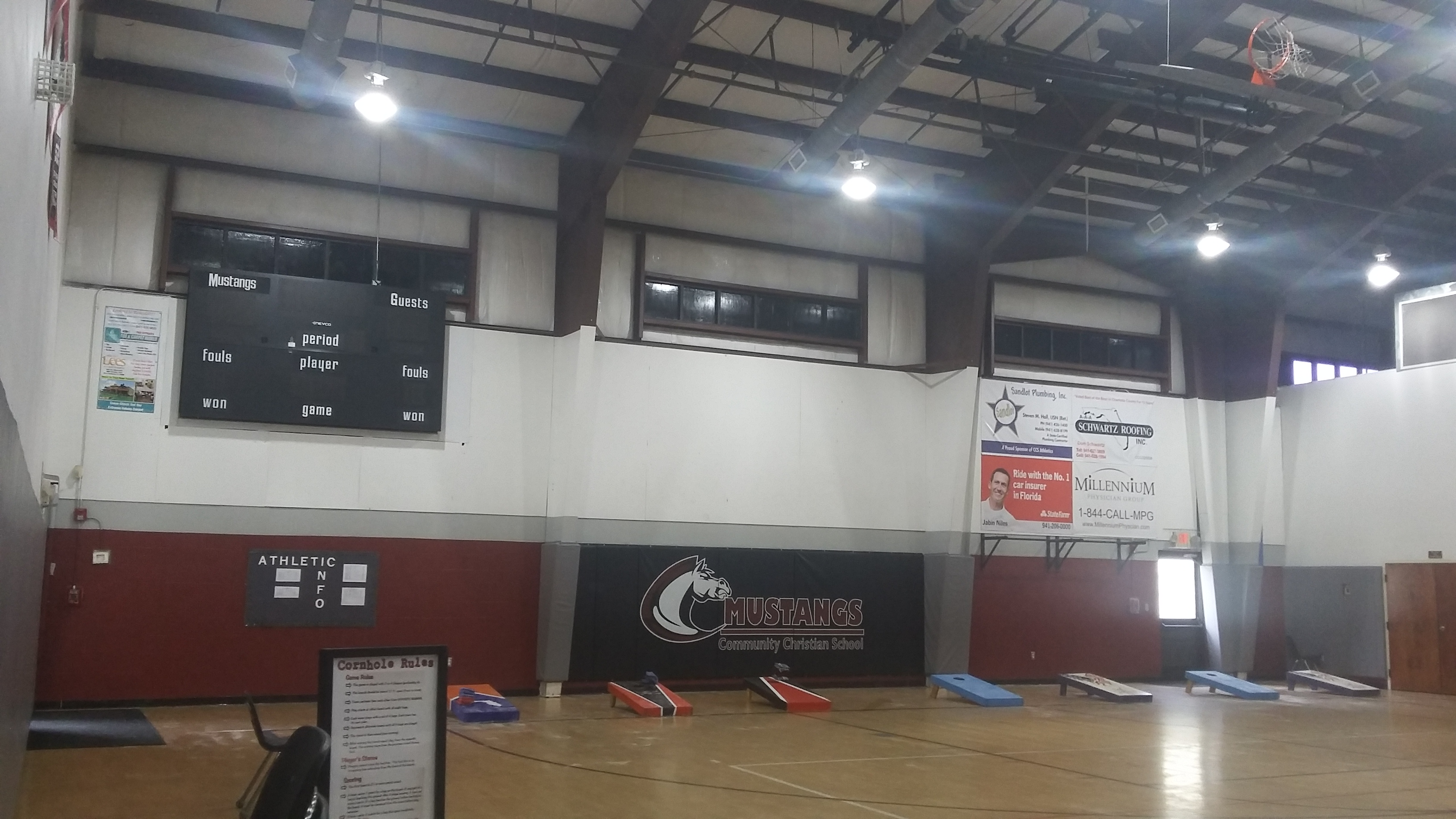
The gymnasium at Family Christian Academy, formerly known as Community Christian School

Public schools education is administered by Charlotte County Public Schools. Public schools in Port Charlette include Port Charlotte High School.

Private schools in Port Charlotte include:

- Family Christian Academy
- Charlotte Preparatory School
- Genesis Christian School
- Joyful Noise Learning Center
- Port Charlotte Adventist School
- Port Charlotte Christian School
- St. Charles Borromeo Catholic School

Technical schools include:

- Charlotte Technical College
- Southern Technical College's Port Charlotte campus
- Southwest Florida Bible Institute

== Infrastructure ==
=== Health care ===
AdventHealth Port Charlotte and HCA Florida Fawcett Hospital are the only two hospitals.

== Notable people ==
- Charlie Bachman (1892–1985) – college football player and coach
- Patricia Barringer (1924–2007) – All-American Girls Professional Baseball League (AAGPBL) player
- Kim Pawelek Brantly (born 1974) – middle and long-distance runner
- Al Bruno (1927–2014) – gridiron football player, coach, and sports administrator
- Jeff Corsaletti (born 1983) – Minor League Baseball player
- Marty DeMerritt (1953–2025) – Minor League Baseball player and Major League Baseball (MLB) coach
- Doug Dunakey (born 1963) – professional golfer
- Vinnie Fiorello (born 1974) – co-founder and drummer–lyricist for the band Less Than Jake
- Jim Fridley (1924–2003) – MLB player
- Billy Goelz (1918–2002) – professional wrestler
- Bob Grumman (1941–2015) – poet
- John Hall (born 1974) – National Football League (NFL) player
- Vincent Hancock (born 1989) – skeet shooter and Olympian
- Nathan Handwerker (1892–1974) – founder of Nathan's Famous
- Anthony Hargrove (born 1983) – NFL player
- David Holmberg (born 1991) – MLB player
- Raymond W. Hood (1936–2002) – Michigan House of Representatives member
- Douglas T. Jacobson (1925–2000) – United States Marine Corps major and Medal of Honor recipient
- Matt LaPorta (born 1985) – MLB player and 2008 Olympian
- Asher Levine (born 1988) – fashion designer
- Barbara Liebrich (1922–2006) – AAGPBL baseball player
- T. J. Luther (born 2000) – NFL player
- Walter Minx (1917–2009) – bomb-maker who threatened to blow up a Sears store to extort money
- Thomas C. Peebles (1921–2010) – physician who discovered the measles virus
- René Robert (1948–2021) – National Hockey League (NHL) player
- Eileen Southern (1920–2002) – musicologist and educator
- Roy Spencer (1900–1973) – MLB player
- Chuck Taylor (1901–1969) – inventor of the Chuck Taylor All-Stars sneakers
- Ted Wegert (1932–1986) – NFL player
- Pete Whisenant (1929–1996) – MLB player
- Josephine Wilkins (1893–1977) – feminist and president of the Georgia branch of the League of Women Voters
- Josh Williams (born 1993) – NASCAR and ARCA driver
