= HCA Florida Fawcett Hospital =

- Hospital Corporation of America
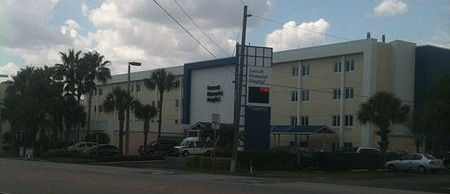

Geography
- Location: 21298 Olean Boulevard, Port Charlotte, Florida, United States
- Coordinates: 26°59′19.7″N 82°05′52.86″W

Organization
- Care system: Private
- Type: Acute care, Academic
- Affiliated university: Florida SouthWestern State College

Services
- Standards: JCAHO accreditation
- Beds: 238

History
- Founded: 1975

Links
- Website: www.fawcetthospital.com
- Lists: Hospitals in Florida

HCA Florida Fawcett Hospital, formerly Fawcett Memorial Hospital, is a 238 bed for profit acute-care hospital at 21298 Olean Boulevard in Port Charlotte, Florida. It is owned by Hospital Corporation of America (commonly known as HCA). The hospital's slogan is "Our family caring for yours." It is certified in many fields, including stroke, cardiology/chest pain, and cancer.
