= Old Charlotte County Courthouse =

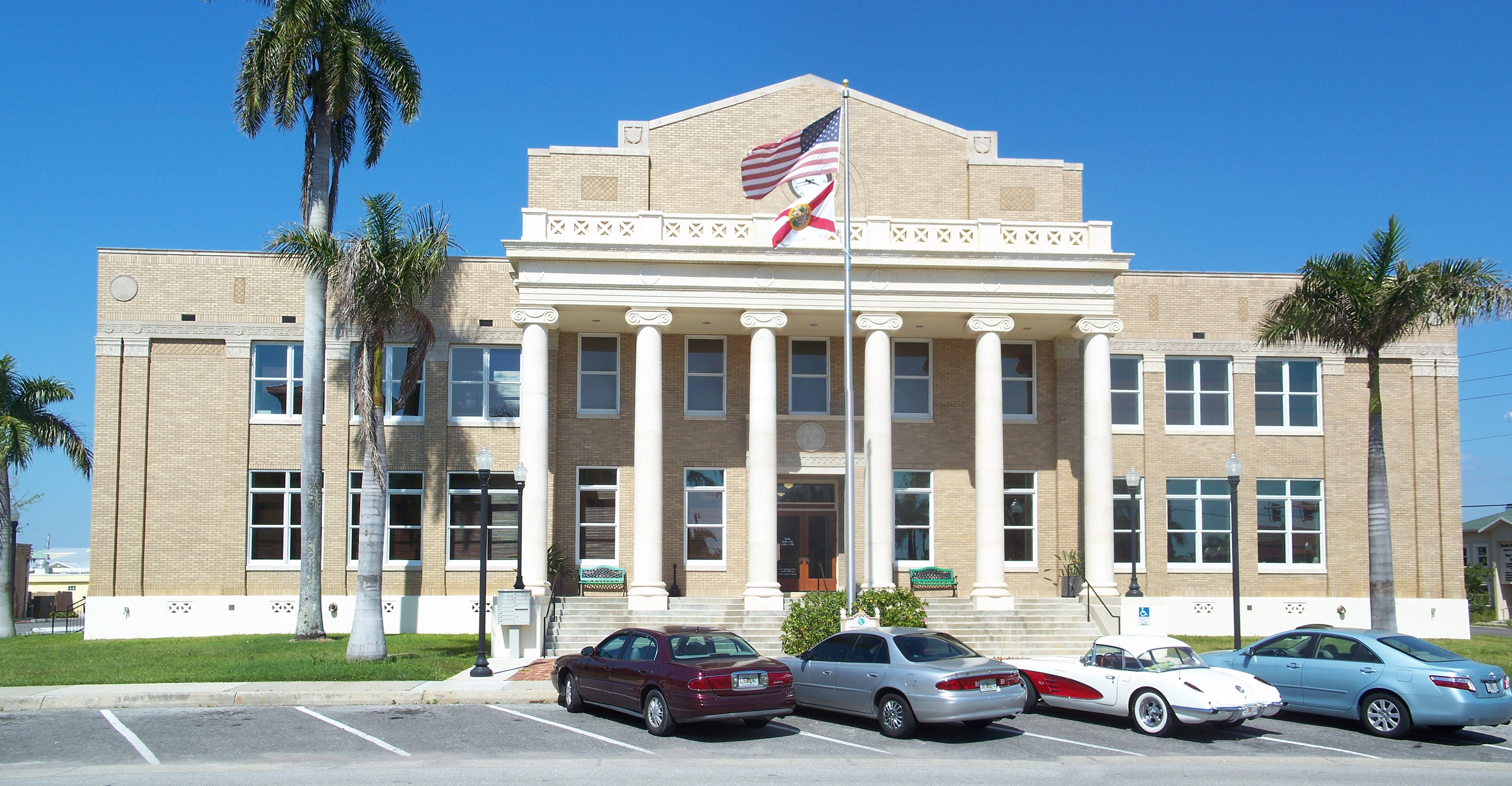
- Old Charlotte County Courthouse in 2010
- Interactive map of the Old Charlotte County Courthouse area

General information
- Architectural style: Classical Revival
- Location: 226 Taylor Street, Punta Gorda, Florida, United States
- Coordinates: 26°56′4″N 82°3′1″W
- Construction started: 1927
- Completed: 1928
- Cost: $106,900 bid price, with final cost with changes $200,000 including $25,000 land cost
- Client: Charlotte County

Technical details
- Structural system: brick

Design and construction
- Architects: Leitner and Henson of St. Petersburg
- Engineer: Builder: Paul H. Smith of Haines City

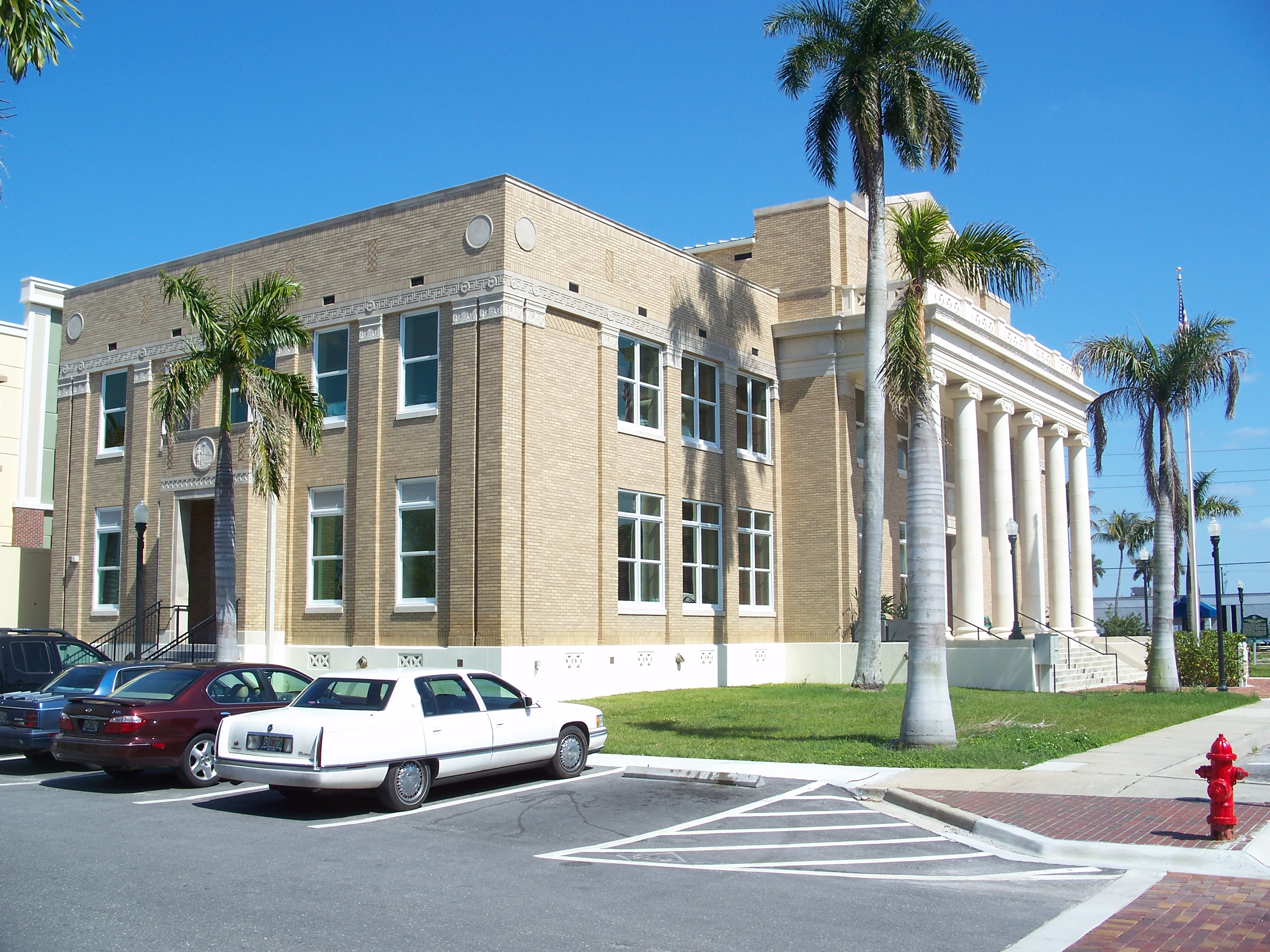
A side view

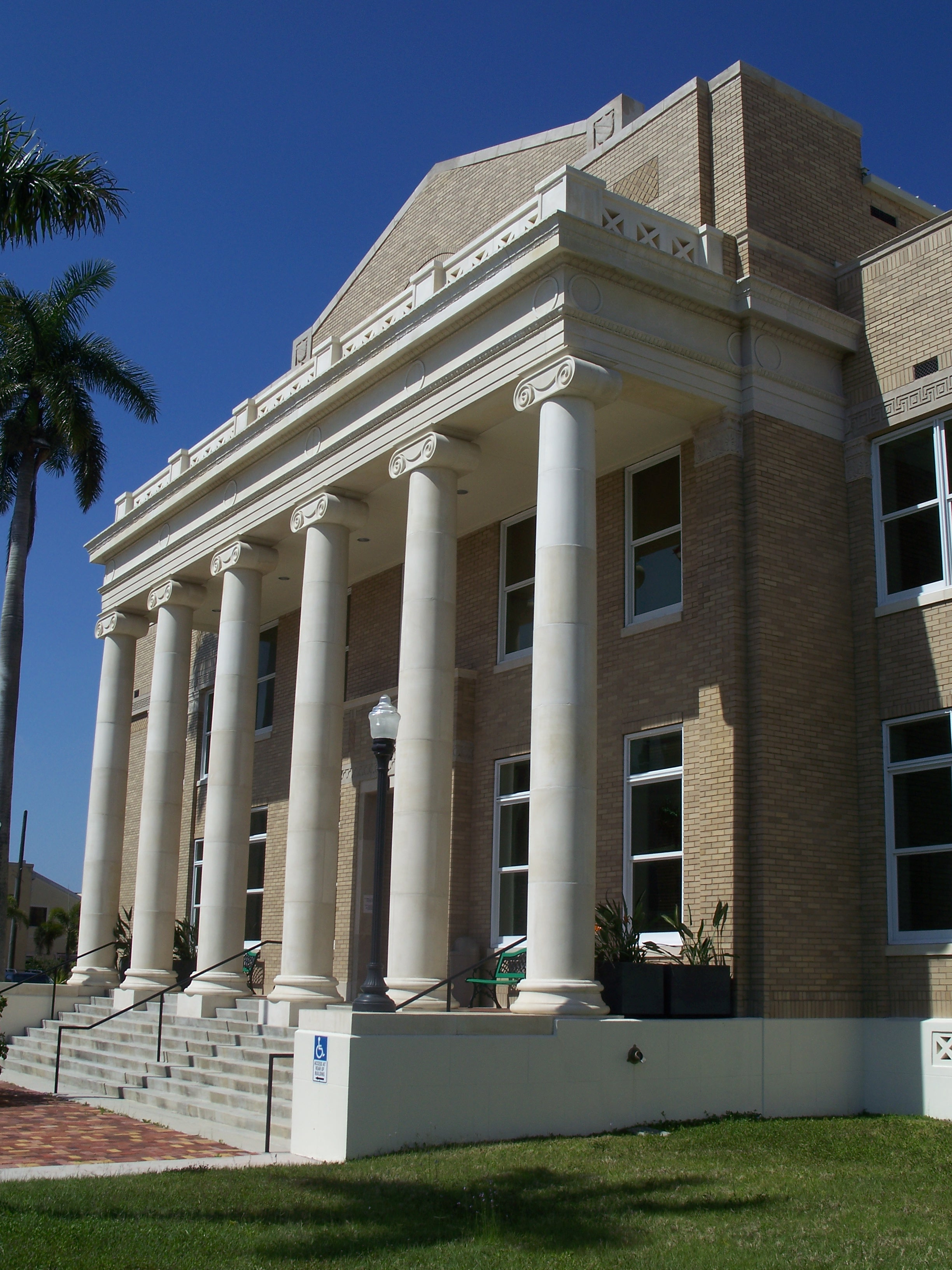
Front detail

The Old Charlotte County Courthouse is an historic two-story yellow brick courthouse building located at 226 Taylor Street in Punta Gorda, Florida. Designed in the Classical Revival style by architects Leitner and Henson of St. Petersburg, it was built between 1927 and 1928 by Paul H. Smith of Haines City. Additions were made to the building the 1960s and 1980s but in 1999 it was replaced by a new Justice Center and then fell into disuse. In 2005, the additions having been demolished, the Board of County Commissioners undertook the restoration and renovation of the original 1928 structure that remained. It was reopened to the public in a ceremony on February 29, 2008.

In 1989, the Old Charlotte County Courthouse was listed in A Guide to Florida's Historic Architecture, published by the University of Florida Press.
