= List of county roads in Charlotte County, Florida =

- County road shields used in Florida

Highway names
- Interstates: Interstate X (I-X)
- US Highways: U.S. Highway X (US X)
- State: State Road X (SR X)
- County: County Road X (CR X)

System links
- County roads in Florida; County roads in Charlotte County

The following numbered county roads exist in Charlotte County, Florida. As with most Florida counties, numbers are assigned in a statewide grid. County roads in Charlotte County are maintained by Charlotte County Public Works.

== County Road 74 ==
County Road 74
- Location: Cleveland–Bermont
- Length: 26.9 mi (43.3 km)

County Road 74 is Bermont Road in eastern Charlotte County.

=== Route description ===
Bermont Road begins at US 17 in Cleveland. From here, it heads due east into rural Charlotte County. 15 miles later, it intersects with SR 31, a rural road that runs from Fort Myers to Arcadia. Bermont Road continues east from SR 31 and after another 12 miles, CR 74 enters Glades County and continues toward Palmdale.

=== History ===
Bermont Road was originally designated as SR 262 when it was added to the state highway system. During the 1945 Florida state road renumbering, it was redesignated SR 74. It would remain SR 74 until the 1980s, when it was relinquished to county control. Bermont Road is named for the ghost town of Bermont, which was located near the intersection of SR 31.

=== Major intersections ===
Location	mi	km	Destinations	Notes
Cleveland	0.0	0.0	US 17 (SR 35 / Duncan Road) – Punta Gorda, Arcadia	
	14.8	23.8	SR 31 (Babcock Ranch Road) – Arcadia, Fort Myers	
	26.9	43.3	CR 74 east	Continuation into Glades County
1.000 mi = 1.609 km; 1.000 km = 0.621 mi

== County Road 764 ==
County Road 764
- Location: Cleveland
- Length: 10.2 mi (16.4 km)

County Road 764 is Washington Loop Road just northeast of Cleveland. It begins at US 17 and runs east for 4.5 miles. It then turns north and crosses Shell Creek, a tributary of the Peace River. In less than a mile, it turns back west and terminates back at US 17.

== County Road 765 ==
County Road 765
- Location: South Punta Gorda Heights
- Length: 9.9 mi (15.9 km)

County Road 765 is Burnt Store Road in southern Charlotte County.

=== Route description ===
CR 765 enters Charlotte County just northeast of Burnt Store Marina (located in Lee County). From the county line, it expands to four lanes and heads north. It runs along the eastern border of the Charlotte Harbor Preserve State Park before coming to an intersection with US 41 (Tamiami Trail) in South Punta Gorda Heights.

At US 41, CR 765 briefly becomes Jones Loop Road as it crosses the Seminole Gulf Railway. 500 feet north of US 41, CR 765 turns left on to another segment of Burnt Store Road, while Jones Loop Road continues east as CR 768. CR 765 continues north along Burnt Store Road, which is two lanes, to its northern terminus at Taylor Road (CR 765A).

=== History ===
The road is named after the community of Burnt Store Marina, which is located in Lee County just south of the Charlotte County line. Burnt Store Marina is the historic locations of a general store and trading post that was burned down by a small group of Seminole Indians led by Chief Billy Bowlegs in protest of settlers taking their land.

Burnt Store Road was designated as part of SR 183 when it was added to the state highway system. After the 1945 Florida state road renumbering, the road became SR 765. It later became CR 765 when it was relinquished to county control in the 1980s.

CR 765 was widened to a four-lane divided road from the county line to just east of the Seminole Gulf Railway crossing in phases from 2012 to 2022.

=== Major intersections ===
Location	mi	km	Destinations	Notes
	0.0	0.0	CR 765 south (Burnt Store Road)	Continuation into Lee County
	8.3	13.4	CR 768 east (Acline Road)	
	8.8	14.2	US 41 (SR 45) – Fort Myers, Punta Gorda	
	8.9	14.3	CR 768 east (North Jones Loop Road) to I-75	
	9.9	15.9	CR 765A (Taylor Road)	
1.000 mi = 1.609 km; 1.000 km = 0.621 mi

== County Road 765A ==
County Road 765A
- Location: Punta Gorda
- Length: 4.9 mi (7.9 km)

County Road 765A is Taylor Road in Punta Gorda and southern Charlotte County.

=== Route description ===
Taylor Road begins at US 41 (Tamiami Trail) just north of Tropical Gulf Acres. It crosses the Seminole Gulf Railway and heads north. After an intersection with Acline Road (CR 768), Taylor Road turns northwest, and parallels US 41. Just north of Airport Road, Taylor Road enters Punta Gorda city limits. It passes the historic Punta Gorda Atlantic Coast Line Depot at Carmalita Street, where the railroad tracks cross through the intersection. CR 765A terminates at the northbound lanes of US 41 just outside of Downtown Punta Gorda. The road continues north as a city street named Taylor Street to Harborside Avenue in Downtown Punta Gorda, running between the one-way northbound and southbound US 41.

=== History ===
Taylor Road was previously SR 765A before being relinquished to county control in the 1980s.

=== Major intersections ===
Location	mi	km	Destinations	Notes
	0.0	0.0	US 41 (SR 45) – Fort Myers, Punta Gorda	
	0.7	1.1	CR 768 (Acline Road / South Jones Loop Road)	
	1.5	2.4	CR 768 (North Jones Loop Road)	
	2.6	4.2	CR 765 south (Burnt Store Road)	
	3.6	5.8	Airport Road	to Punta Gorda Airport
	4.9	7.9	US 41 north (SR 45)	continues north as Taylor Street
1.000 mi = 1.609 km; 1.000 km = 0.621 mi

== County Road 769 ==
County Road 769
- Location: Charlotte Harbor
- Length: 5.3 mi (8.5 km)

County Road 769 is Kings Highway running from Charlotte Harbor northeast to Desoto County.

=== Route description ===
Kings Highway begins at US 41 (Tamiami Trail) just north of the Peace River. From here, it heads north and quickly intersects Harborview Road (CR 776). It then turns northeast and passes near residential communities, the Maple Leaf Golf and Country Club, and Kings Gate Golf Club. Kings Highway then intersects Veterans Boulevard, which runs west to US 41 and SR 776 in Port Charlotte. Less than half a mile after Veterans Boulevard, Kings Highway comes to an interchange with Interstate 75. CR 769 then crosses into Desoto County near Lake Suzy.

=== Major intersections ===
Location	mi	km	Destinations	Notes
Charlotte Harbor	0.0	0.0	US 41 (SR 45) – Punta Gorda, Port Charlotte	
Charlotte Harbor	0.1	0.16	CR 776 (Harborview Road)	
	2.8	4.5	Midway Boulevard	
	4.0	6.4	To US 41 (Veterans Boulevard)	
	4.3	6.9	I-75 (SR 93) – Naples, Tampa	Exit 170 on I-75
	5.3	8.5	CR 769 north	Continuation into Desoto County
1.000 mi = 1.609 km; 1.000 km = 0.621 mi

== County Road 771 ==
County Road 771
- Location: Placida–Gasparilla Island
- Length: 11.1 mi (17.9 km)

County Road 771 is Gasparilla Road running from Gasparilla Island to a point historically known as McCall (just south of the Myakka River).

=== Route description ===
Gasparilla Road begins on Gasparilla Island. The Charlotte County segment continues from a segment in Lee County, which begins in Boca Grande. From the county line, it heads north along Gasparilla Island for over a mile before crossing the Boca Grande Causeway to Placida on the mainland. Just north of the causeway at Placida Road (CR 775), Gasparilla Road turns south and then curves to the northeast. As it runs northeast, it passes the Coral Creek Airport and the Charlotte Harbor Preserve State Park. At Rotonda Boulevard, Gasparilla Road expands to four lanes. It heads north for another two miles before coming to its northern terminus at SR 776 (McCall Road).

=== History ===
Present-day Gasparilla Road was largely built from McCall to Placida in the early 1950s, was making it the second road connecting to Placida after SR 775. It was built on a route roughly paralleling the Seaboard Air Line Railroad's Boca Grande Subdivision, which was built by the Charlotte Harbor and Northern Railway and is now the Cape Haze Pioneer Trail. The road was designated as an extension of SR 771, which at the time ran north along the current route of SR 776 to Murdock (in northern Port Charlotte).

The Boca Grande Causeway was completed in 1958, and SR 771 was extended on to Gasparilla Island. In the 1980s, SR 771 was relinquished to county control south of McCall and became CR 771. SR 771 north of McCall remained under state control and became part of SR 776.

CR 771 was officially named Gasparilla Road in 2003.

=== Major intersections ===
Location	mi	km	Destinations	Notes
Gasparilla Island	0.0	0.0	CR 771 south (Gasparilla Road)	Continuation into Lee County
Gasparilla Sound	1.4– 2.8	2.3– 4.5	Boca Grande Causeway	
Placida	3.3	5.3	CR 775 north (Placida Road)	
	8.9	14.3	Rotonda Boulevard	
Charlotte Beach	11.1	17.9	SR 776 (South McCall Road) – South Venice, Port Charlotte	
1.000 mi = 1.609 km; 1.000 km = 0.621 mi

== County Road 775 ==
County Road 775
- Location: Placida–Englewood
- Length: 9.0 mi (14.5 km)

County Road 775 is Placida Road running from Placida to Englewood.

=== Route description ===
Placida Road begins in Placida on Cape Haze. Its southern terminus is at CR 771 (Gasparilla Road) near Boca Grande Causeway. From CR 771, Placida Road heads northwest as a two-lane road passing between the coast and Rotonda West. Just before Rotonda Boulevard, Placida Road expands to four lanes and passes through Grove City. It then enters Englewood and cones to its northern terminus at SR 776.

=== History ===
Placida was originally designated SR 173. It became SR 775 during the 1945 Florida state road renumbering. When first designated, SR 775 continued north from Englewood to US 41 in South Venice along the present route of SR 776. After SR 775 south of Englewood was relinquished to county control in the 1980s, the northern segment became part of SR 776.

=== Major intersections ===
Location	mi	km	Destinations	Notes
Placida	0.0	0.0	CR 771 (Gasparilla Road / Boca Grande Causeway)	
Rotonda West	4.7	7.6	Rotonda Boulevard	
Englewood	9.0	14.5	SR 776 (South McCall Road) – South Venice, Port Charlotte	
1.000 mi = 1.609 km; 1.000 km = 0.621 mi

== County Road 776 ==
County Road 776
- Location: Manasota Key–Englewood, Charlotte Harbor–Harbour Heights
- Length: 7.5 mi (12.1 km)

County Road 776 exists in two discontinuous segments. The western segment is Beach Road connecting Manasota Key with Englewood, which is unsigned. The eastern segment is Harborview Road, which runs from US 41 in Charlotte Harbor to Harbour Heights. Both segments were previously designated as discontinuous segments of SR 776 before being relinquished to county control in the 1980s.

== County Road 776A ==
County Road 776A
- Location: Charlotte Harbor
- Length: 0.9 mi (1,400 m)

County Road 776A is Melbourne street in Charlotte Harbor.
