= Florida State Road 776 =

State highway in Florida, United States

State Road 776

Route information
- Maintained by FDOT
- Length: 24.689 mi (39.733 km)

Major junctions
- North end: US 41 near South Venice
- CR 777 in Englewood
- East end: US 41 at Murdock

Location
- Country: United States
- State: Florida
- Counties: Sarasota, Charlotte

Highway system
- Florida State Highway System; Interstate; US; State; Former; Pre‑1945; Toll; Scenic
← SR 768	→ SR 777

State Road 776 (SR 776) is a 25-mile-long (40 km) state highway serving southern Sarasota County and northwestern Charlotte County, Florida. It acts as a loop road of U.S. Route 41 (US 41) that bypasses North Port.

== Route description ==
SR 776 begins at an intersection with US 41/SR 45 (Tamiami Trail) in South Venice. From US 41, SR 776 travels southwest along Englewood Road through Woodmere before entering the community of Englewood. At Old Englewood Road, SR 776 becomes North Indiana Avenue and it continues south through Englewood. In central Englewood, SR 776 intersects Dearborn Street (CR 777), which runs northeast to North Port.

SR 776 continues south and while still in Englewood, it crosses into Charlotte County, where it becomes South McCall Road. Just south of Beach Road, it turns east and comes to an intersection with Placida Road (CR 775), which runs south to the community of Placida on Cape Haze. SR 776 continues its east trajectory from here, passing just north of Rotonda West before coming to an area historically known as McCall. Here, SR 776 intersects Gasparilla Road (CR 771), which runs south to Boca Grande on Gasparilla Island.

Just past CR 771 near Charlotte Beach, more commonly known as Gulf Cove, SR 776 turns to the northeast. It crosses the Myakka River and enters El Jobean. From here, SR 776 is known as El Jobean Road. As it approaches Port Charlotte, SR 776 passes Charlotte Sports Park, the spring training home of the Tampa Bay Rays. In Port Charlotte, it passes Port Charlotte Town Center before coming to its eastern terminus with US 41 (Tamiami Trail) in Murdock, just south of North Port.

While SR 776 ends at US 41, the road continues east as Veterans Boulevard, an undesignated county road which heads east to Kings Highway (CR 769) near Interstate 75.

== History ==
The current route of SR 776 was built from the late 1800s to the late 1920s and has had different designations over the years. On the west end, Englewood Road was one of Englewood's early streets when the area was platted in 1896. Englewood Road (via present-day Old Englewood Road), Dearborn Street, and River Road were part of an early segment of the Tamiami Trail through Englewood. By the 1930s, the Tamiami Trail was rerouted to its current route further north bypassing Englewood. The original route was then designated as SR 311.

McCall Road from Englewood east originally served McCall, a town that was platted on the Myakka River by the Charlotte Harbor and Northern Railway in 1909. The railroad named the town after C.B. McCall, one of their passenger agents at Boca Grande. In 1928, the road was extended from McCall northeast over the Myakka River with a wooden bridge built next to the Charlotte Harbor and Northern Railway (which by then was owned by the Seaboard Air Line Railroad). It connected the road to the town of El Jobean, which had been developed in 1923 on a tract of land previously known as Southland. The road would then run from El Jobean northeast paralleling the railroad to Murdock, where it terminated at US 41 (Tamiami Trail) and completed the route. The route from Englewood east to McCall and Murdock was then designated as SR 181.

After the 1945 Florida State Road renumbering, the east-west segment of the route from Englewood to McCall was designated as SR 776. The rest of the route from Englewood northwest to US 41 became part of SR 775, which also continued south along Placida Road to Placida on Cape Haze. East of McCall to Murdock, the route was designated as SR 771, which also continued southwest to Placida (and later Gasparilla Island) along Gasparilla Road.

In the early 1960s, the state road through Englewood was realigned to run along an extended Indiana Avenue. The former alignment is now Old Englewood Road north of Dearborn Street and McCall Road south of Dearborn Street to the Charlotte County line.

In the 1980s, the Florida Department of Transportation relinquished both SR 771 and SR 775 south of SR 776 to county control. The remaining state-controlled segments of both routes then became part of SR 776, making the continuous route that is in place today.

The railroad paralleling El Jobean Road was abandoned in 1981. El Jobean Road was widened into the former railroad right of way between Murdock and El Jobean in the 1990s. The rest of SR 776 was widened to four lanes in the 1990s and early 2000s.

=== Bridge over Myakka River ===
In 1959, the original wooden bridge over the Myakka River near El Jobean was replaced with a two-lane concrete bridge. A second two-lane bridge was built in 2001 when the road was widened to four lanes. The 2001 bridge carries westbound traffic and the 1959 bridge carries eastbound traffic.

== Major intersections ==
County	Location	mi	km	Destinations	Notes
Sarasota		0.000	0.000	US 41 (Tamiami Trail / SR 45) – Venice, North Port	Western terminus
Sarasota		0.726	1.168	To I-75 / Jacaranda Boulevard (CR 765 north)	
Sarasota		2.332	3.753	Manasota Beach Road (CR 774 west) - Gulf Beaches	
Sarasota	Englewood	4.790	7.709	Old Englewood Road (CR 775A south) - Olde Englewood Village	
Sarasota	Englewood	7.114	11.449	To I-75 / Dearborn Street (CR 775A north / CR 777 north) – North Port, Business District, Englewood Sports Complex, Indian Mound Park, Lemon Bay Park	
Charlotte		8.583	13.813	Beach Road (CR 776 west) - Englewood Beach, Stump Pass Beach State Park	
Charlotte		9.377	15.091	CR 775 south (Placida Road) to Pine Street north north / I-75 – Placida, Boca Grande	Northern terminus of CR 775; southern terminus of Pine Street
Charlotte		11.450	18.427	To I-75 / Winchester Boulevard	
Charlotte	Charlotte Beach	16.543	26.623	CR 771 south (Gasparilla Road) / Sailors Way north – Placida, Rotonda West, Boca Grande, Boca Grande Lighthouse	Northern terminus of CR 771; southern terminus of Sailors Way
Charlotte		23.608	37.993	To I-75 / Toledo Blade Boulevard	
Charlotte	Murdock	24.689	39.733	US 41 (SR 45) – North Port, Port Charlotte	Eastern terminus
1.000 mi = 1.609 km; 1.000 km = 0.621 mi

== Related Roads ==
=== County Road 776 (Manasota Key) ===
County Road 776
- Location: Manasota Key–Englewood
- Length: 3.1 mi (5.0 km)

County Road 776 is the unsigned designation for Beach Road connecting Manasota Key with Englewood. It runs from SR 776 in Englewood across the Tom Adams Bridge to Manasota Key. It then runs north along Manasota Key to the Sarasota County line. It continues into Sarasota County as Manasota Key Road. Beach Road east of Gulf Boulevard was previously designated as a discontinuous segment of SR 776 before being relinquished to county control in the 1980s.

The route came into existence in 1927, when the road's first bridge to Manasota Key was built. It was initially designated SR 534 before becoming SR 776 during the 1945 Florida State Road renumbering. The current Tom Adams Bridge was built in 1965, replacing the original bridge.

=== County Road 776 (Charlotte Harbor) and State Road 754 ===
County Road 776
- Location: Charlotte Harbor–Harbour Heights
- Length: 3.5 mi (5.6 km)

State Road 754
- Length: 0.9 mi (1,400 m)

County Road 776, locally known as Harborview Road, runs from US 41 in Charlotte Harbor to Harbour Heights. From its western terminus, Harborview Road heads east and runs along the north side of the Peace River. It has an interchange with Interstate 75 before coming to its terminus at Harbour Heights.

Harborview Road became prominent in the 1950s during the development of Harbour Heights. Harborview Road was designated as a discontinuous segment of SR 776 prior to being relinquished to county control in the 1980s.

In 2025, a segment of the road that included the interchange with I-75 between mileposts 3.032 and 3.923 was acquired by the Florida Department of Transportation, but inventoried as State Road 754.

Major intersections

Location	mi	km	Destinations	Notes
Charlotte Harbor	0.0	0.0	US 41 (SR 45) – Punta Gorda, Port Charlotte	continues west as Edgewater Drive
Charlotte Harbor	0.2	0.32	CR 769 (Kings Highway)	
Charlotte Harbor	0.9	1.4	CR 776A (Melbourne Street)	
	3.0	4.8	west end of SR 754	
	3.5	5.6	I-75 (SR 93) – Naples, Tampa	Exit 167 on I-75
	3.9	6.3	east end of SR 754	
Harbour Heights	4.4	7.1	Discovery Drive	continues east as Sunnybrook Road
1.000 mi = 1.609 km; 1.000 km = 0.621 mi

Browse numbered routes
← SR 752	SR 754	→ SR 758

=== County Road 776A ===
County Road 776A
- Location: Charlotte Harbor
- Length: 0.9 mi (1,400 m)

County Road 776A is Melbourne street in Charlotte Harbor. It is only a mile long and runs from Harborview Road (CR 776) south to US 41 just north of the bridges over the Peace River. It was previously SR 776A before being relinquished to county control in the 1980s.
