= List of bridges documented by the Historic American Engineering Record in Florida =

This is a list of bridges documented by the Historic American Engineering Record in the US state of Florida.

== Bridges ==
Survey No.	Name (as assigned by HAER)	Status	Type	Built	Documented	Carries	Crosses	Location	County	Coordinates
FL-2	Seven Mile Bridge	Extant	Swing span	1912	1979	US 1 (Overseas Highway) (former)	Moser Channel	Marathon	Monroe	24°41′54″N 81°10′36″W
FL-3	Seddon Island Scherzer Rolling Lift Bridge	Replaced	Rolling lift (Scherzer) bascule	1909	1983	Beneficial Drive	Garrison Channel	Tampa	Hillsborough	27°56′28″N 82°26′58″W
FL-8-C	Cape Canaveral Air Force Station, Haulover Canal Bridge	Extant	Simple trunnion bascule	1965	2013	Kennedy Parkway North	Haulover Canal	Cape Canaveral	Brevard	28°44′11″N 80°45′17″W
FL-12	Apalachicola River Bridge	Extant	Cantilever	1937	1995	SR 20 westbound	Apalachicola River	Blountstown	Calhoun	30°26′14″N 85°00′04″W
FL-13	Caryville Bridge	Replaced	Rolling lift (Scherzer) bascule	1927	1997	US 90 / SR 10	Choctawhatchee River	Caryville	Washington	30°46′33″N 85°49′38″W
FL-14	Palm Valley Bridge	Replaced	Simple trunnion bascule	1937	2000	CR 210	Intracoastal Waterway	Ponte Vedra Beach	St. Johns	30°07′58″N 81°23′07″W
FL-22	Mathers Bridge	Extant	Swing span	1927	2003	CR 3	Banana River	Merritt Island	Brevard	28°08′57″N 80°36′22″W
FL-26	Marquis Bayou Bridge	Replaced	Reinforced concrete T-beam	1937	2012	US 90 / SR 10	Marquis Bayou	East Milton	Santa Rosa	30°37′38″N 87°01′48″W
FL-28	Boca Grande Swing Bridge	Replaced	Swing span	1958	2013	CR 771	Gasparilla Sound	Placida	Charlotte	26°49′00″N 82°16′25″W
