= Cape Haze Pioneer Trail =

Rail trail in Charlotte County, Florida, US

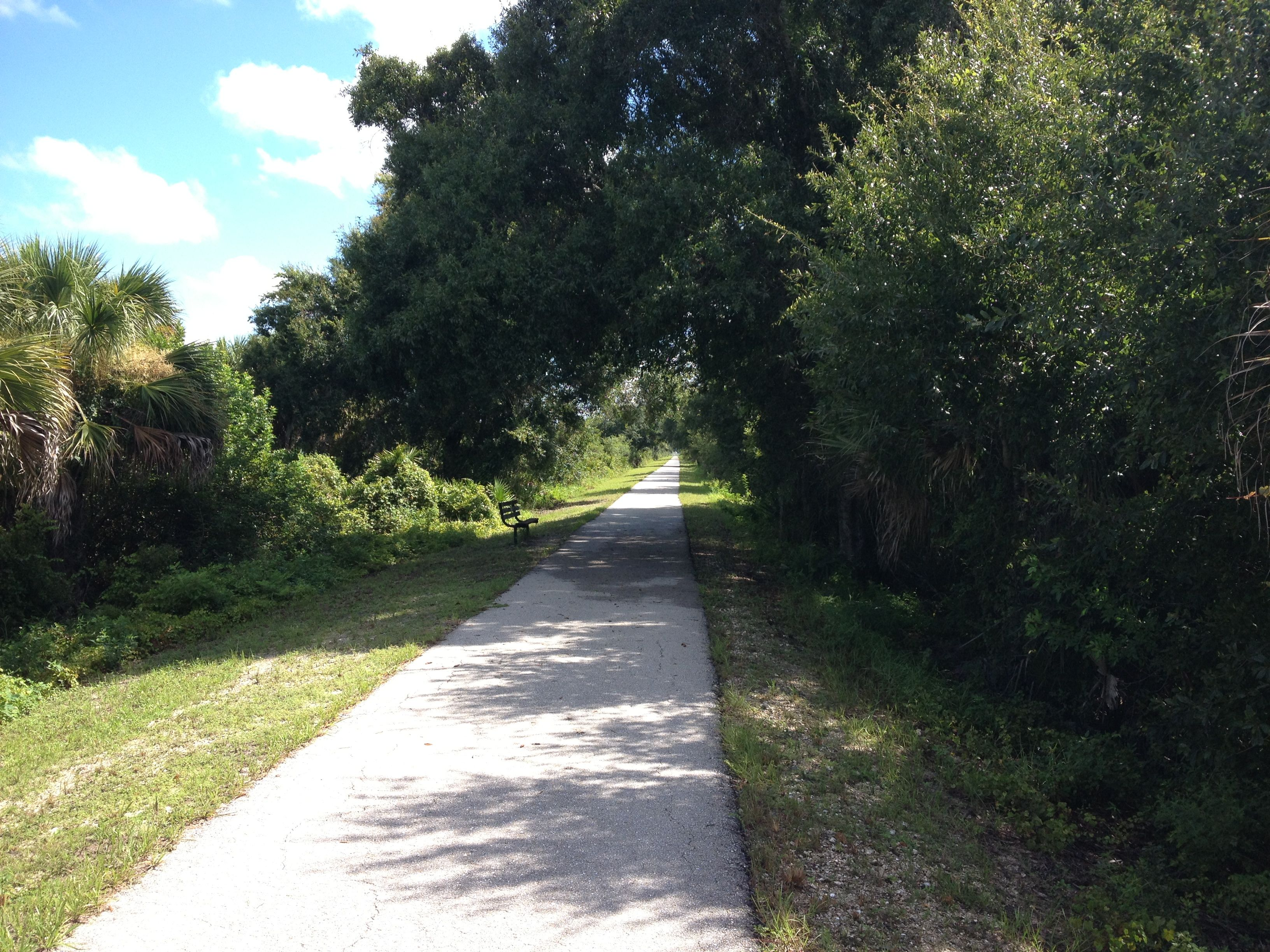
- Length: 8 mi (13 km)
- Location: Placida, Florida, United States
- Established: 1999
- Trailheads: North: 26.9329°N 82.2262°W; Pinedale Drive and South McCall Road; South: 26.8335°N 82.2653°W; Placidia Road and Boca Grande Causeway
- Season: Year round
- Hazards: Weather
- Surface: Asphalt
- Right of way: Charlotte Harbor and Northern Railway

Trail map
- Map of the Cape Haze Pioneer Trail

The Cape Haze Pioneer Trail is an 8-mile (13 km) rail trail in Charlotte County, Florida, on the Cape Haze peninsula running from western Port Charlotte to Placida. A vast majority of the trail runs along the right of way of the former Charlotte Harbor and Northern Railway.

== Route description ==
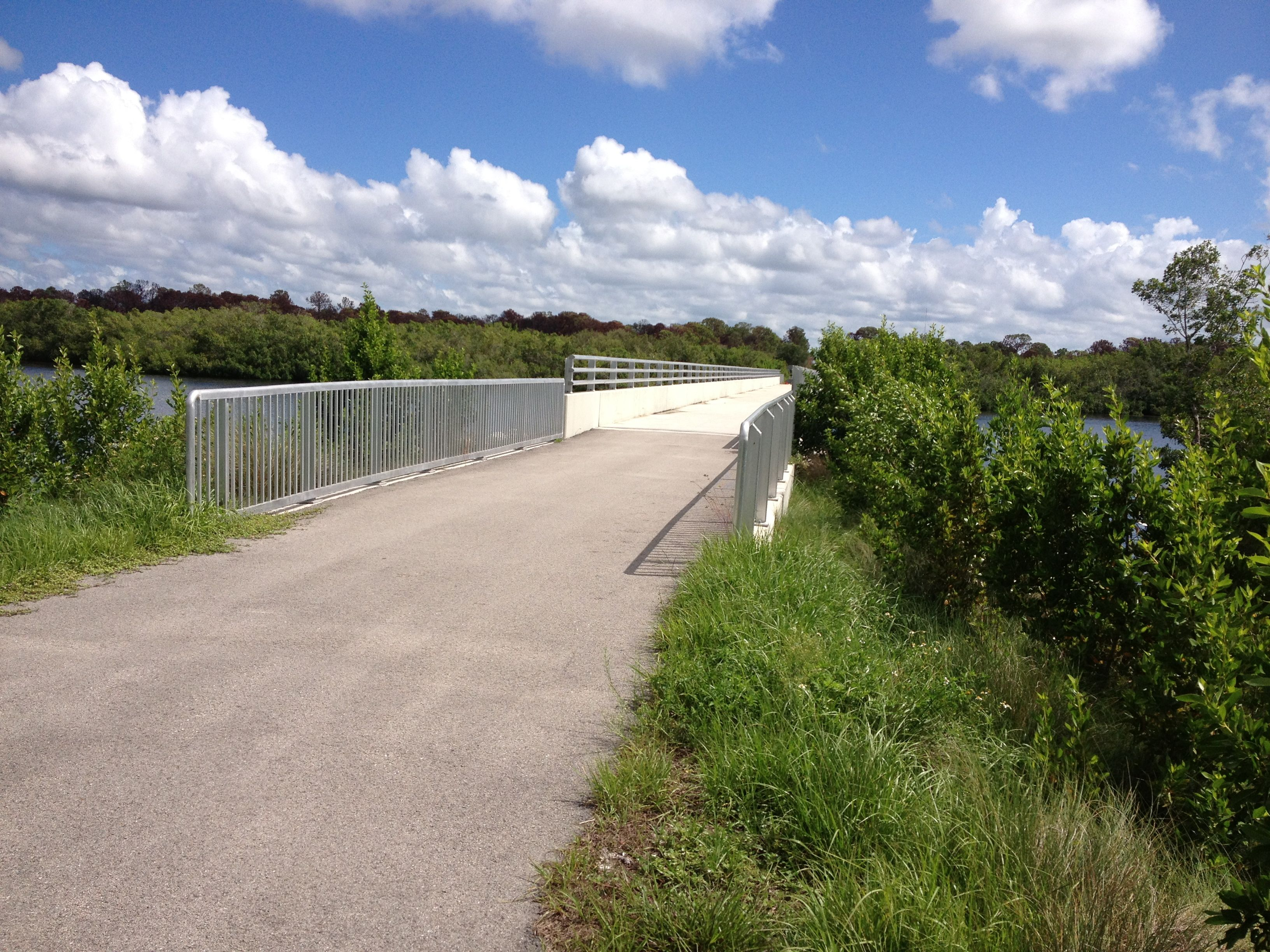
Trail crossing Coral Creek

The trail begins at the intersection of State Road 776 and Pinedale Drive in western Port Charlotte. It runs south along Pinedale Drive briefly before shifting east on to the former railroad corridor. It then proceeds south along the railroad corridor, passing near Rotonda West and crossing over Coral Creek near Coral Creek Airport. At the Coral Creek Country Club, the trail leaves the railroad corridor and runs alongside County Road 771 to Placida, terminating just north of the Boca Grande Causeway.

From here, bicyclists can continue across the causeway to Gasparilla Island and the Boca Grande Bike Path (which runs along the island portion of the railroad corridor).

== History ==
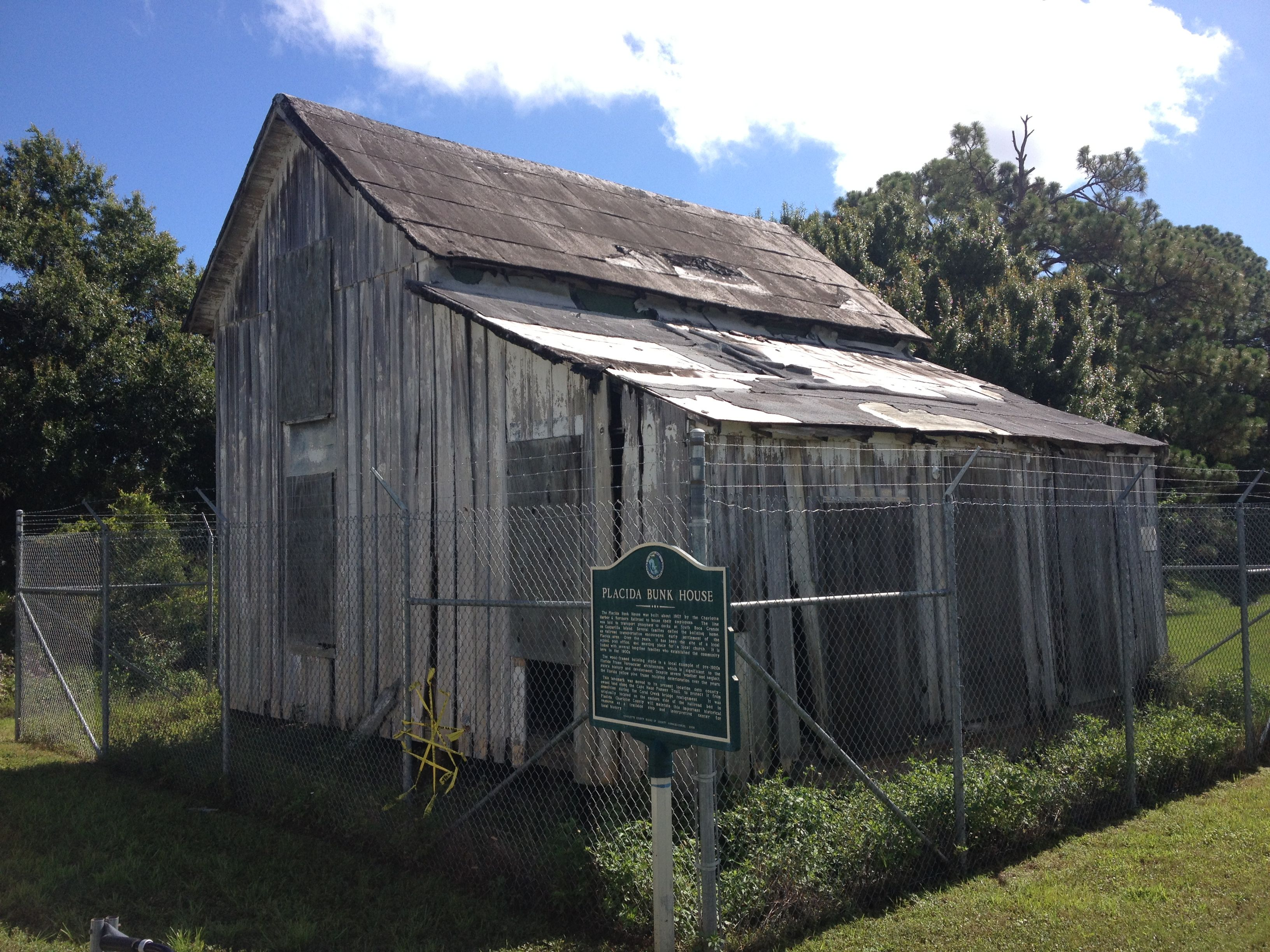
Placida Bunk House on display at northern trailhead. It was built by the railroad to house their employees and originally stood in Placida along the rail line.

The Charlotte Harbor and Northern Railway, which served Gasparilla Island, existed from 1907 until 1981. Charlotte County gained ownership of the right of way in 1985, and the first portion of the trail was built in 1999 from the Mercer trailhead to Rotonda Boulevard. It was extended over Coral Creek to the Coral Creek Golf Club in 2005. The southernmost portion along County Road 771 from Coral Creek Country Club to Placida was completed in 2010.

Originally, the trail was planned to continue along the railroad corridor all the way to Placida before the Coral Creek Country Club was built, which used up a portion of the corridor. The remaining portion was built along County Road 771. A new bridge carrying CR 771 over Coral Creek was built to accommodate bicycle and pedestrian traffic as part of the trail extension in 2010.

== See also ==
- Wildflower Preserve
