= Coral Creek Airport =

Private airport in Florida, U.S.

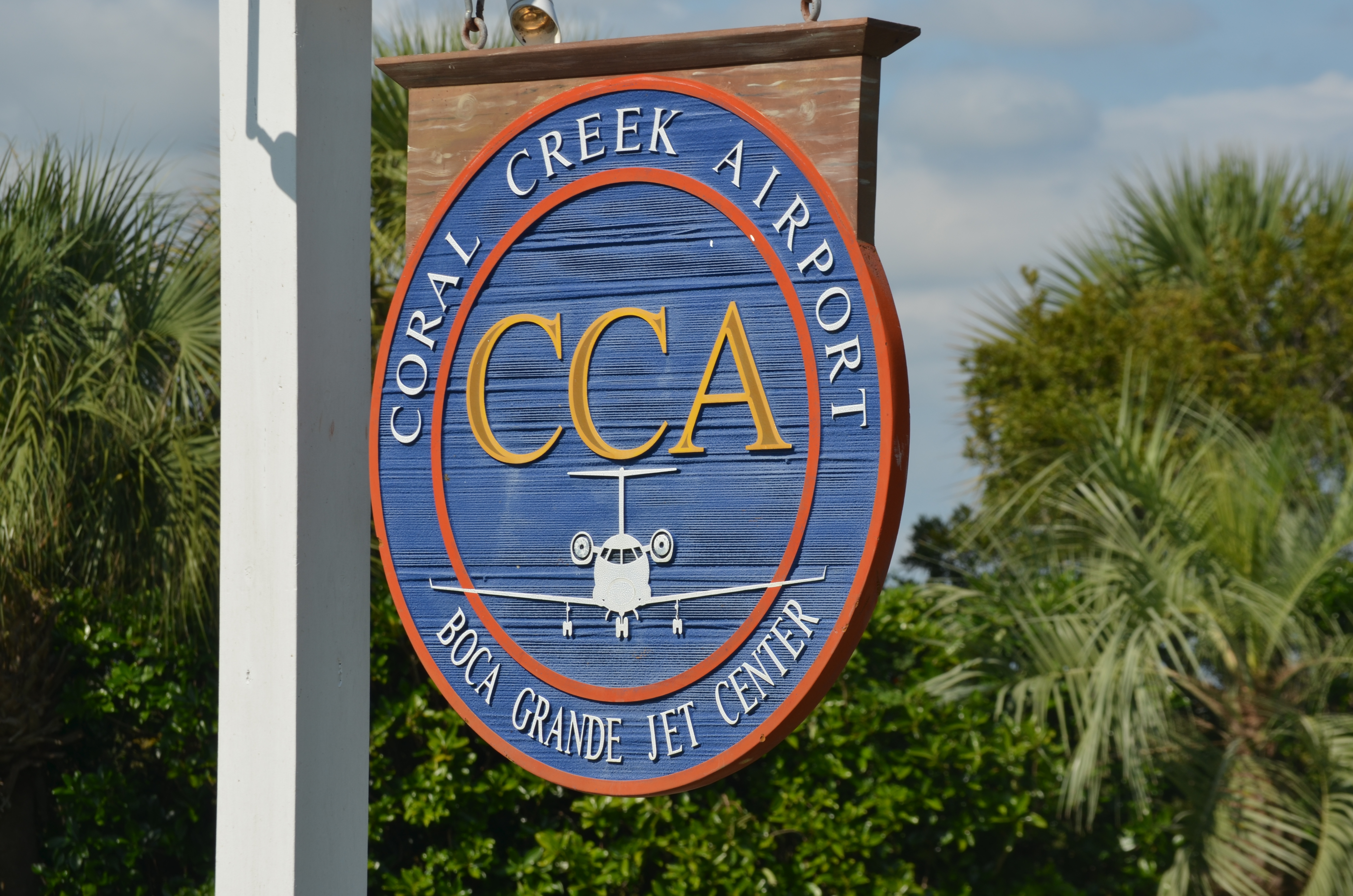
- Wooden sign at the main entrance of the property
- IATA: none; ICAO: none; FAA LID: FA54

Summary
- Airport type: Private
- Owner: BK IV AS, L.L.C.
- Location: Placida, Florida
- Opened: Mid-1960s
- Elevation AMSL: 7 ft (2.1 m)
- Coordinates: 26°51′13″N 082°15′10″W
- Website: http://www.coralcreekairport.com/
- Interactive map of Coral Creek Airport

Runways
Direction	Length		Surface
Direction	ft	m	Surface
05/23	6,000	1,829	Asphalt

Coral Creek Airport (FAA LID: FA54) is a private-use airport located 2 miles (3 km) northeast of Boca Grande, a community on Gasparilla Island in southwest Florida, United States. The airport itself is located in Placida in Charlotte County (specifically, on the Cape Haze Peninsula), about a mile north of the separately-owned Coral Creek Club. The airport is privately owned by BK IV AS, L.L.C.

The airfield is composed of a single asphalt runway connected to a ramp and two hangars via a single taxiway. There is one FBO for the airport, known as "Boca Grande Jet Center," in which the name sign and logo were created by Charles Wittmaak during the extension of the runway. The office is attached to the main hangar which is connected to the public road by a private driveway.

Services for the airport are restricted to members only with limited guest accommodations. Permission is needed to land. The pattern is uncontrolled (there is no air traffic control tower).

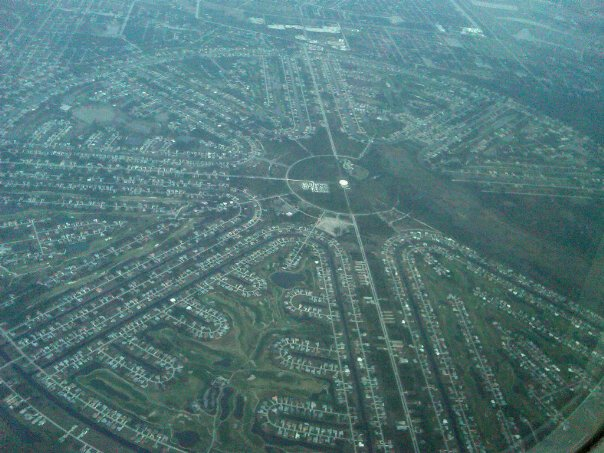
Rotonda West residential development project, located a few miles northwest of the airport

== History ==
Coral Creek Airport opened as Rotonda International Airport in the mid-1960s. It was purchased in 2003 and, subsequently, made private.

In 2012, under new ownership, the 6000 foot runway, currently in place, was surfaced.

In the late hours of May 20, 2013, a group of burglars cut through a section of wire fence along the perimeter to gain entry onto the property. Using three large trucks, they left damage, stole a large quantity of diesel fuel, as well as a fuel pump. The group was unable to get inside the locked hangars. Upon leaving, one of the trucks had gotten stuck in mud caused by recent heavy rainfall and a front-end loader was used to free the vehicle. Repairs were made to the damaged areas of the airport and regular service was quickly back underway, as was the expansion project taking place at the time.

The expansion project saw the addition of a second hangar, now typically used for long-term car and plane storage. Total hangar area is 17,140 square feet.

== Facilities ==
The runway is lit by pilot-controlled, medium intensity runway edge lights with PAPIs on the north and south ends. A rotating beacon light is located on the main hangar. Weather is reported via an AWOS III P/T station.

Both of the hangars are capable of holding Gulfstream/Global aircraft. There are six GA tiedowns on the ramp.

Boca Grande Jet Center is a full-service FBO that offers Jet-A, Jet-A w/ Prist, 100LL, GPU, and LAV. There are kitchen and shower facilities on the property, as well as internet in the main FBO office.

The FBO can also arrange rental cars and catering.

== Activities ==
Due to the private nature of the airport and because it serves members on demand, it is difficult to gather a consistent schedule or number of movements. Takeoffs and landings can range from few to several on any given day. Generally, peak season occurs between October and June, the period of business for the nearby Gasparilla Inn (whose guests are given limited access to the airport).

Neither the airport nor the airspace is used for training purposes.

== Aircraft ==
Common aircraft operating at the airport include:

- Beechcraft
  - Super King Air
- Bombardier
  - Challenger
  - Global
  - Learjet
- Cessna
  - Citation
- Dassault
  - Falcon
- Embraer
  - Phenom
  - Legacy
- Gulfstream
- Hawker Beechcraft
- North American
  - Sabre 65
- Piaggio
  - Avanti

The runway can accommodate aircraft with a gross weight up to 100,000 lbs.

While the airport does store aircraft when members fly in, there are none permanently based at the airport. All aircraft are privately owned or chartered by members.

== Gallery ==
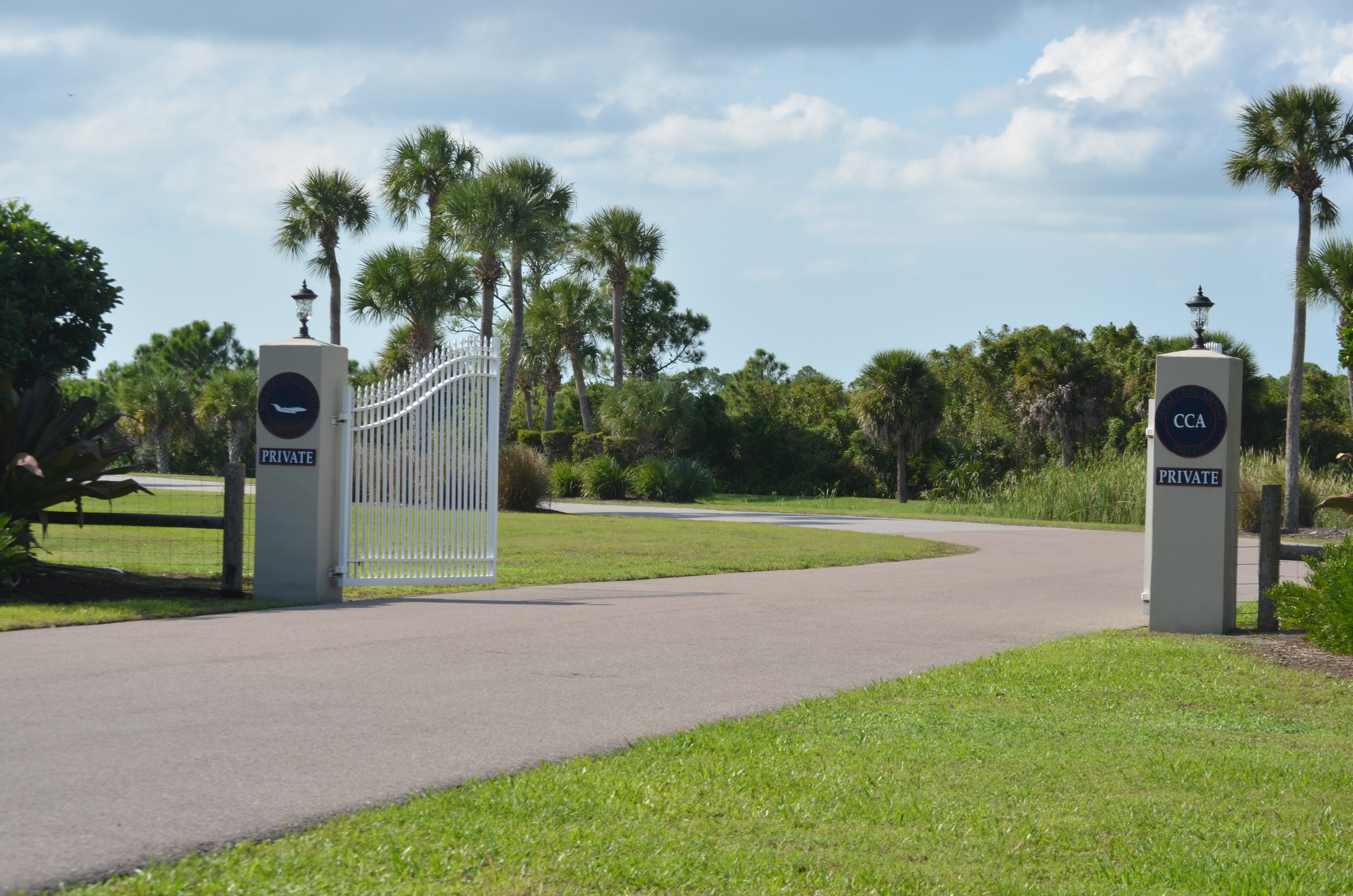
Main entrance

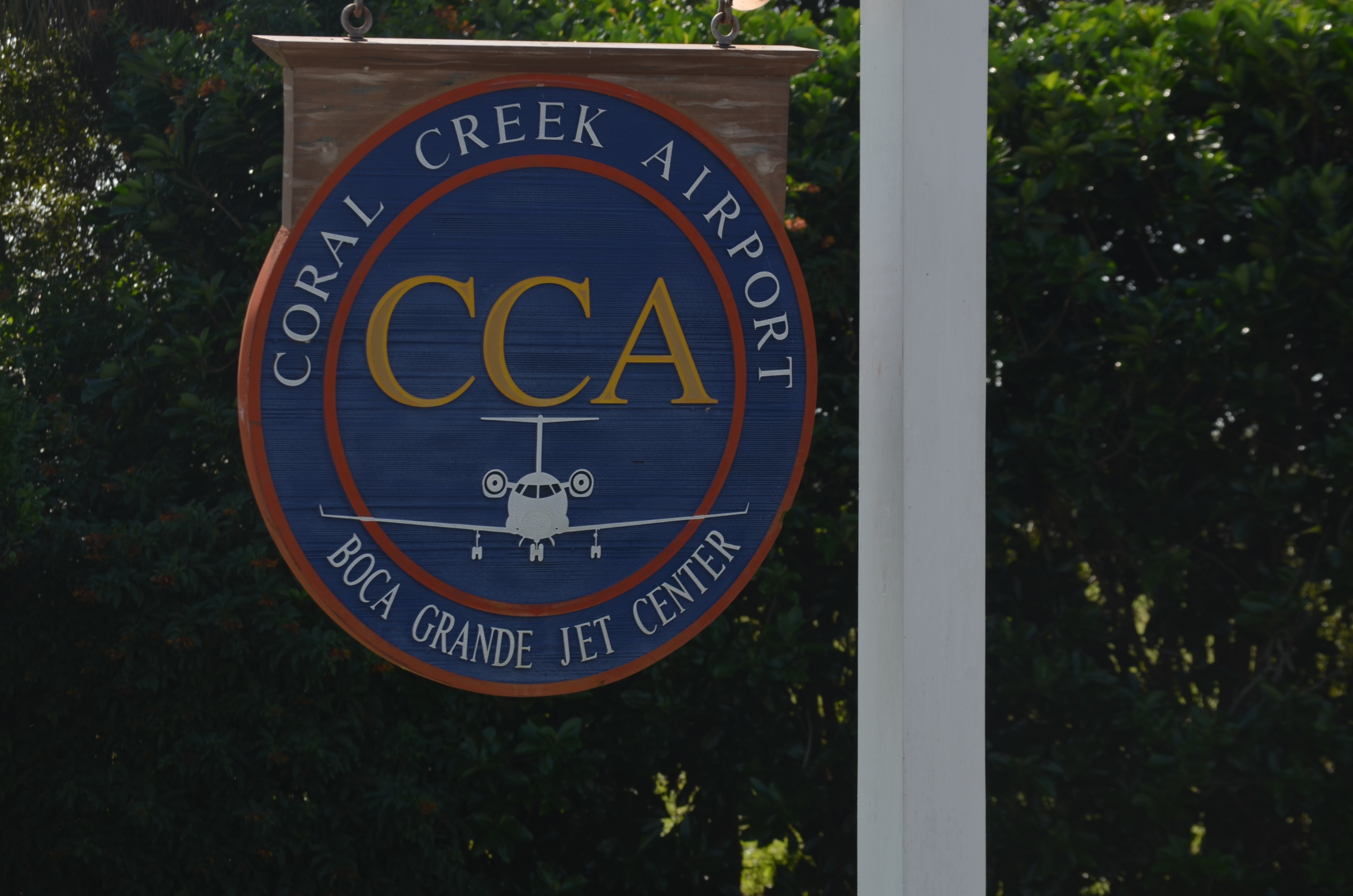
Wooden sign (north-facing)

== See also ==
- Boca Grande Causeway – vehicular access from Placida to Boca Grande about 2 miles south of the airport
- Cape Haze Pioneer Trail – rail trail that comes near the beginning of runway 05
- Flexjet – fractional carrier that regularly flies into the airport
- List of airports in Florida
- NetJets – another popular carrier at Coral Creek
- Spirit of St. Louis Airport – BK IV AS, L.L.C. office
- Wheels Up – another popular carrier at Coral Creek
