= Tom Adams Bridge =

- Coordinates: 26°56′03.80″N 82°021′11.10″W
- Carries: CR 776 (Beach Road)
- Crosses: Lemon Bay
- Locale: Englewood, Florida
- Maintained by: Charlotte County Public Works

Characteristics
- Design: Concrete bridge with bascule span
- Clearance above: 20 feet (6.1 m)

History
- Opened: Original bridge: 1927; Current Bridge: 1965

Statistics
- Toll: None

Location
- Interactive map of Tom Adams Bridge

The Tom Adams Bridge is a bridge in northern Charlotte County, Florida. It is a double-leaf bascule bridge that carries Beach Road (CR 776) from the mainland in Englewood to Sandpiper Key with another bridge connecting the route to Manasota Key. The bridge is named for Thomas Burton Adams Jr., who served as Secretary of State of Florida and Lieutenant Governor. The Tom Adams Bridge is one of two bridge crossings providing access to Manasota Key, with the other crossing existing further north in Sarasota County.

== History ==
The first set of bridges at the site connecting Englewood to Manasota Key via Sandpiper Key were built privately by the Chadwick family in 1927. The Chadwick family, who owned large amounts of property on Manasota Key, charged a 50 cent toll to cross the bridge. The bridges later came under control of Charlotte County in the 1930s.

By the late 1940s, the original east bridge was in bad condition. The bridge was rebuilt in the early 1950s largely using the same pilings. The reconstruction was complete in 1952, and the bridge was officially named the Leo Wotitzky Bridge. It was named after Florida Congressman Leo Wotitzky, who lobbied for the reconstruction of the bridge.

The current Tom Adams Bridge was built in 1965. The bridge included a drawbridge because Lemon Bay had since become part of the Intracoastal Waterway.

After the Tom Adams Bridge opened, Charlotte County Commissioner Bill Anger successfully lobbied to keep parts of the previous bridge as fishing piers. Though in the 1980s, the piers were closed due to deterioration, and a new pier was built on the same footprint on the east side. The pier is named for Bill Anger. Some of the former bridge's pilings can still be seen in the water near the bridge and pier.

The bridge connecting Sandpiper Key to Manasota Key was replaced with the current structure in 1980. This bridge is officially named the Swepston Bridge after the founder of the Lemon Bay Conservancy, Dr. Emil Swepston.

The Tom Adams Bridge was heavily rehabilitated in 2018, which included the construction of a new bridge tender house along with other improvements.
