= Boca Grande Causeway =

Bridge in Florida, United States of America

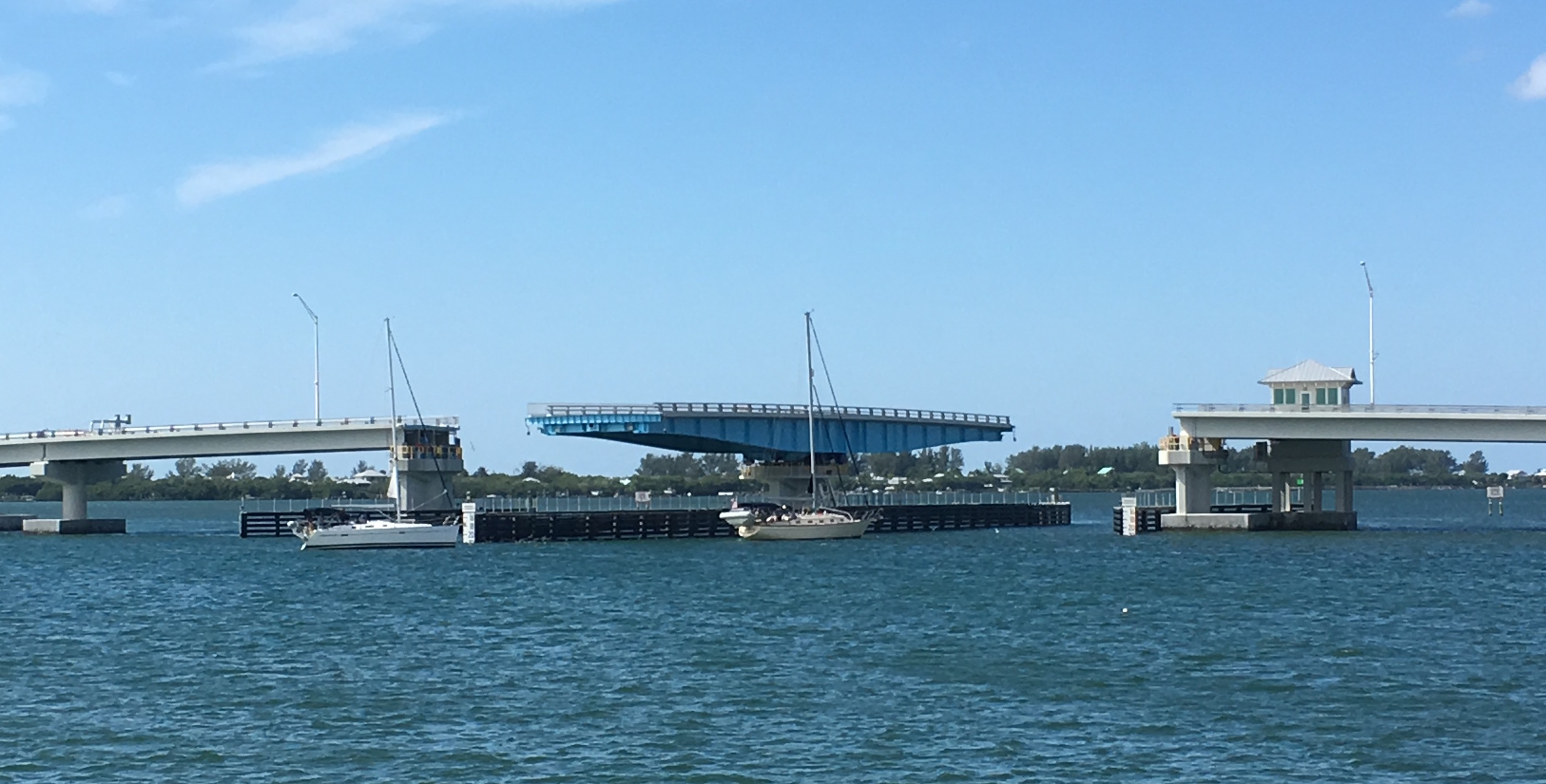
- Boca Grande Swing Bridge open for vessel traffic in 2016
- Coordinates: 26.81669°N 82.27364°W
- Carries: CR 771 (Gasparilla Road)
- Crosses: Gasparilla Sound
- Locale: Charlotte County, Florida
- Official name: Boca Grande Causeway
- Maintained by: Gasparilla Island Bridge Authority

Characteristics
- Design: 1 steel swing bridge and 2 concrete concrete girder bridges
- Total length: 2.5 miles (4.0 km)
- Clearance below: 22 feet (6.7 m) (north swing bridge); 25 feet (7.6 m) (center bridge); 16 feet (4.9 m) (south bridge)

History
- Opened: 1958 (original causeway and bridges); 2013-2015 (current bridges)

Statistics
- Toll: $6 (island-bound traffic only)

Location
- Interactive map of Boca Grande Causeway

The Boca Grande Causeway is a causeway located in Charlotte County, Florida, connecting the community of Boca Grande on Gasparilla Island with the mainland near Placida. The 2.5-mile (4.0 km) causeway crosses Gasparilla Sound and consists of three bridges, and is the only vehicular access to the island.

== History ==
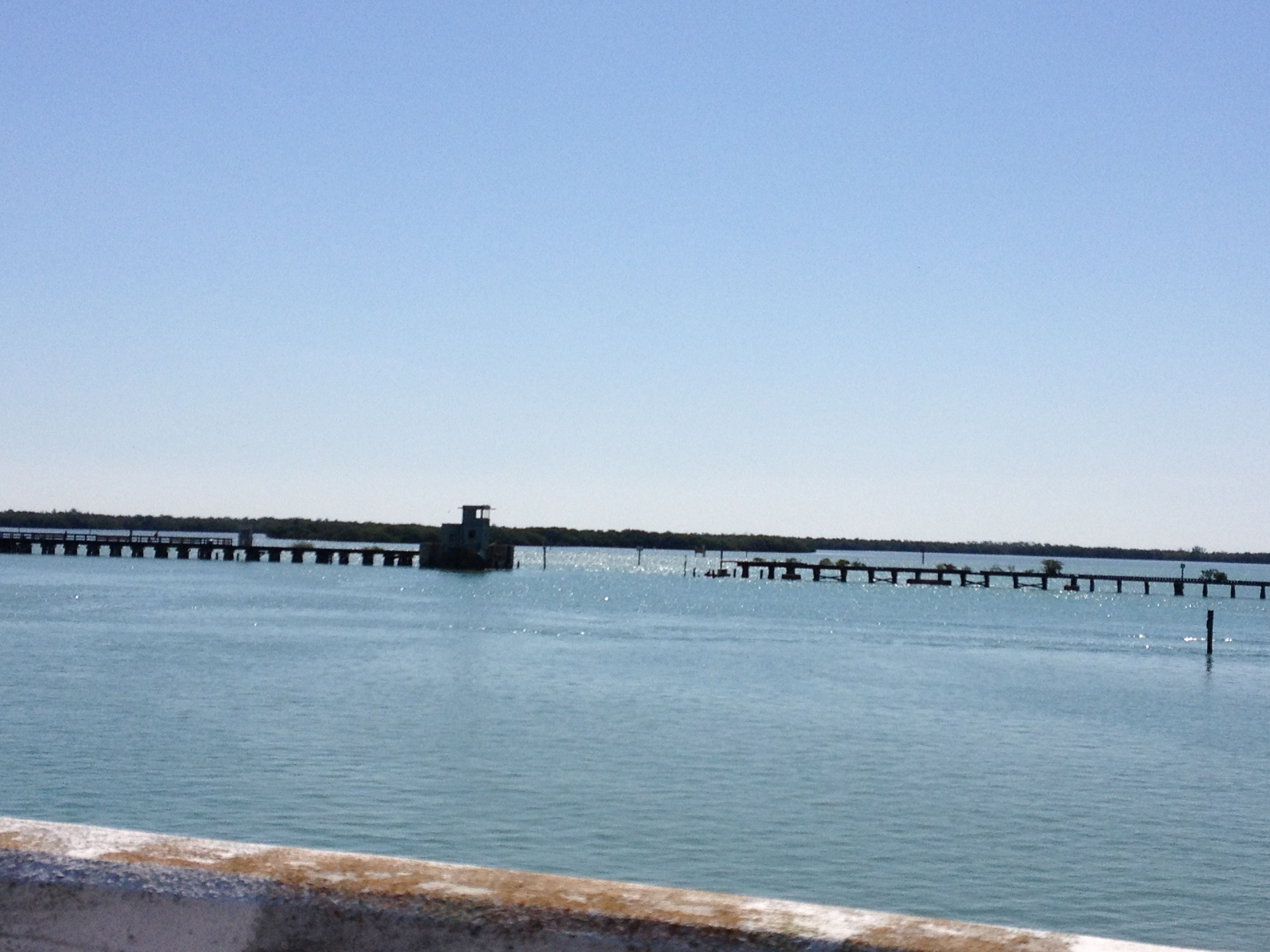
The causeway was built parallel to the now abandoned Charlotte Harbor & Northern Railway bridges

The Boca Grande Causeway originally opened in 1958 after six years of construction, replacing a vehicle ferry service. The causeway and its original bridges were built parallel to the now abandoned Charlotte Harbor and Northern Railway. Passenger rail service to the island was discontinued by the railroad shortly after the causeway opened. While the railroad was abandoned in 1981, the adjacent trestles remain mostly intact today and are visible from the causeway.

The Causeway was privately built, but was sold to the Gasparilla Island Bridge Authority, a government agency created to oversee operation of the causeway, in 1998. The northernmost bridge (connecting to the mainland) includes a 213-foot (65 m) swing span over the navigation channel. The swing bridge, which is one of a few remaining swing bridges in Florida, is 13 feet (4.0 m) tall at its highest point. The center and south bridges are fixed span bridges, and are 25 feet (7.6 m) and 12 feet (3.7 m) tall respectively.

The current center and south bridges were completed in 2013. The current swing bridge was completed and opened to traffic in late 2015. The original bridges were replaced due to their age and functional obsolescence. The current bridges are taller and also include shoulders for bicycle traffic allowing improved access for bicyclists using the popular Boca Grande Bike Path better access to the mainland and to the Cape Haze Pioneer Trail.

== Gallery ==
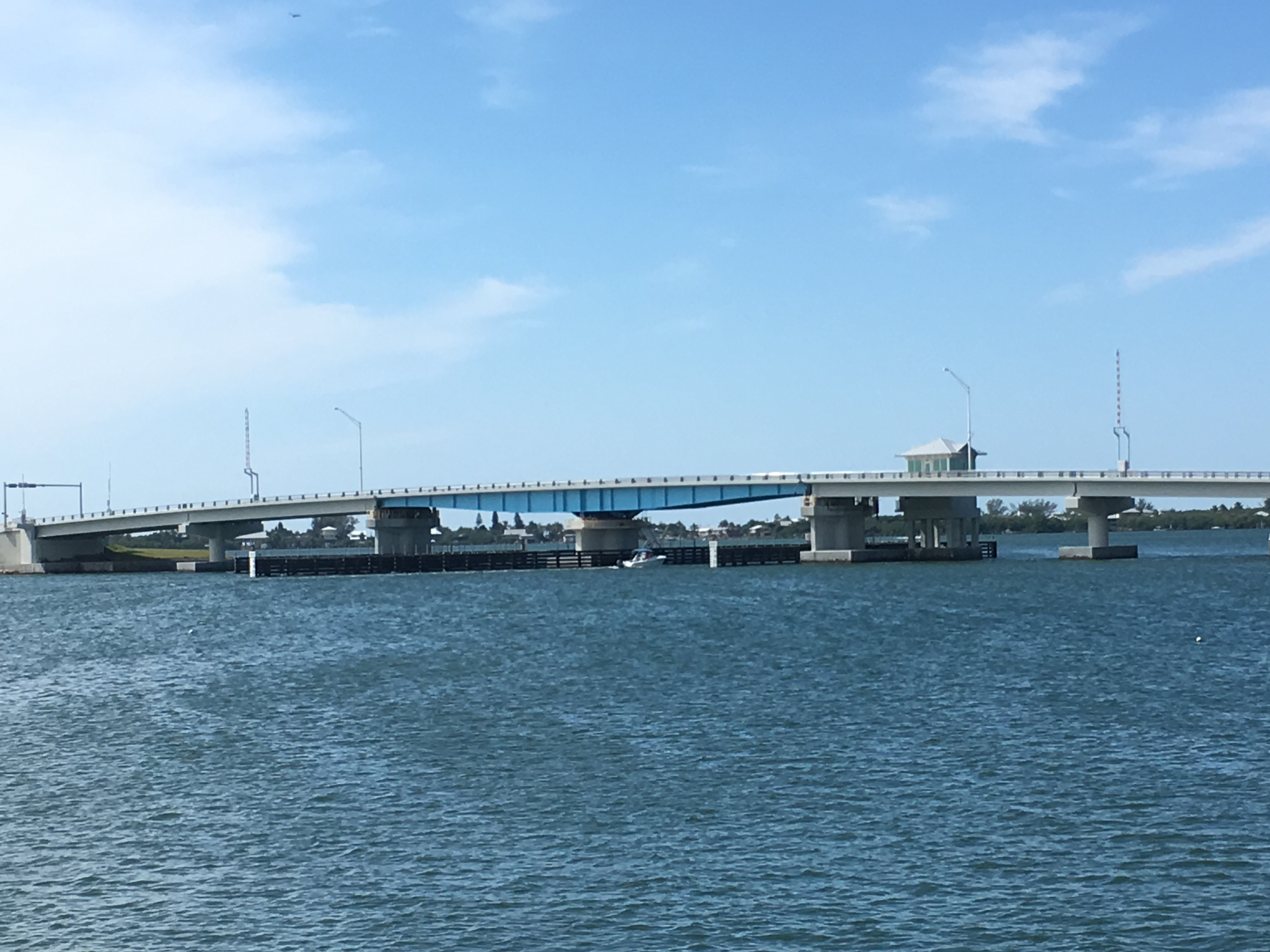
The north (swing) bridge

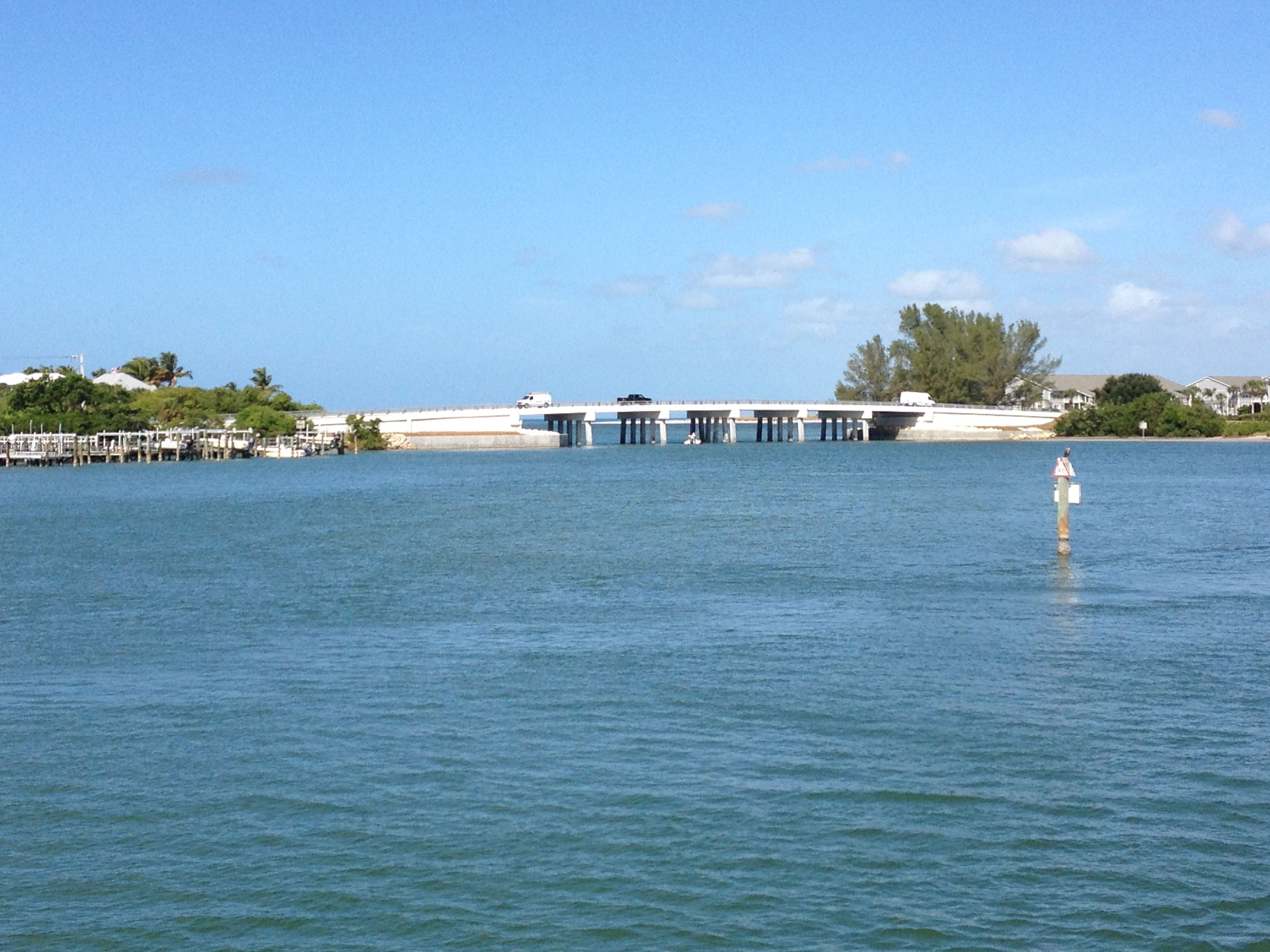
The south bridge

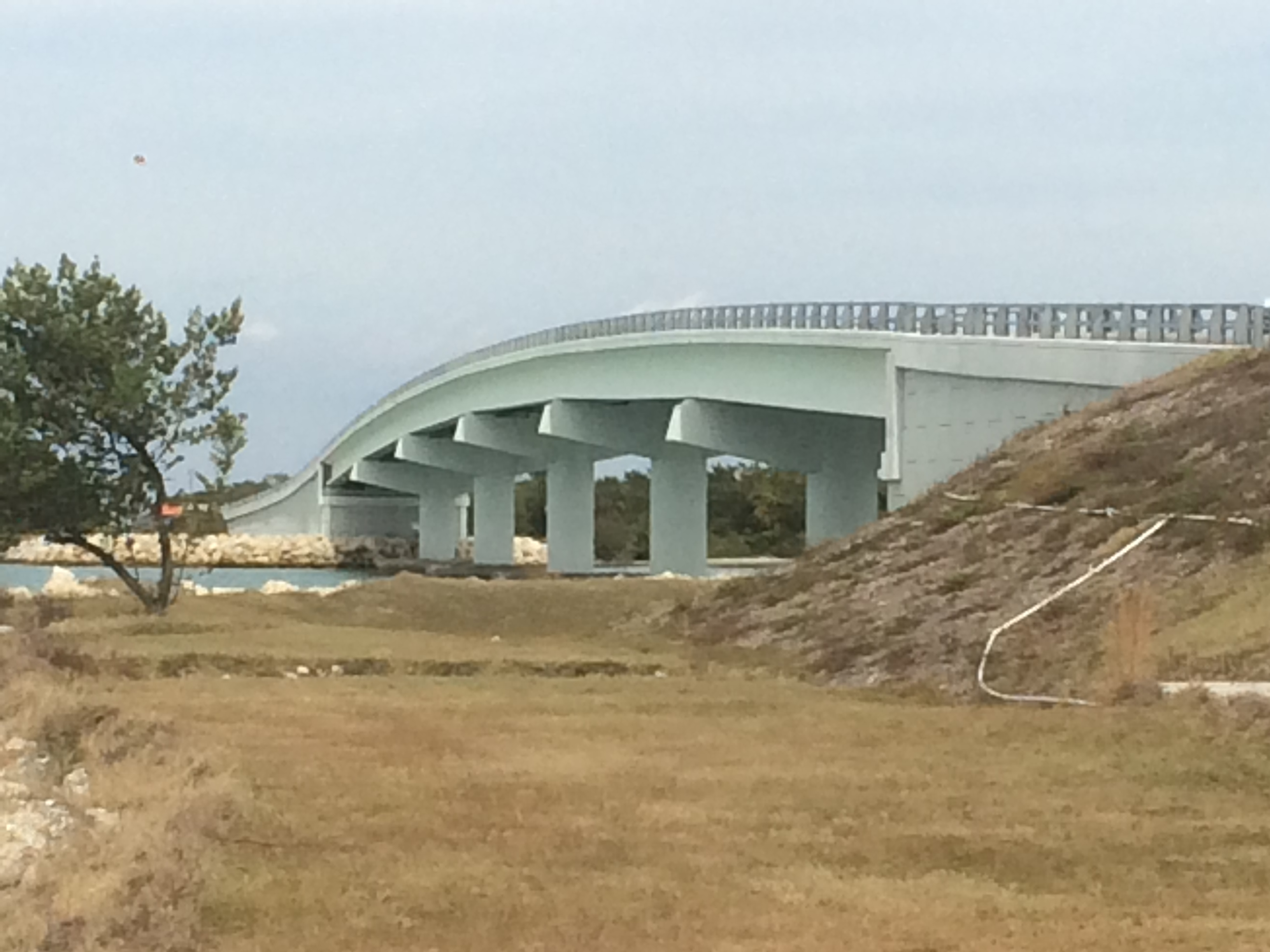
The center bridge

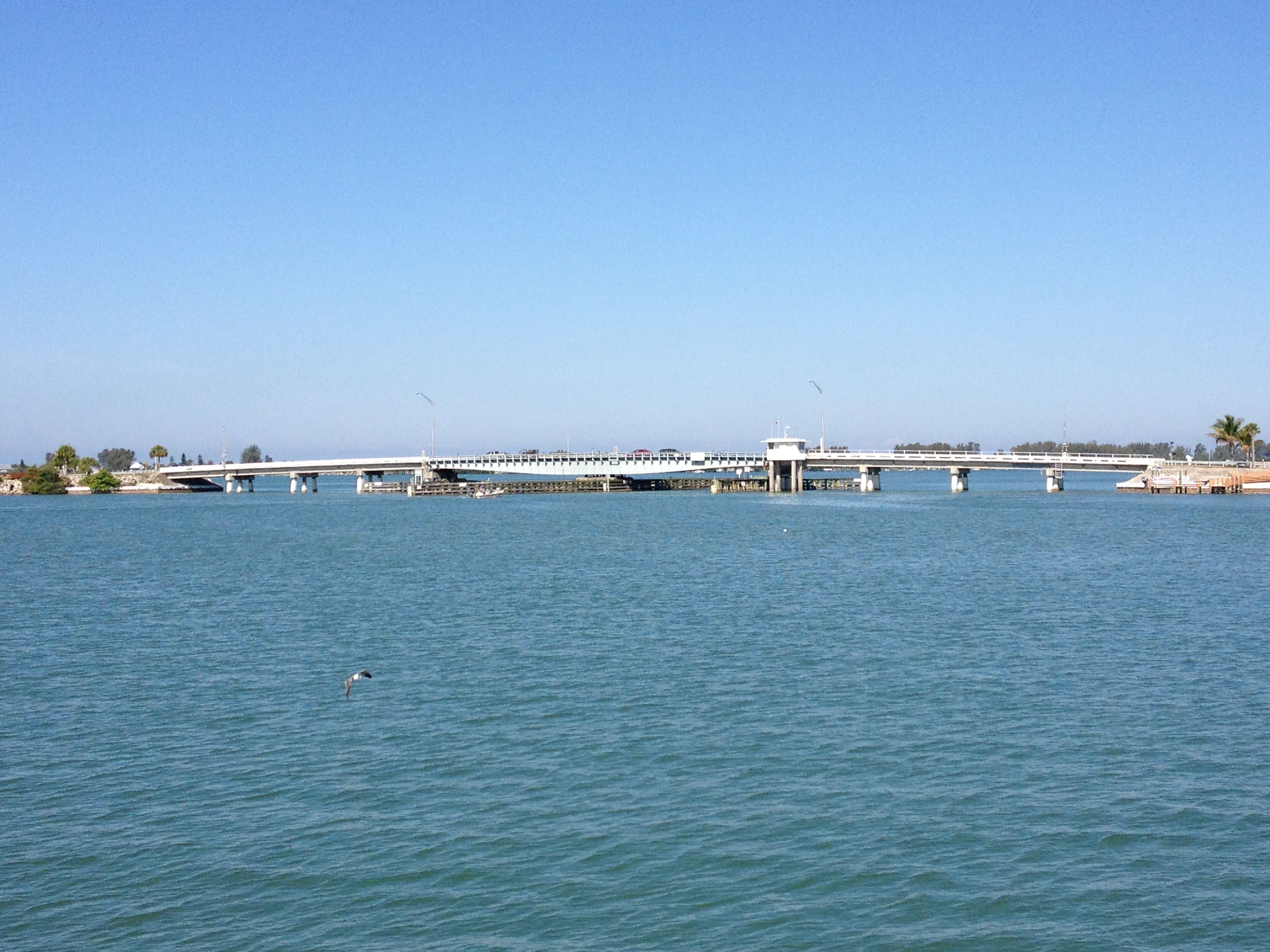
The original swing bridge which operated from 1958 to 2015

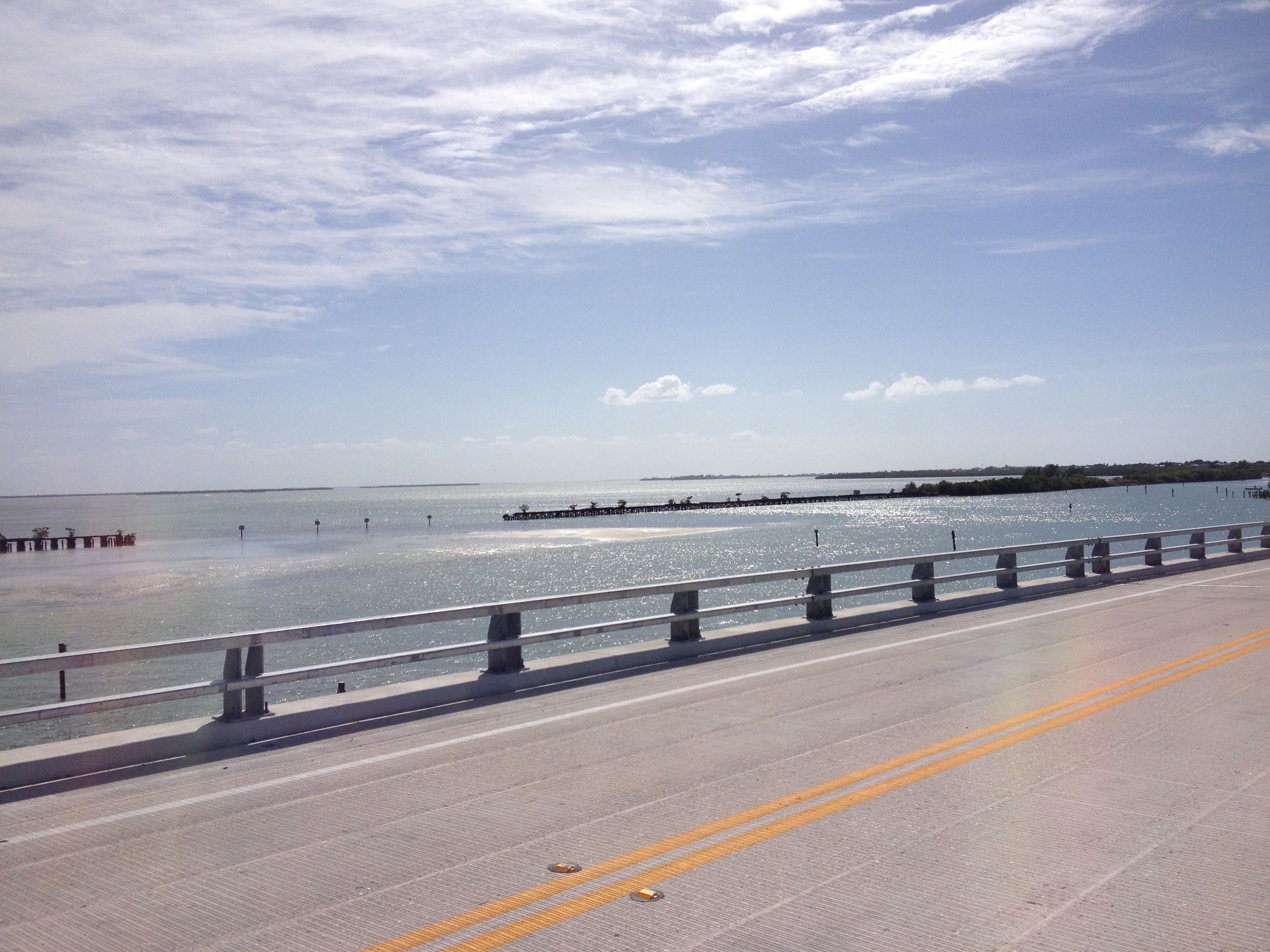
Gasparilla Sound and the defunct railroad trestle as seen from the center bridge

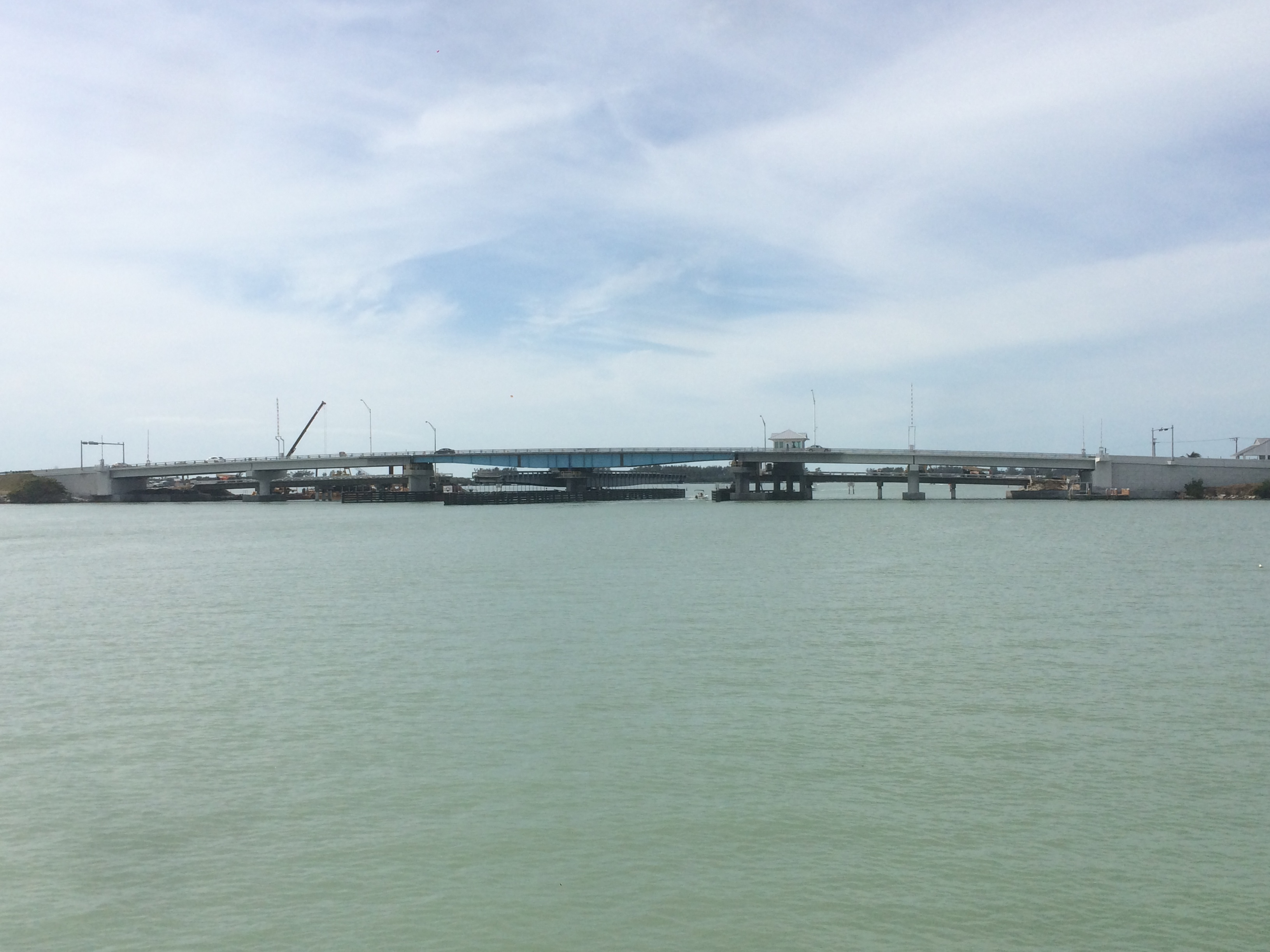
The current swing bridge with the original behind it prior to demolition

== See also ==
- List of bridges documented by the Historic American Engineering Record in Florida
- Tom Adams Bridge
