= Mathers Bridge =

Bridge in Florida, United States of America

- Coordinates: 28°08′57″N 80°36′22″W
- Carries: CR 3
- Crosses: Banana River
- Locale: Merritt Island and Indian Harbour Beach, Florida

History
- Construction end: 1927

Location
- Interactive map of Mathers Bridge

Mathers Bridge with the moveable section in the open position.

Mathers Bridge is a 700-foot-long (210 m) low-level swing bridge located on the southern tip of Merritt Island, Florida, crossing the Banana River at the end of County Road 3. The bridge connects local streets S. Tropical Trl. and Banana River Dr.

== History ==
The bridge was built in 1927 by John Mathers in order to connect Merritt Island to what is now Indian Harbour Beach, and was moved to its present location in 1952. It was constructed by the Austin Brothers Bridge Company. The bridge and the control house were rehabilitated in 2007. During the summer of 2022, the bridge was closed for repair due to corrosion. As of March 2023, the bridge is fully functional, allowing many boats to pass via its swinging mechanism each day.

== See also ==
- List of bridges documented by the Historic American Engineering Record in Florida
