= Palm Valley Bridge =

Bridge in Florida, United States of America

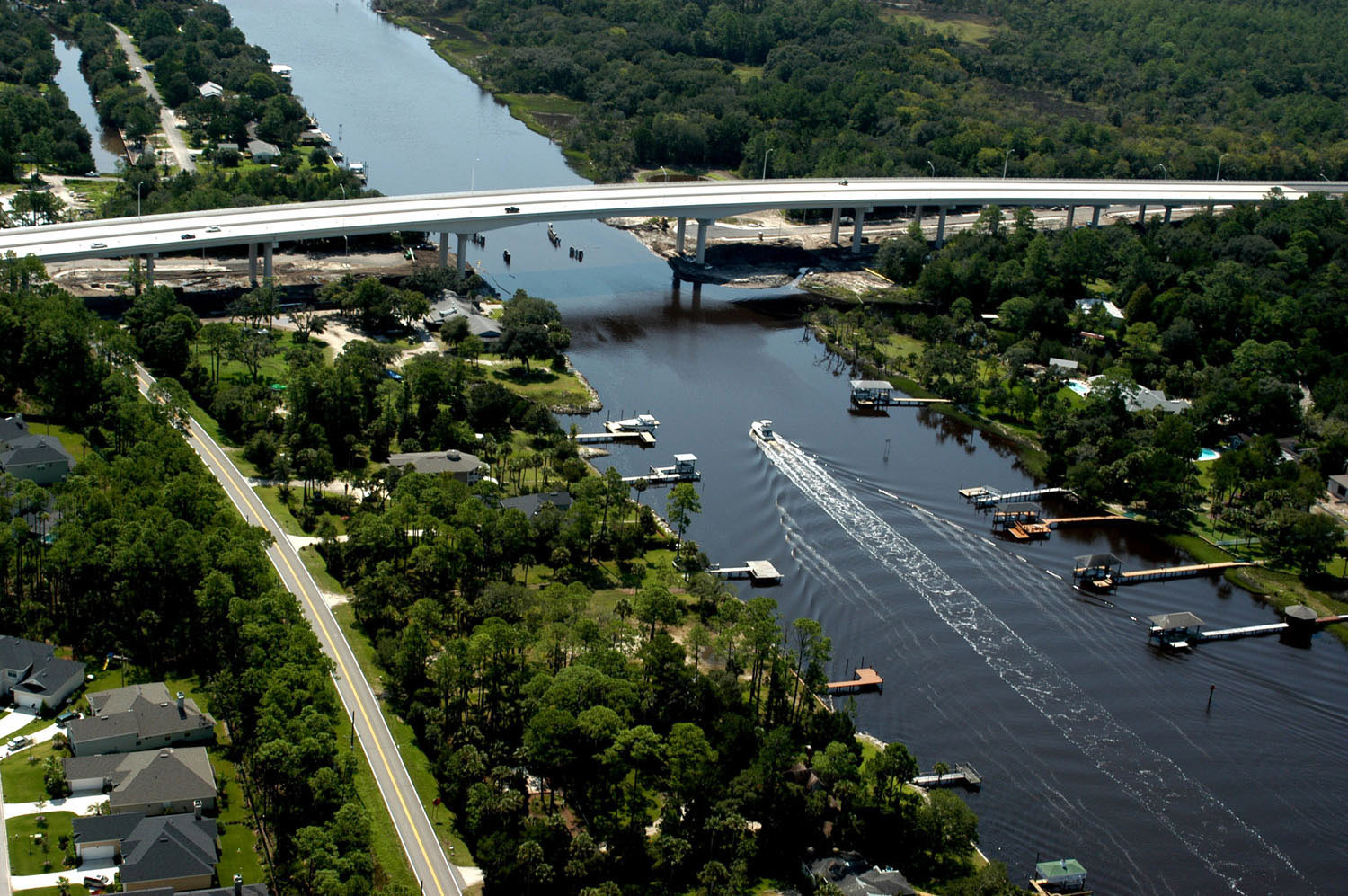
- The new Palm Valley Bridge that replaced the old drawbridge in 2002
- Coordinates: 30°07′58″N 81°23′07″W
- Carries: County Road 210
- Crosses: Intracoastal Waterway
- Locale: Palm Valley

Characteristics
- No. of lanes: 4

History
- Rebuilt: 2002

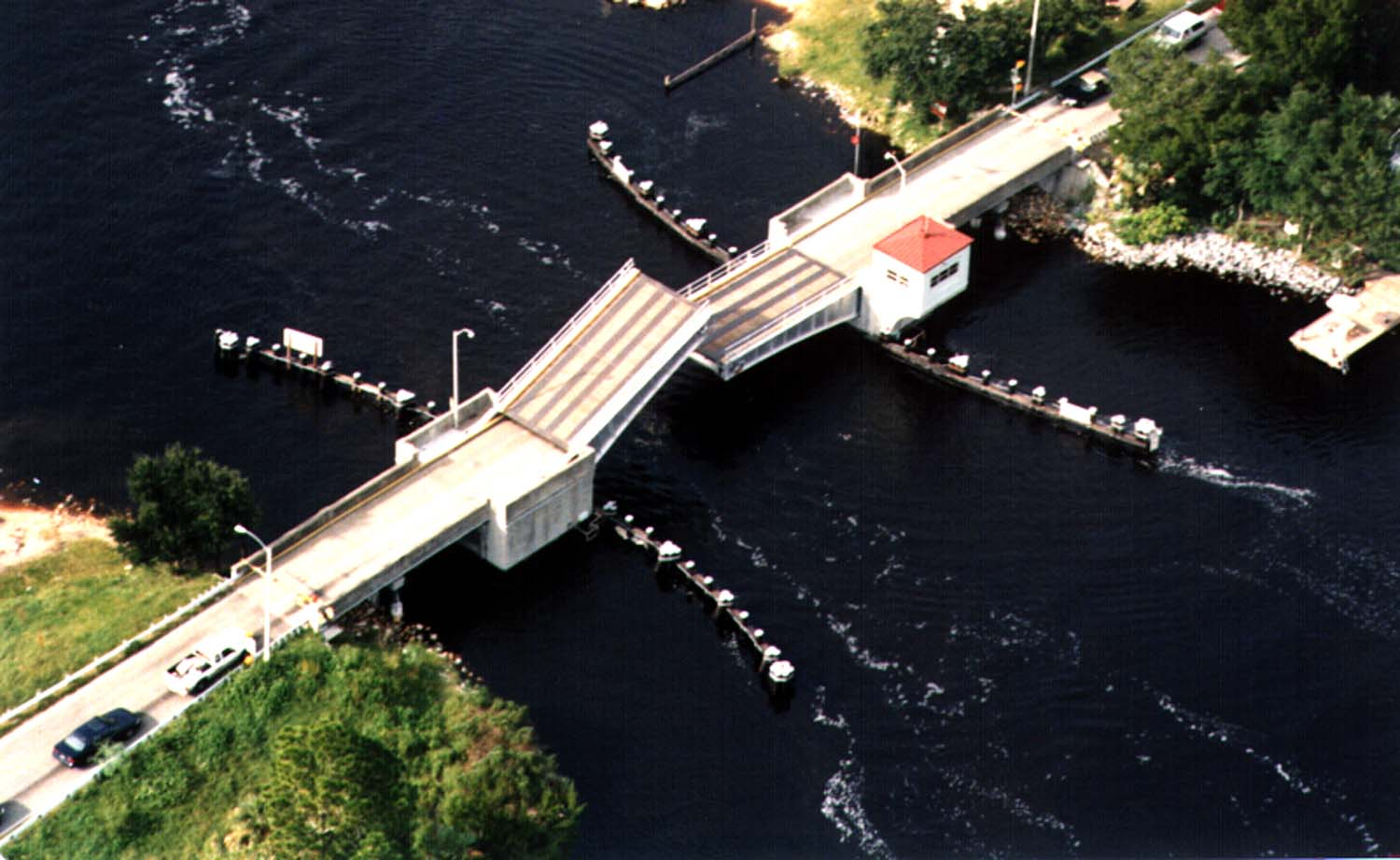
The old 1937 Palm Valley drawbridge, built by The Auchter Company that was demolished and replaced in 2002

The Palm Valley Bridge spans the Intracoastal Waterway in the Palm Valley area near Ponte Vedra Beach, Florida. It is located on County Road 210 in St. Johns County. In 2002, the old two-lane drawbridge was replaced with a fixed, clear span, four-lane bridge. Ground-breaking was in December 2000 and the official ribbon cutting ceremony was held in July 2002. The Palm Valley Bridge was built due to increasing traffic on the bridge and population growth in the area.

== See also ==
- List of bridges documented by the Historic American Engineering Record in Florida
