= Florida State Road 762 =

State highway in Florida, United States

State Road 762 and County Road 762

Route information
- Maintained by FDOT and Charlotte County DOT
- Length: 1.52 mi (2.45 km) 0.73 miles (1.175 km) as SR 762; 0.79 miles (1.27 km) as CR 762

Major junctions
- West end: US 41
- I-75
- East end: Tucker's Grade

Location
- Country: United States
- State: Florida
- County: Charlotte

Highway system
- Florida State Highway System; Interstate; US; State; Former; Pre‑1945; Toll; Scenic
← SR 758	→ SR 768

State Road 762 and County Road 762 are the designations for Tucker's Grade near Tropical Gulf Acres in southern Charlotte County, Florida, United States.

== Route description ==
Tucker's Grade begins near Tropical Gulf Acres at an intersection with US 41 (Tamiami Trail) and Green Gulf Boulevard. From US 41, it immediately crosses the Seminole Gulf Railway and heads east. A mile later, Tucker's Grade comes to an interchange with Interstate 75. CR 762 comes to an end half a mile east of Interstate 75 at the entrance to the Fred C. Babcock/Cecil M. Webb Wildlife Management Area. It continues as a dirt trail through the Wildlife Management Area as far as SR 31 near Babcock Ranch (though there is no vehicular access to SR 31).

== History ==
Tucker's Grade was originally a cattle trail that became a dirt road in the early 1900s. It is named for Allen B. Tucker, an early resident that lived along the grade and sought to have it improved along with other roads in the area. Tucker was an engineer and would serve as Punta Gorda sanitation inspector in the 1920s. On the west end, it turned and paralleled the railroad north along present-day Royal Road to Taylor Road in its early days. It would later cross the tracks to connect directly to the Tamiami Trail (US 41).

The Fred C. Babcock/Cecil M. Webb Wildlife Management Area was created in 1941 with Tucker's Grade passing through it.

Interstate 75 was completed through Charlotte County in 1981, and Tucker's Grade would be the freeway's southernmost exit in Charlotte County. Interstate 75 and US 41 are only a mile apart at Tucker's Grade, which is the closest the two highways come to each other south of Tampa. Tucker's Grade was designated SR 762 between the two highways before becoming CR 762 when it was relinquished to county control.

In 2025, a segment of CR 762 from its eastern terminus to just west of the interchange with I-75 was returned to state control.

== Major intersections ==
Location	mi	km	Destinations	Notes
Tropical Gulf Acres	0.0	0.0	US 41 (SR 45) – Fort Myers, Punta Gorda	continues west as Green Gulf Boulevard
	0.8	1.3	Western end of state maintenance	
	1.0	1.6	I-75 (SR 93) – Naples, Tampa	Exit 158 on I-75 road continues into the Fred C. Babcock/Cecil M. Webb Wildlife Management Area
	1.5	2.4	Tucker's Grade	road continues east without designation
1.000 mi = 1.609 km; 1.000 km = 0.621 mi
