= Grove City, Florida =

- Census-designated place
- Location in Charlotte County and the state of Florida
- Coordinates: 26°54′25″N 82°19′33″W
- Country: United States
- State: Florida
- County: Charlotte

Area
  - Total: 2.24 sq mi (5.80 km^{2})
  - Land: 1.36 sq mi (3.51 km^{2})
  - Water: 0.88 sq mi (2.29 km^{2})
- Elevation: 7 ft (2.1 m)

Population (2020)
  - Total: 2,174
  - Density: 1,604.3/sq mi (619.41/km^{2})
- Time zone: UTC-5 (Eastern (EST))
  - Summer (DST): UTC-4 (EDT)
- ZIP code: 34224
- Area code: 941
- FIPS code: 12-27775
- GNIS feature ID: 2402553

Grove City is an unincorporated community and census-designated place (CDP) in Charlotte County, Florida, United States. The population was 2,174 at the 2020 census, up from 1,804 at the 2010 census. It is part of the Punta Gorda, FL Metropolitan Statistical Area, included in the North Port-Bradenton, Florida Combined Statistical Area.

== History ==
Grove City was platted in 1886. A post office was established at Grove City in 1887, and remained in operation until 1910.

== Geography ==
Grove City is located in western Charlotte County. It is bordered by Englewood to the north and by Manasota Key to the west across Lemon Bay, an arm of the Gulf of Mexico. Rotonda West is to the southeast.

According to the United States Census Bureau, the Grove City CDP has a total area of 2.2 square miles (5.8 km^{2}), of which 1.4 square miles (3.5 km^{2}) is land and 0.89 square miles (2.3 km^{2}), or 39.54%, is water.

== Demographics ==
Historical population
Census	Pop.	Note	%±
1990	2,374		—
2000	2,092		−11.9%
2010	1,804		−13.8%
2020	2,174		20.5%
U.S. Decennial Census

=== 2020 census ===
As of the 2020 census, Grove City had a population of 2,174. The median age was 65.7 years. 8.9% of residents were under the age of 18 and 51.0% of residents were 65 years of age or older. For every 100 females there were 96.7 males, and for every 100 females age 18 and over there were 92.3 males age 18 and over.

100.0% of residents lived in urban areas, while 0.0% lived in rural areas.

There were 1,096 households in Grove City, of which 8.8% had children under the age of 18 living in them. Of all households, 44.2% were married-couple households, 22.3% were households with a male householder and no spouse or partner present, and 26.6% were households with a female householder and no spouse or partner present. About 39.7% of all households were made up of individuals and 25.7% had someone living alone who was 65 years of age or older.

There were 1,625 housing units, of which 32.6% were vacant. The homeowner vacancy rate was 2.0% and the rental vacancy rate was 19.1%.

Racial composition as of the 2020 census
Race	Number	Percent
White	2,008	92.4%
Black or African American	3	0.1%
American Indian and Alaska Native	10	0.5%
Asian	7	0.3%
Native Hawaiian and Other Pacific Islander	2	0.1%
Some other race	25	1.1%
Two or more races	119	5.5%
Hispanic or Latino (of any race)	99	4.6%

=== 2000 census ===
As of the census of 2000, there were 2,092 people, 1,045 households, and 659 families residing in the CDP. The population density was 1,647.6 inhabitants per square mile (636.1/km^{2}). There were 1,457 housing units at an average density of 1,147.5 per square mile (443.1/km^{2}). The racial makeup of the CDP was 97.71% White, 0.43% African American, 0.38% Native American, 0.67% Asian, 0.29% from other races, and 0.53% from two or more races. Hispanic or Latino of any race were 0.91% of the population.

There were 1,045 households, out of which 13.5% had children under the age of 18 living with them, 53.3% were married couples living together, 5.6% had a female householder with no husband present, and 36.9% were non-families. 30.0% of all households were made up of individuals, and 18.7% had someone living alone who was 65 years of age or older. The average household size was 2.00 and the average family size was 2.40.

In the CDP, the population was spread out, with 12.7% under the age of 18, 3.7% from 18 to 24, 17.3% from 25 to 44, 28.3% from 45 to 64, and 38.1% who were 65 years of age or older. The median age was 58 years. For every 100 females, there were 99.8 males. For every 100 females age 18 and over, there were 96.9 males.

The median income for a household in the CDP was $32,104, and the median income for a family was $41,976. Males had a median income of $22,685 versus $17,177 for females. The per capita income for the CDP was $21,602. About 4.9% of families and 9.6% of the population were below the poverty line, including 13.6% of those under age 18 and 6.9% of those age 65 or over.
