= Florida State Road 768 =

State highway in Florida, United States

State Road 768 and County Road 768

Route information
- Maintained by FDOT and Charlotte County DOT
- Length: 7.8 mi (12.6 km) 1.01 miles (1.625 km) as SR 768; 6.79 miles (10.93 km) as CR 768

Major junctions
- West end: CR 765 in Charlotte County
- US 41 in Charlotte County; I-75 in Charlotte County
- East end: CR 765 in Charlotte County

Location
- Country: United States
- State: Florida
- County: Charlotte

Highway system
- Florida State Highway System; Interstate; US; State; Former; Pre‑1945; Toll; Scenic
← SR 762	→ SR 776

State Road 768 (SR 768) and County Road 768 (CR 768) is a loop road consisting of Acline Road and Jones Loop Road in southern Charlotte County, Florida, United States.

== Route description ==
CR 768 begins at Burnt Store Road (CR 765) just south of Alligator Creek. It heads east along Acline Road and quickly intersects US Highway 41 (US 41, Tamiami Trail). It then crosses the Seminole Gulf Railway immediately east of US 41. At Taylor Road (CR 765A), CR 768 becomes South Jones Loop Road and continues easterly, crossing over Interstate 75 (I-75). About 1.5 miles (2.4 km) east of the Interstate overpass, it turns north for less than a mile before turning back west. From here, the road is known is North Jones Loop Road and it passes just south of Punta Gorda Airport. It expands to four lanes, transitioning to SR 768, and comes to I-75 again, this time with an interchange. A number of services for the highway, including gas, restaurants, and lodging exists on the northwest corner of the interchange. Jones Loop Road then intersects Taylor Road (CR 765A) just after transitioning back to county maintenance, and continues west. CR 768 comes to an end at Burnt Store Road (CR 765) just northeast of US 41. Though, Jones Loop Road continues west from here along CR 765 across the Seminole Gulf Railway to an intersection with US 41.

== History ==
Acline Road was named for a former railroad station named Acline which was located near the railroad crossing. Acline was an acronym for the Atlantic Coast Line Railroad, the company that built the railroad from Punta Gorda south (which is now the Seminole Gulf Railway).

Jones Loop was heavily rebuilt east of Taylor Road in 1967, and it was designated as SR 768 until the 1980s when it was relinquished to county control.

I-75 was completed through Charlotte County in 1981, and Jones Loop Road received an interchange at its northern intersection with the freeway. A rest area for the freeway was also built on the southeast corner of the interchange, which would lead to a number of travel related businesses, such as gas stations, restaurants, and motels, to open at the interchange.

North Jones Loop Road was extended from Taylor Road to Burnt Store Road (CR 765) and US 41 in the mid-1990s.

The rest area for I-75 at Jones Loop Road closed in 2015 due to low usage. While the rest area's buildings were demolished, the rest of its infrastructure remains abandoned.

In 2025, the portion of CR 768 from slightly east of CR 765A to east of Piper Road was re-adopted as a state highway.

== Major intersections ==
The entire route is in Charlotte County.

Location	mi	km	Destinations	Notes
	0.0	0.0	CR 765 (Burnt Store Road)	
	0.4	0.64	US 41 – Punta Gorda, Port Charlotte	
	1.0	1.6	CR 765A (Taylor Road)	
	5.9	9.5	Eastern end of state maintenance	
	6.1	9.8	Piper Road	To Punta Gorda Airport
	6.5	10.5	I-75 – Naples, Tampa	Exit 161 on I-75
	6.9	11.1	Western end of state maintenance	
	7.0	11.3	CR 765A (Taylor Road)	
	7.8	12.6	CR 765 (Burnt Store Road / Jones Loop Road) to US 41	Roadway continues westward as CR 765
1.000 mi = 1.609 km; 1.000 km = 0.621 mi
