= Florida State Road 777 =

Highway in Florida

State Road 777
- River Road
- SR 777 highlighted in red

Route information
- Maintained by FDOT
- Length: 5.819 mi (9.365 km)
- Existed: 2020–present

Major junctions
- South end: US 41 in North Port
- North end: I-75 near North Port

Location
- Country: United States
- State: Florida

Highway system
- Florida State Highway System; Interstate; US; State; Former; Pre‑1945; Toll; Scenic
← SR 776	→ SR 780

State Road 777 (SR 777) is a 5.8-mile-long (9.3 km) state road near North Port, Florida, United States. SR 777 is locally known as River Road from Interstate 75 (I-75) south to its southern terminus at Tamiami Trail (US Highway 41, US 41), where it continues south as a county road.

== Route description ==
SR 777 begins at an intersection with US 41. Upon crossing US 41, the road is a six-lane divided highway. The road passes through some residential developments and West Villages Parkway. The state road heads northwest through some developments, crossing Center Road, Jelks Preserve, and crossing Venice Avenue. SR 777 reaches its northern terminus at the interchange with I-75. The road's end of pavement is just north of the interchange, south of Curry Creek.

== History ==
The road has been shown on Florida's official transportation maps (formerly known as road maps) as far back as 1917. On the 1917 State Road Department (SRD) Map, the state road spanned Englewood to present-day North Port. The road was a portion of "Road Number 12" as designated by the State Road Department, a precursor to Florida Department of Transportation (FDOT). The road was then known as SR 311, spanning from Venice to Englewood, as a loop of US 41 before it was renumbered in 1945. After the 1945 renumbering, the state road spanned from Englewood to North Port, from SR 775 to US 41, with its alignment north of US 41 parallel to the Myakka River. The portion north of US 41 was transferred to the county sometime in the 1950s. The southern portion from US 41 to SR 775 was transferred to the county sometime between 1978 and 1979.

In 2018, Sarasota County accepted the state's $40 million offer to swap responsibility for several roads (i.e., road swap) in exchange for the state to perform major improvements on River Road, one of the county’s main thoroughfares and vital evacuation routes. FDOT handed over the responsibility of a portion of SR 758, known locally as Siesta Drive and Midnight Pass Road, west of US 41. The county will be responsible for ongoing maintenance of those roadways, although the state would still maintain the bridges to Siesta Key. The road transfer was completed in September 2020.

In August 2021, FDOT awarded a contract with Stantec and de Moya Group to widen River Road from US 41 to Interstate 75. The road was widened to a six-lane divided highway from US 41 to north of Center Road, and to a four-lane divided highway from north of Center Road to the interstate interchange, with the right-of-way for a six-lane divided highway. Construction began in February 2022, with the road widening projected to be finished by mid-2025. The construction project was changed in 2024 to widen the River Road segment of Center Road to the interstate interchange from two lanes to six lanes, making the project from I-75 to US 41 constructed as six lanes. Construction was completed in October 2026.

== Major intersections ==
The entire highway is in Sarasota County.

Location	mi	km	Destinations	Notes
North Port	0.000	0.000	US 41 (Tamiami Trail) – CoolToday Park	Southern terminus
North Port	1.668	2.684	West Villages Parkway	North Port city limits are located in the middle of right of way
	3.219	5.180	Center Road	
	4.800	7.725	Venice Avenue	
	5.601	9.014	I-75 – Tampa, Naples	I-75 exit 191, northern terminus
	5.819	9.365	End of pavement	
1.000 mi = 1.609 km; 1.000 km = 0.621 mi
