= Wildflower Preserve (Florida) =

Nature preserve on Cape Haze, Florida, US

Wildflower Preserve is an 80-acre (32 ha) preserve located on the Cape Haze peninsula in Charlotte County, Florida. It was formerly used as a golf course. The property includes upland habitats and fresh water ponds that feed into Lemon Creek and on to Lemon Bay.
