= Leo Wotitzky =

American politician

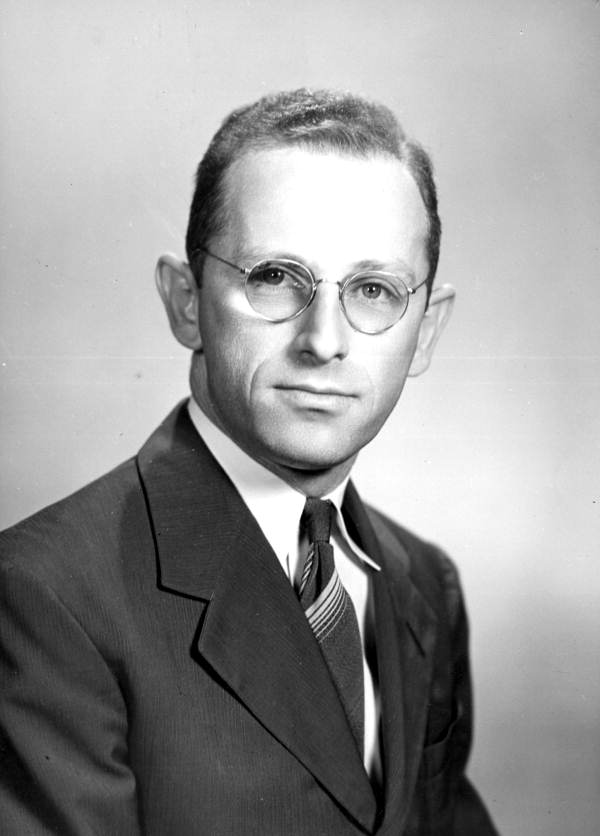
- Wotitzky in 1939

Member of the Florida House of Representatives from Charlotte County
- In office 1939–1949

Personal details
- Born: May 19, 1912 Punta Gorda, Florida, U.S.
- Died: November 13, 2005 (aged 93)
- Party: Democratic
- Education: University of Florida

Leo Wotitzky (May 19, 1912 – November 13, 2005) was an American politician. He served as a Democratic member of the Florida House of Representatives.

== Life and career ==
Wotitzky was born in Punta Gorda, Florida. He attended the University of Florida.

Wotitzky served in the Florida House of Representatives from 1939 to 1949.

Wotitzky died on November 13, 2005, at the age of 93.
