= Port Charlotte Town Center =

Mall in Port Charlotte, Florida, US

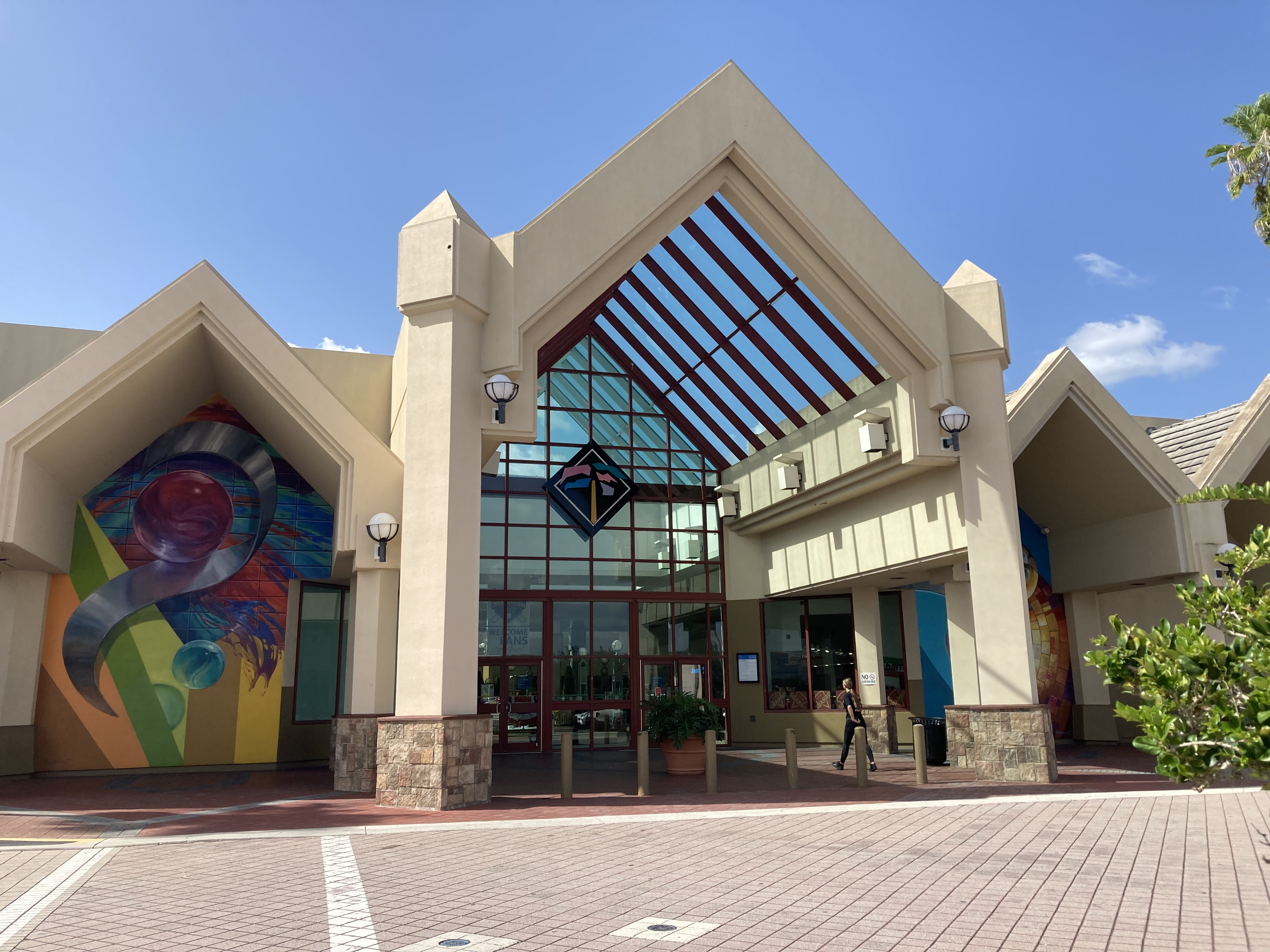
- Location: Port Charlotte, Florida, United States
- Coordinates: 27°00′32″N 82°08′51″W
- Address: 1441 Tamiami Trail
- Opened: 1989
- Developer: Edward J Debartolo Corp.
- Num. of stores: 100+
- Num. of anchor tenants: 6 (4 open, 2 vacant)
- Floor area: 1,000,000 square feet (93,000 m^{2})
- Floors: 1
- Website: portcharlottetowncenter.com

The Port Charlotte Town Center is a mall in Port Charlotte, Florida. The mall serves Port Charlotte and the neighboring communities of North Port, Englewood, and Punta Gorda. The anchor stores are Regal Cinemas, Bealls, Dillard's, and JCPenney. There are 2 vacant anchor stores that were once Sears and Macy's. All anchors have one floor.

== History ==
The mall began in 1987, with the purchase of 132 acres of land from the General Development Corporation by developer Edward J. DeBartolo Corporation. Phase 1 was announced to include 600,000 sq ft of mall space with 3 department store anchors, one announced to be J. C. Penney, and 195,000 sq ft of outparcels. Phase 2 would include 2 more department store anchors and an additional 435,000 sq ft in "peripheral businesses". In September 1987, Maas Brothers and Belk-Lindsey were announced as 2 additional anchors, along with an unnamed fourth anchor. Groundbreaking ceremonies were held on December 8, with plans dropping "Phase 2" and instead planning to open the 1,000,000 sq ft, 6-anchor mall in one phase, projected to be finished by Fall 1989. At this time, Sears had been confirmed as the fourth anchor. Mall anchors J. C. Penney, Sears, and Belk-Lindsey opened before the mall on July 29, 1989. The J. C. Penney opening was attended by Miss Universe Angela Visser. A "Gala Preview" of the mall was held August 1, 1989 in a party headlined by Jack Jones. The mall opened, on schedule, on August 2, 1989 to a crowd of over 25,000.

The Maas Brothers store, which was planned to open in 1990, was put on hold in early January 1990, before parent company Allied Stores filed for Chapter 11 Bankruptcy. Dillard's and Montgomery Ward were announced as additional anchors in September 1991, by which the Maas Brothers anchor was considered "abandoned". The Belk-Lindsey store at the mall was sold to Burdines in February 1994, and renovated that summer. Regal Cinemas was built at the mall in 1999.

Montgomery Ward closed at the mall in 2001 following their bankruptcy; Bealls opened in the space the following year. Burdines became Burdines-Macy's in 2003, before converting to Macy's in 2005. On December 28, 2018, it was announced that Sears would be closing as part of a plan to close 80 stores nationwide. The store closed in March 2019.

On January 6, 2021, it was announced that Macy's would be closing in March 2021 as part of a plan to close 46 stores nationwide.

The mall was owned by Washington Prime Group but was auctioned due to the Washington Prime's bankruptcy, and Washington Prime's creditors were the winning bidder. As of July 2022, the mall continues operations as normal following the bankruptcy auction. On September 28, 2022, The Bealls was damaged by Hurricane Ian along with DSW and Dillard’s.
