= Stump Pass Beach State Park =

State park in Florida

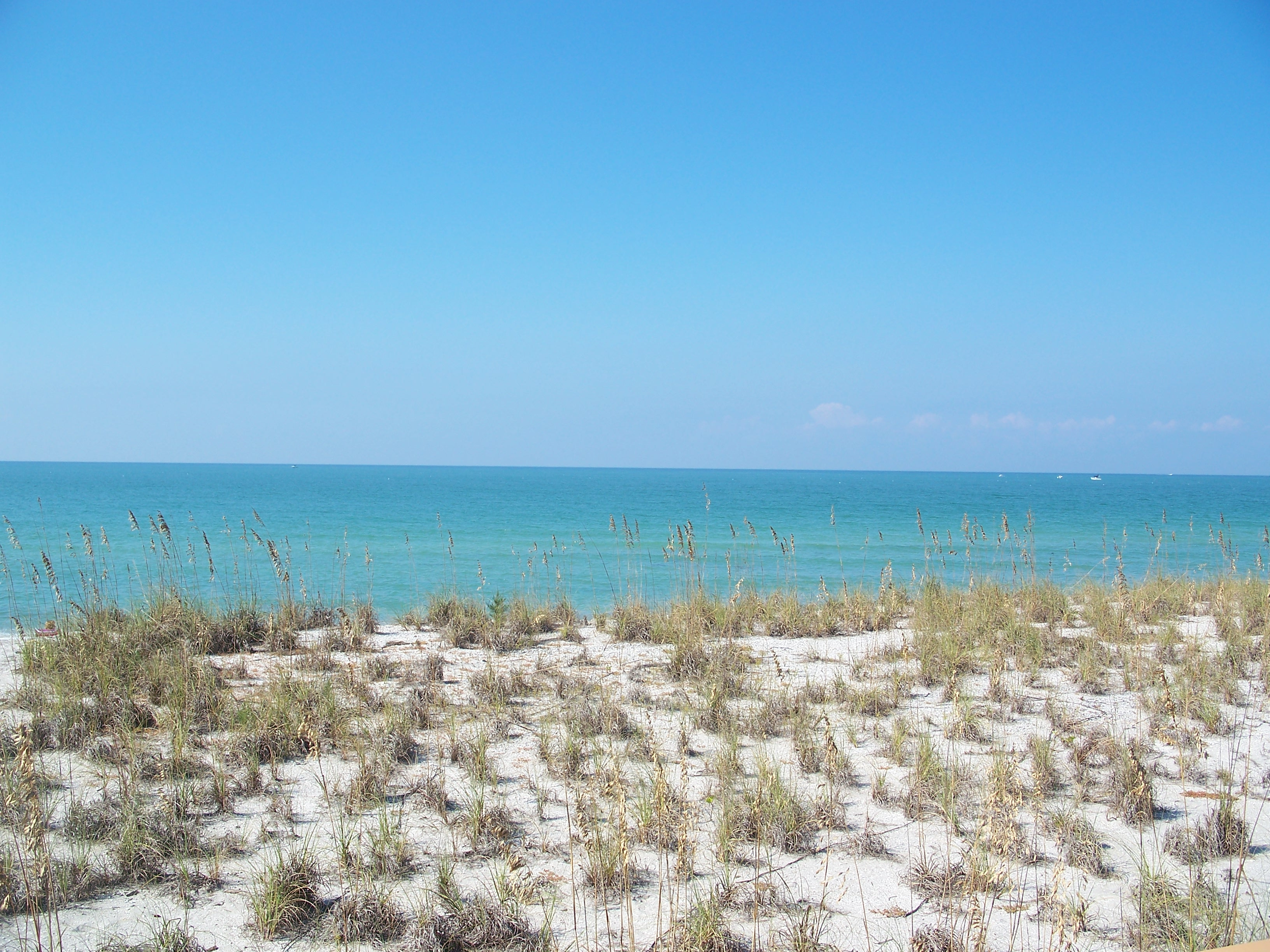
- A view of the beach on a sunny day

- Location within Florida Location within the United States
- Interactive map of Stump Pass Beach State Park
- Location: Charlotte County, Florida, United States
- Nearest city: Englewood, Florida
- Coordinates: 26°53′51″N 82°20′34″W
- Area: 245 acres (0.99 km^{2})
- Governing body: Florida Department of Environmental Protection

Stump Pass Beach State Park is a Florida State Park. The park includes the southern peninsula of Manasota Key, and two small islands to the east, Whidden and Peterson Key. The park is located in Englewood, Florida.

== Admission and Hours ==
There is a park use fee. $3.00 per vehicle (containing up to 8 people). Bikes, boats, kayaks, and walkers have a separate fee of $2. Florida state parks are open between 8 a.m. and sundown every day of the year (including holidays). Dogs are not allowed on the beach.

== History ==
Prior to 1971, Stump Pass Beach State Park was known as Port Charlotte Beach State Recreation Area. On May 10, 1970 the park was transferred to the state of Florida from Charlotte county. The park opened to the public in 1971 with no services. Picnic pavilions, a boardwalk, outdoor showers, and restrooms were added to the park in 2000.

== Ecology ==
Red mangroves, black mangroves and buttonwood grow along the park’s eastern shore and nature trail. Mangrove roots stabilize shoreline sediments and provide shelter for juvenile marine animals.

== Activities ==
A 1.3-mile hiking trail is available. Beach activities include fishing, shark tooth collection, swimming, sunbathing, paddling, and snorkeling. Ranger-led turtle walks and nature hikes are available in the winter.
