= Cleveland, Florida =

- Census-designated place
- Location in Charlotte County and the state of Florida
- Coordinates: 26°56′47″N 82°00′06″W
- Country: United States
- State: Florida
- County: Charlotte

Area
  - Total: 5.72 sq mi (14.81 km^{2})
  - Land: 5.25 sq mi (13.61 km^{2})
  - Water: 0.47 sq mi (1.21 km^{2})
- Elevation: 13 ft (4.0 m)

Population (2020)
  - Total: 3,435
  - Density: 653.8/sq mi (252.45/km^{2})
- Time zone: UTC-5 (Eastern (EST))
  - Summer (DST): UTC-4 (EDT)
- FIPS code: 12-12950
- GNIS feature ID: 2402783

Cleveland is a census-designated place (CDP) in Charlotte County, Florida, United States. The population was 3,435 at the 2020 census, up from 2,990 at the 2010 census. It is part of the Punta Gorda, FL Metropolitan Statistical Area, part of the North Port-Bradenton, Florida Combined Statistical Area.

== Geography ==
Cleveland is located in north-central Charlotte County. It is bordered on the north by the Peace River and on the west by the community of Solana. Punta Gorda, the Charlotte County seat, is 4 miles (6 km) to the southwest via U.S. Route 17. Interstate 75 separates Cleveland from Solana and serves both communities from Exit 164.

According to the United States Census Bureau, the Cleveland CDP has a total area of 5.7 square miles (14.8 km^{2}), of which 5.2 square miles (13.5 km^{2}) is land and 0.50 square miles (1.3 km^{2}), or 9.03%, is water.

== Demographics ==
Historical population
| Census | Pop. | Note | %± |
|---|---|---|---|
| 1990 | 2,896 | | — |
| 2000 | 3,268 | | 12.8% |
| 2010 | 2,990 | | −8.5% |
| 2020 | 3,435 | | 14.9% |
U.S. Decennial Census

=== 2020 census ===
As of the 2020 census, Cleveland had a population of 3,435. The median age was 58.8 years. 13.8% of residents were under the age of 18 and 39.5% of residents were 65 years of age or older. For every 100 females, there were 96.7 males, and for every 100 females age 18 and over there were 96.7 males age 18 and over.

88.7% of residents lived in urban areas, while 11.3% lived in rural areas.

There were 1,626 households in Cleveland, of which 14.4% had children under the age of 18 living in them. Of all households, 47.4% were married-couple households, 20.4% were households with a male householder and no spouse or partner present, and 25.0% were households with a female householder and no spouse or partner present. About 31.0% of all households were made up of individuals, and 19.7% had someone living alone who was 65 years of age or older.

There were 2,084 housing units, of which 22.0% were vacant. The homeowner vacancy rate was 1.8% and the rental vacancy rate was 9.4%.

Racial composition as of the 2020 census
| Race | Number | Percent |
|---|---|---|
| White | 3,095 | 90.1% |
| Black or African American | 58 | 1.7% |
| American Indian and Alaska Native | 16 | 0.5% |
| Asian | 31 | 0.9% |
| Native Hawaiian and Other Pacific Islander | 0 | 0.0% |
| Some other race | 59 | 1.7% |
| Two or more races | 176 | 5.1% |
| Hispanic or Latino (of any race) | 199 | 5.8% |

=== 2000 census ===
As of the census of 2000, there were 3,268 people, 1,571 households, and 1,007 families residing in the CDP. The population density was 594.7 inhabitants per square mile (229.6/km^{2}). There were 1,978 housing units at an average density of 359.9 per square mile (139.0/km^{2}). The racial makeup of the CDP was 97.83% White, 0.40% African American, 0.34% Native American, 0.21% Asian, 0.03% Pacific Islander, 0.49% from other races, and 0.70% from two or more races. Hispanic or Latino of any race were 1.44% of the population.

There were 1,571 households, out of which 14.8% had children under the age of 18 living with them, 54.6% were married couples living together, 6.3% had a female householder with no husband present, and 35.9% were non-families. 29.9% of all households were made up of individuals, and 17.3% had someone living alone who was 65 years of age or older. The average household size was 2.08 and the average family size was 2.52.

In the CDP, the population was spread out, with 14.3% under the age of 18, 5.5% from 18 to 24, 17.7% from 25 to 44, 26.8% from 45 to 64, and 35.6% who were 65 years of age or older. The median age was 54 years. For every 100 females, there were 100.0 males. For every 100 females age 18 and over, there were 96.8 males.

The median income for a household in the CDP was $31,537, and the median income for a family was $37,208. Males had a median income of $30,778 versus $20,667 for females. The per capita income for the CDP was $21,468. About 5.9% of families and 8.4% of the population were below the poverty line, including 3.9% of those under age 18 and 6.3% of those age 65 or over.
