= Harbour Heights, Florida =

- Census-designated place
- Location in Charlotte County and the state of Florida
- Coordinates: 26°59′50″N 82°00′18″W
- Country: United States
- State: Florida
- County: Charlotte

Area
  - Total: 2.44 sq mi (6.32 km^{2})
  - Land: 2.17 sq mi (5.62 km^{2})
  - Water: 0.27 sq mi (0.70 km^{2})
- Elevation: 10 ft (3.0 m)

Population (2020)
  - Total: 3,428
  - Density: 1,580.7/sq mi (610.33/km^{2})
- Time zone: UTC-5 (Eastern (EST))
  - Summer (DST): UTC-4 (EDT)
- FIPS code: 12-28800
- GNIS feature ID: 2402565

Harbour Heights is a census-designated place (CDP) in Charlotte County, Florida, United States. The population was 3,428 at the 2020 census, up from 2,987 at the 2010 census. It is part of the Punta Gorda, Florida Metropolitan Statistical Area, included in the North Port-Bradenton, Florida Combined Statistical Area.

== Geography ==
Harbour Heights is located in northern Charlotte County on the northwest side of the Peace River. Harbor View Road connects the community to Interstate 75, 1 mile (1.6 km) to the southwest. Punta Gorda, the Charlotte County seat, is 6 miles (10 km) to the southwest on the south side of the Peace River.

According to the United States Census Bureau, the Harbour Heights CDP has a total area of 2.4 square miles (6.3 km^{2}), of which 2.2 square miles (5.6 km^{2}) is land and 0.27 square miles (0.7 km^{2}), or 11.19%, is water.

== Demographics ==
Historical population
Census	Pop.	Note	%±
1990	2,523		—
2000	2,873		13.9%
2010	2,987		4.0%
2020	3,428		14.8%
U.S. Decennial Census

=== 2020 census ===
As of the 2020 census, Harbour Heights had a population of 3,428. The median age was 56.7 years. 15.2% of residents were under the age of 18 and 35.4% of residents were 65 years of age or older. For every 100 females there were 94.2 males, and for every 100 females age 18 and over there were 93.4 males age 18 and over.

100.0% of residents lived in urban areas, while 0.0% lived in rural areas.

There were 1,510 households in Harbour Heights, of which 19.0% had children under the age of 18 living in them. Of all households, 56.3% were married-couple households, 15.7% were households with a male householder and no spouse or partner present, and 21.9% were households with a female householder and no spouse or partner present. About 26.3% of all households were made up of individuals and 16.8% had someone living alone who was 65 years of age or older.

There were 1,728 housing units, of which 12.6% were vacant. The homeowner vacancy rate was 0.6% and the rental vacancy rate was 8.5%.

Racial composition as of the 2020 census
Race	Number	Percent
White	2,908	84.8%
Black or African American	133	3.9%
American Indian and Alaska Native	13	0.4%
Asian	45	1.3%
Native Hawaiian and Other Pacific Islander	0	0.0%
Some other race	66	1.9%
Two or more races	263	7.7%
Hispanic or Latino (of any race)	288	8.4%

=== 2000 census ===
As of the 2000 census, there were 2,873 people, 1,243 households, and 919 families residing in the CDP. The population density was 1,308.2 inhabitants per square mile (505.1/km^{2}). There were 1,383 housing units at an average density of 629.8 per square mile (243.2/km^{2}). The racial makeup of the CDP was 93.70% White, 2.85% African American, 0.03% Native American, 0.77% Asian, 0.07% Pacific Islander, 0.73% from other races, and 1.84% from two or more races. Hispanic or Latino of any race were 3.83% of the population.

There were 1,243 households, out of which 21.0% had children under the age of 18 living with them, 62.8% were married couples living together, 8.2% had a female householder with no husband present, and 26.0% were non-families. 20.8% of all households were made up of individuals, and 12.8% had someone living alone who was 65 years of age or older. The average household size was 2.31 and the average family size was 2.64.

In the CDP, the population was spread out, with 18.2% under the age of 18, 4.7% from 18 to 24, 19.2% from 25 to 44, 27.0% from 45 to 64, and 30.9% who were 65 years of age or older. The median age was 51 years. For every 100 females, there were 87.7 males. For every 100 females age 18 and over, there were 86.0 males.

The median income for a household in the CDP was $44,394, and the median income for a family was $47,025. Males had a median income of $31,825 versus $21,173 for females. The per capita income for the CDP was $22,547. About 1.8% of families and 2.7% of the population were below the poverty line, including none of those under age 18 and 3.7% of those age 65 or over.
