= Manasota Key, Florida =

Manasota Key, Florida Englewood Beach
- Census-designated place
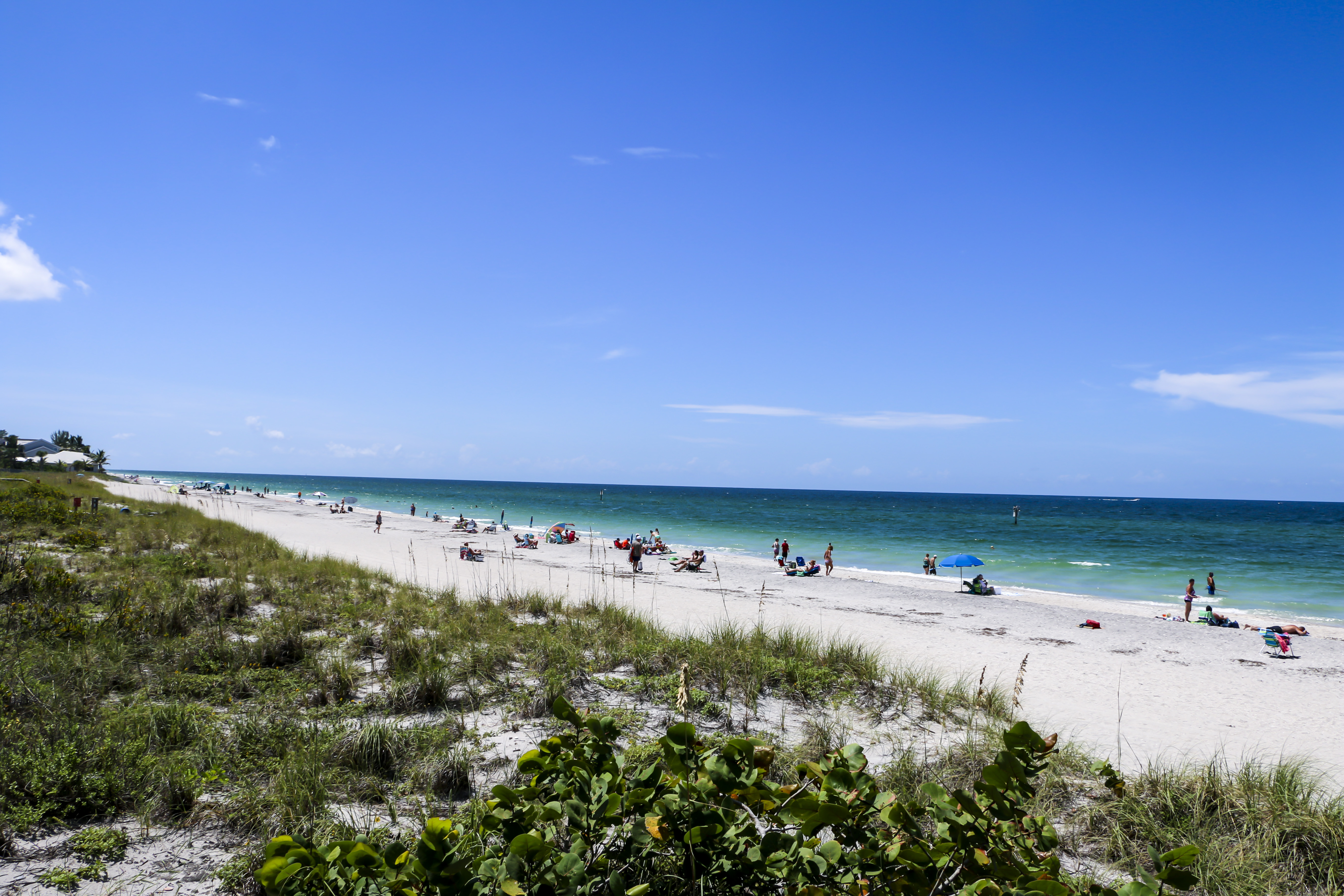
- Englewood Beach

- Location in Charlotte County and the state of Florida
- Coordinates: 26°56′25″N 82°21′50″W
- Country: United States
- State: Florida
- County: Charlotte

Area
  - Total: 3.07 sq mi (7.95 km^{2})
  - Land: 1.06 sq mi (2.74 km^{2})
  - Water: 2.01 sq mi (5.21 km^{2})
- Elevation: 0 ft (0 m)

Population (2020)
  - Total: 1,326
  - Density: 1,252.4/sq mi (483.57/km^{2})
- Time zone: UTC-5 (Eastern (EST))
  - Summer (DST): UTC-4 (EDT)
- ZIP code: 34223
- Area code: 941
- FIPS code: 12-42750
- GNIS feature ID: 2403252

Manasota Key is a census-designated place (CDP) consisting mainly of the community of Englewood Beach in Charlotte County, Florida, United States. The population of the CDP was 1,326 at the 2020 census, up from 1,229 at the 2010 census. It is part of the Punta Gorda, Florida Metropolitan Statistical Area, included in the North Port-Bradenton, Florida Combined Statistical Area.

== History ==
"Manasota Key" refers to an 11-mile-long (18 km) peninsula (transformed into a barrier island by the Gulf Intracoastal Waterway) that continues north into Sarasota County. The name originated from Manasota Lumber Company, a Maryland-based timber company with a sawmill in Woodmere from 1918 to 1923. Manasota is a portmanteau of manatee and Sarasota.

The community of Englewood Beach occupies the Charlotte County portion of the key, while the Sarasota County part of the peninsula contains the community of Manasota Beach. The key continues north as Caspersen Beach, extending as far as the Venice city limits.

== Geography ==
The Manasota Key CDP is located in the northwestern corner of Charlotte County. As noted above, the barrier island of the same name extends north well into Sarasota County. Its western edge is the Gulf of Mexico, and to the east is Lemon Bay, an estuary. The community of Englewood Beach occupies most of the CDP, and it is connected to the mainland by Beach Road, which crosses Lemon Bay to Englewood. The southern end of the CDP, which includes Manasota Key, Peterson Island, and Whidden Key, is covered by Stump Pass Beach State Park. Stump Pass is a channel that connects Lemon Bay to the Gulf of Mexico and separates Manasota Key from Don Pedro Island to the south. Grove City is located directly to the east across Lemon Bay from the south end of Manasota Key.

According to the United States Census Bureau, the CDP has a total area of 3.1 square miles (8.0 km^{2}), of which 1.0 square mile (2.7 km^{2}) is land and 2.0 square miles (5.2 km^{2}), or 65.97%, is water.

The extinct Chadwick Beach cotton mouse was endemic to the Englewood Beach area.

== Demographics ==
Historical population
| Census | Pop. | Note | %± |
|---|---|---|---|
| 1990 | 1,395 | | — |
| 2000 | 1,345 | | −3.6% |
| 2010 | 1,229 | | −8.6% |
| 2020 | 1,326 | | 7.9% |
U.S. Decennial Census

=== 2020 census ===
As of the 2020 census, Manasota Key had a population of 1,326. The median age was 69.7 years. 3.5% of residents were under the age of 18 and 64.6% of residents were 65 years of age or older. For every 100 females there were 88.1 males, and for every 100 females age 18 and over there were 88.6 males age 18 and over.

100.0% of residents lived in urban areas, while 0.0% lived in rural areas.

There were 759 households in Manasota Key, of which 5.7% had children under the age of 18 living in them. Of all households, 47.4% were married-couple households, 16.7% were households with a male householder and no spouse or partner present, and 27.1% were households with a female householder and no spouse or partner present. About 34.4% of all households were made up of individuals and 21.6% had someone living alone who was 65 years of age or older.

There were 2,062 housing units, of which 63.2% were vacant. The homeowner vacancy rate was 3.7% and the rental vacancy rate was 63.5%.

Racial composition as of the 2020 census
| Race | Number | Percent |
|---|---|---|
| White | 1,272 | 95.9% |
| Black or African American | 2 | 0.2% |
| American Indian and Alaska Native | 4 | 0.3% |
| Asian | 4 | 0.3% |
| Native Hawaiian and Other Pacific Islander | 0 | 0.0% |
| Some other race | 11 | 0.8% |
| Two or more races | 33 | 2.5% |
| Hispanic or Latino (of any race) | 30 | 2.3% |

=== 2000 census ===
As of the 2000 U.S. census, there were 1,345 people, 769 households, and 459 families residing in the CDP. The population density was 1,263.2 inhabitants per square mile (487.7/km^{2}). There were 1,867 housing units at an average density of 1,753.4 per square mile (677.0/km^{2}). The racial makeup of the CDP was 99.26% White, 0.15% African American, 0.30% Asian, 0.22% from other races, and 0.07% from two or more races. Hispanic or Latino of any race were 0.97% of the population.

There were 769 households, out of which 3.5% had children under the age of 18 living with them, 57.0% were married couples living together, 2.2% had a female householder with no husband present, and 40.3% were non-families. 35.9% of all households were made up of individuals, and 23.7% had someone living alone who was 65 years of age or older. The average household size was 1.75 and the average family size was 2.16.

In the CDP, the population was spread out, with 3.9% under the age of 18, 1.1% from 18 to 24, 8.1% from 25 to 44, 32.5% from 45 to 64, and 54.4% who were 65 years of age or older. The median age was 67 years. For every 100 females, there were 83.0 males. For every 100 females age 18 and over, there were 82.1 males.

The median income for a household in the CDP was $44,071, and the median income for a family was $57,059. Males had a median income of $58,750 versus $36,607 for females. The per capita income for the CDP was $40,759. None of the families and 4.7% of the population were living below the poverty line, including no under eighteens and 6.1% of those over 64.
