= Cape Haze, Florida =

Peninsula in Charlotte County, Florida, US

Cape Haze
- Cape
- Location in Florida
- Coordinates: 26°51′01″N 82°17′39″W
- Location: Charlotte County, Florida, US

Dimensions
  - Length: 30 miles (48 km)
- Elevation: 2.1 m (7 ft)
- Topo map: GNIS Placida

Cape Haze is a peninsula located in Charlotte County, Florida, United States. It is approximately 30 miles (48 km) long, and Cape Haze community has an elevation of 7 feet (2.1 m). Cape Haze is home to the Wildflower Preserve, once used as a golf course, and the Cape Haze Pioneer Trail. The 80 acre Wildflower Preserve is managed by the Lemon Bay Conservancy. The Cape Haze Aquatic Preserve includes 12,700 acres in the area including the eastern portion of Gasparilla Sound, Bull Bay, Turtle Bay and parts of Charlotte Harbor.

The modernist architecture Cape Haze Community Center is at 180 Spyglass Alley.

== See also ==
- Eugenie Clark
- Island Bay National Wildlife Refuge
