= Lemon Bay =

Bay in Charlotte County, Florida, US

Coordinates: 26.94°N 82.36°W

Lemon Bay is a long, narrow and shallow body of water covering 8,000 acres in Charlotte County, Florida and Sarasota County, Florida. It is protected as the Lemon Bay Aquatic Preserve, designated in 1986. It is one of five Charlotte Harbor Aquatic Preserves. The bay is fed by one Gulf pass, Stump Pass, and seven tributaries and includes areas of mangrove, marsh grass, and seagrass. It provides habitat for bird, invertebrate and fish species and offers fishing, kayaking, birding, wading and beachcombing opportunities.

The Lemon Bay Park and Environmental Center is a 210-acre natural county park in Englewood, Florida in Sarasota County, Florida. It includes black mangrove forest, mangrove fringe along the shoreline, and pine and scrubby flatwoods. Educational classes, guided nature and bird walks are offered at the site. The park has 1.7 miles of shoreline on the Lemon Bay Aquatic Preserve. The park includes a butterfly garden, canoe/ kayak launch, and interpretive nature trail. The park is located at 570 Bay Park Boulevard.

== See also ==
- Wildflower Preserve
- Lemon Bay High School
