= Placida, Florida =

Unincorporated community in Florida, U.S.

Placida is an unincorporated community in Charlotte County, Florida, United States. It is located near where County Road 771 becomes County Road 775, and the Coral Creek meets Gasparilla Sound.

Placida is part of the Sarasota-Bradenton-Punta Gorda Combined Statistical Area. The ZIP Code for Placida is 33946.

== Geography ==
Placida is located at 26°49′56″N 82°15′53″W, Placida has an elevation of three feet.

== Residents ==
- Danny Nix Jr., member of the Florida House of Representatives
