= Harborwalk =

Recreational trail in Punta Gorda, Florida, US

Coordinates: 26.938021°N 82.053774°W

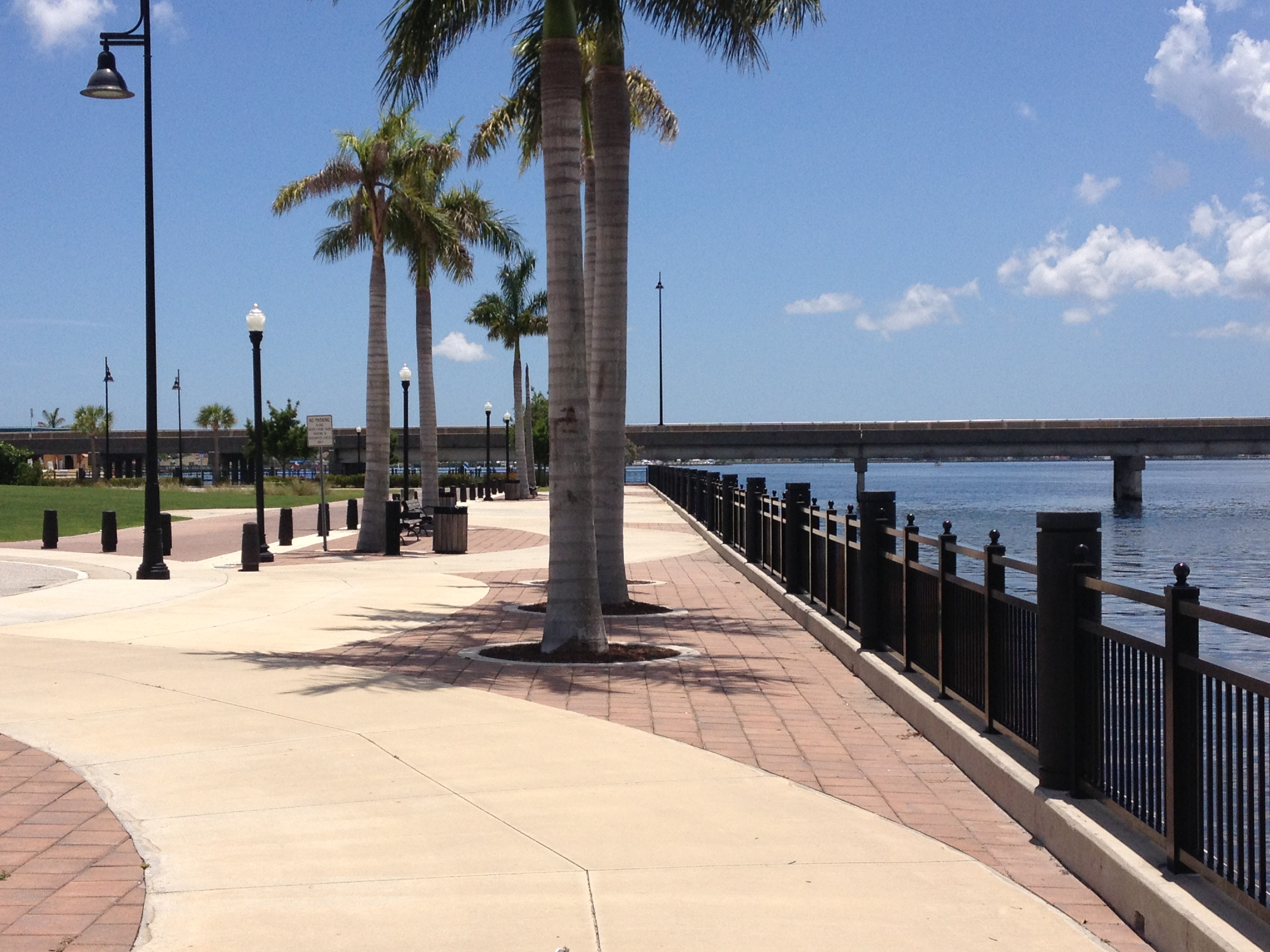
- Harborwalk along the Peace River
- Length: 2.4 mi (3.9 km)
- Location: Punta Gorda, Florida
- Trailheads: Fishermen's Village; Adrienne Street
- Use: Shared-use for walking and cycling
- Season: Year round
- Sights: Charlotte Harbor
- Hazards: Weather
- Surface: Concrete, asphalt
- Website: Punta Gorda Pathways

Harborwalk is a 2.4-mile (3.9 km) multi-use recreational trail located in Punta Gorda which runs along the Charlotte Harbor and the Peace River.

== Route description ==
Beginning at Adrienne Street near Bayfront Health Punta Gorda on Marion Avenue, the mostly concrete path runs along the mangroves of the Peace River a short distance before it shifts north slightly reaching Laishley Park.

The path runs on the north side of Laishley Park along the river, passing by the "Spirit of Punta Gorda" monument, a sundial commemorating the landfall of Hurricane Charley in 2004. The path weaves its way around the Laishley Park Marina before making its way back to the river bank.

After passing underneath the Barron Collier Bridge, the path passes by the Four Points by Sheraton Hotel, who operates a tiki bar along the path. It then passes by the Charlotte Harbor Event & Conference Center before passing underneath the Gilchrist Bridge.

The path continues through Gilchrist Park before ending at Fishermen's Village, a popular shopping and dining complex.

At Fishermen's Village, the Harborwalk connects directly to the Punta Gorda Linear Park, which runs back into downtown Punta Gorda though a residential area along the historic Florida Southern/Atlantic Coast Line Railroad right of way.

== Points of interest ==
- Trabue Park
- Laishley Park
- Charlotte Harbor Event & Conference Center
- Gilchrist Park
- Punta Gorda Residential District
- Fishermen's Village
