= Punta Gorda Linear Park =

Park in Punta Gorda, Florida, USA

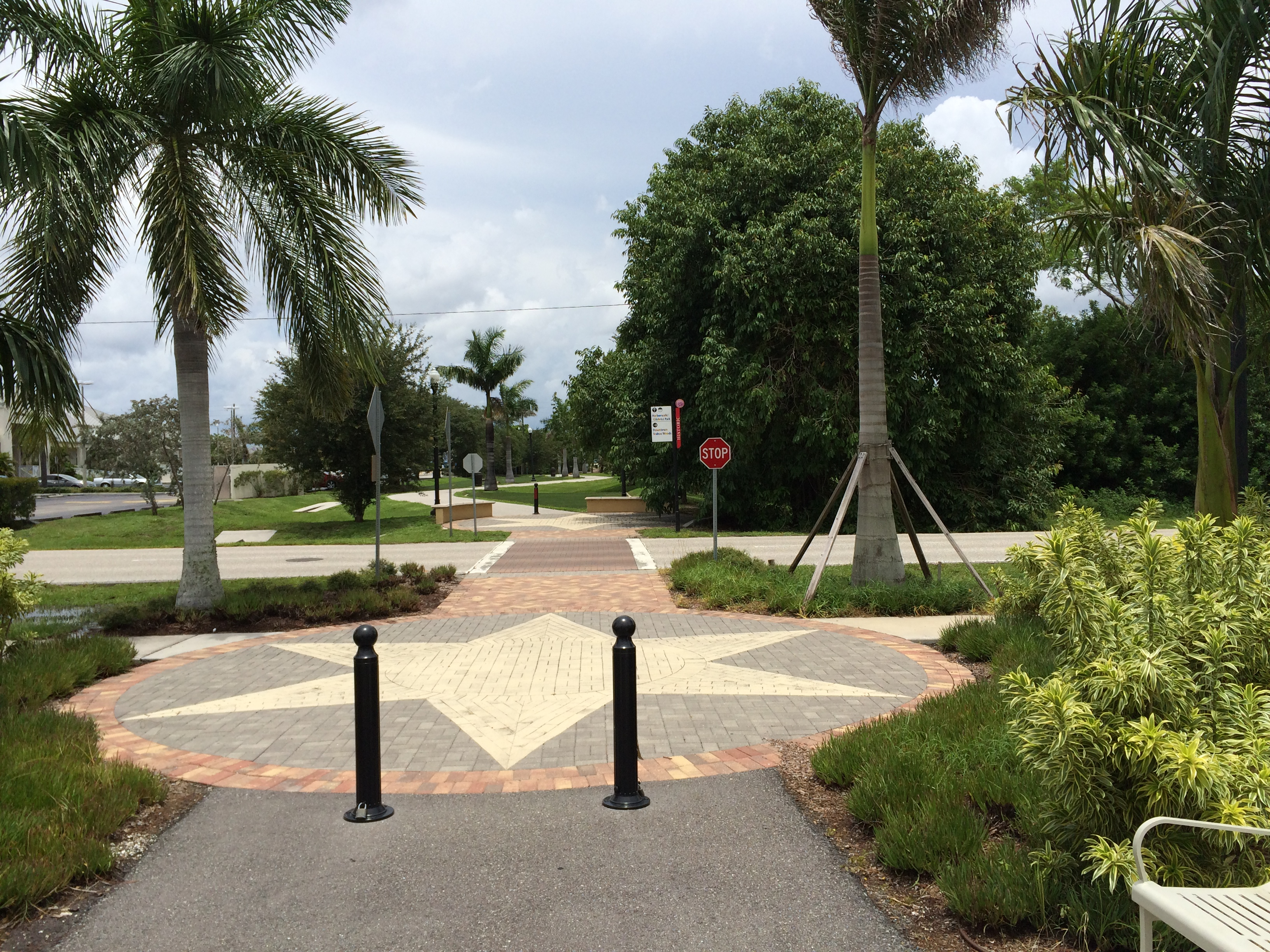
- Linear Park at Olympia Avenue near Fishermen's Village
- Length: 1 mi (1.6 km)
- Location: Punta Gorda, Florida, United States
- Use: Cycling, Walking, Hiking, Jogging
- Season: Year round
- Surface: Asphalt
- Right of way: Florida Southern/Atlantic Coast Line Railroad

The Punta Gorda Linear Park is a mile-long rail trail in Punta Gorda, Florida. It runs from Cross Street (US 41) near Helen Avenue southeast though a residential neighborhood to Fishermen's Village. Despite its short length, it connects to the Harborwalk at Fishermen's Village, which runs an additional two and a half miles northeast along the Peace River. It also connects to Punta Gorda's Shared-Use Path along Shreve Street.

== History ==
The Punta Gorda Linear Park runs along a former Florida Southern/Atlantic Coast Line Railroad right of way. First built in 1886, this railroad line was the Florida Southern's southernmost trackage (the rail line is still in service east of US 41 and is now operated by Seminole Gulf Railway). It was the terminus of the rail line until 1904 when it was extended to Fort Myers. The rail line provided service to the historic Long Dock in Charlotte Harbor (located near the site of the Isles Yacht Club) from 1886 to 1897. Some of the line was reactivated in 1928 to serve the Maud Street City Dock (which is the dock that Fishermen's Village resides on) up until the early 1970s.
