= Charlotte Harbor, Florida =

- Census-designated place
- Location in Charlotte County and the state of Florida
- Coordinates: 26°57′38″N 82°03′36″W
- Country: United States
- State: Florida
- County: Charlotte

Area
  - Total: 5.00 sq mi (12.95 km^{2})
  - Land: 2.32 sq mi (6.01 km^{2})
  - Water: 2.68 sq mi (6.94 km^{2})
- Elevation: 7 ft (2.1 m)

Population (2020)
  - Total: 3,784
  - Density: 1,630.9/sq mi (629.68/km^{2})
- Time zone: UTC-5 (Eastern (EST))
  - Summer (DST): UTC-4 (EDT)
- Area code: 941
- FIPS code: 12-11625
- GNIS feature ID: 2402764

Charlotte Harbor is a census-designated place (CDP) in Charlotte County, Florida, United States. The name Charlotte Harbor also refers to Charlotte Harbor (estuary) and Charlotte Harbor Preserve State Park, a 42,000-acre (17,000 ha) preserve with 70 miles (110 km) of shoreline along Charlotte Harbor in Charlotte County.

The population of Charlotte Harbor was 3,784 in 2020, up from 3,710 at the 2010 census. It is part of the Punta Gorda, Florida Metropolitan Statistical Area and included in the North Port-Bradenton, Florida Combined Statistical Area.

== Geography ==
Charlotte Harbor is located on the north bank of the Peace River, the main tidal inlet to the Charlotte Harbor estuary, itself an arm of the Gulf of Mexico. U.S. Route 41, the Tamiami Trail, crosses the Peace River between Charlotte Harbor and Punta Gorda via the Barron Collier Bridge (northbound) and the Gilchrist Bridge (southbound).

According to the United States Census Bureau, the Charlotte Harbor CDP has a total area of 5.0 square miles (13.0 km^{2}), of which 2.3 square miles (6.0 km^{2}) is land and 2.7 square miles (7.0 km^{2}), or 53.95%, is water.

== Demographics ==
Historical population
Census	Pop.	Note	%±
1990	3,327		—
2000	3,647		9.6%
2010	3,714		1.8%
2020	3,784		1.9%
U.S. Decennial Census

=== 2020 census ===
As of the 2020 census, Charlotte Harbor had a population of 3,784. The median age was 66.0 years. 11.0% of residents were under the age of 18 and 52.5% of residents were 65 years of age or older. For every 100 females there were 77.2 males, and for every 100 females age 18 and over there were 75.6 males age 18 and over.

100.0% of residents lived in urban areas, while 0.0% lived in rural areas.

There were 1,962 households in Charlotte Harbor, of which 14.0% had children under the age of 18 living in them. Of all households, 29.9% were married-couple households, 22.7% were households with a male householder and no spouse or partner present, and 40.5% were households with a female householder and no spouse or partner present. About 47.8% of all households were made up of individuals and 33.1% had someone living alone who was 65 years of age or older.

There were 2,671 housing units, of which 26.5% were vacant. The homeowner vacancy rate was 1.0% and the rental vacancy rate was 20.6%.

Racial composition as of the 2020 census
Race	Number	Percent
White	3,152	83.3%
Black or African American	226	6.0%
American Indian and Alaska Native	14	0.4%
Asian	49	1.3%
Native Hawaiian and Other Pacific Islander	3	0.1%
Some other race	78	2.1%
Two or more races	262	6.9%
Hispanic or Latino (of any race)	298	7.9%

== Notable event ==
On August 13, 2004, Hurricane Charley first made mainland landfall at the mouth of Charlotte Harbor.
