= Fishermen's Village (Florida) =

- Location: Punta Gorda, Florida, United States
- Coordinates: 26°55′43″N 82°3′49″W
- Address: 1200 W. Retta Esplanade
- Opened: 1980
- Developer: Don Donelson
- Owner: Arciterra Group LLC
- Num. of stores: 30+
- Floors: 2

Fishermen's Village is a waterfront shopping, entertainment, and resort complex located along Charlotte Harbor in Punta Gorda, Florida. It includes over 30 shops and restaurants and The Suites accommodations located on the second floor. It also includes a full service marina. Live music and other forms of entertainment are also common at Fishermen's Village

== History ==
While Fishermen's Village was established in 1980, the pier on which it resides was built in 1928. Known then as the Maud Street City Dock, it was built to replace the Atlantic Coast Line Railroad's dock at King Street (which itself was built in 1897 to replace the original 4,200 foot "Long Dock" located about a mile west of the current Fishermen's Village). The King Street dock needed to be demolished to make room for the construction of the original Barron Collier Bridge.

The Punta Gorda Fishing Company and the West Coast Fish Company began operating from the Maud Street dock, and later tenants included Gulf Coast Oil Company and Matt Week's Boat Shop. The Atlantic Coast Line Railroad, who operated the previous dock, connected their track to serve the Maud Street dock via a spur that once served the Long Dock (the Punta Gorda Linear Park adjacent to Fishermen's Village today runs along the former rail spur).

In 1939, a fire broke out on the pier destroying some of the businesses on the dock. The dock eventually fell into disrepair, but in 1977, radio personality Earl Nightingale and local developer Don Donelson took over the dock and built Fishermen's Village on it.

Arciterra Group LLC acquired Fishermen's Village in 2012. On June 27, 2023, US Bank filed for commercial foreclosure on the Fishermen's Village property.
