= Punta Gorda MPS =

- U.S. National Register of Historic Places
- Location within Florida Location within the United States
- Location: Punta Gorda, Florida
- Coordinates: 26°54′57.26″N 82°2′52.15″W
- MPS: Punta Gorda Multiple Property Group
- NRHP reference No.: 64500122

The following buildings were added to the National Register of Historic Places as part of the Punta Gorda Multiple Property Submission (or MPS).

Resource Name	Also known as	Address	City	County	Added
Charlotte High School		1250 Cooper Street	Punta Gorda	Charlotte County	December 12, 1990
Old First National Bank of Punta Gorda		133 West Marion Avenue	Punta Gorda	Charlotte County	March 14, 1991
Punta Gorda Atlantic Coast Line Depot		1009 Taylor Road	Punta Gorda	Charlotte County	December 12, 1990
Punta Gorda Ice Plant		408 Tamiami Trail	Punta Gorda	Charlotte County	December 12, 1990
Punta Gorda Residential District		Roughly bounded by West Retta Esplanade, Berry Street, West Virginia Avenue and Taylor Street	Punta Gorda	Charlotte County	January 7, 1991
Punta Gorda Woman's Club		118 Sullivan Street	Punta Gorda	Charlotte County	April 5, 1991
H. W. Smith Building		121 East Marion Avenue	Punta Gorda	Charlotte County	July 25, 1991
