= Charles P. Bailey (pilot) =

United States military officer and fighter pilot (1918–2001)

Charles P. Bailey Sr.
- Born: Charles Phillip Bailey; November 25, 1918; Punta Gorda, Florida, US
- Died: April 1, 2001 (aged 82); Deland, Florida, US
- Resting place: Greenwood Cemetery in Daytona Beach, Florida, USA
- Education: Bethune-Cookman University, Cincinnati College of Embalming
- Occupations: Military officer; fighter pilot
- Years active: 1942–1947

Charles Phillip Bailey Sr. (November 25, 1918 – April 1, 2001) was a U.S. Army Air Force officer and one of the Tuskegee Airmen's most decorated combat fighter pilots. He was Florida's first African American fighter pilot. He flew 133 missions over Europe and North Africa, and was credited with shooting down two enemy aircraft.

For his heroics during World War II, the U.S. Army Air Corps awarded Bailey four Air Medals and the Distinguished Flying Cross.

== Early life ==
Bailey was born on November 25, 1918, in Punta Gorda, Florida. Known to his family and friends as "Phillip", Bailey was the son of Archie Bailey and Josephine Bailey. Bailey grew up in a home on the corner of Punta Gorda's East Virginia Avenue and Wood Street with his eight siblings.

As a child, Charles P. Bailey delivered Punta Gorda, Florida's local Charlotte Herald newspaper in his neighborhood. During rampant racial segregation in the American South and in Deland, Bailey attended elementary and middle school at Punta Gorda, Florida's Baker Academy. Since Punta Gorga did not allow African Americans to attend its high school, Bailey moved with family out of town to attend high school at the all-African American Howard Academy in Ocala, Florida where he excelled in academics and football.

After graduation, Bailey attended the historically black university Bethune-Cookman in Daytona Beach, Florida, where he played football on a full scholarship. Though Bailey was interested in becoming a pilot, Bethune-Cookman University did not have its own civil aviation pilot program like fellow HBCUs Tuskegee Institute, West Virginia State College, Howard University, Hampton University, Delaware State University, and Virginia State University. Fortunately, Bailey had the attentive ear of Bethune-Cookman University's founder Mary McLeod Bethune, a confidante of First Lady of the United States Eleanor Roosevelt, President of the United States Franklin D. Roosevelt's activist wife. Bethune arranged for Bailey to transfer to Tuskegee Institute to enroll in Tuskegee's stellar aviation program.

== Military career ==
In August 1942, Bailey enlisted in the U.S. Army. On April 29, 1943, Bailey graduated as a member of the Single Engine Section Cadet Class SE-43-D, receiving his silver wings and commission as a 2nd Lieutenant. The U.S. Army Air Corps assigned Bailey to the 332nd Fighter Group's 99th Fighter Squadron. His classmate included Wilson Vashon "Swampy" Eagleson II (February 1, 1920 - April 16, 2006), one of the Tuskegee Airmen's most prolific combat fighter pilots credited with two confirmed enemy German aerial kills and two probable aerial kills.

In Fall 1943, the U.S. Army Air Corps assigned Bailey to the 99th Fighter Squadron as a replacement pilot in North Africa's Casablanca. He flew 133 combat missions throughout Central Europe, Germany, Sicily, Italy, France, and the Rhineland.

Flying his beloved P-40 Warhawk “Josephine" aircraft named after his mother, Bailey shot down two Focke-Wulf Fw 190 German fighters. Bailey also flew a P-51 aircraft named “My Buddy" in honor of his father.

During one of his aerial missions over the Mediterranean, Bailey was physically struck near his heart by shrapnel; fortunately, a Bible Bailey kept in his flight jacket pocket deflected the blow, protecting Bailey.

In 1947, Bailey left the military with the rank of 1st Lieutenant.

== Post-Military ==
Bailey reenrolled at Bethune-Cookman College, graduating with a bachelor's degree in Elementary Education. He became a school teacher in DeLand, Florida before eventually retiring after a few decades in the profession, returning to school to study mortuary science at the Cincinnati College of Embalming. He later opened the Charles P. Bailey Funeral Home which served the Deland, Florida community for decades until Bailey's children merged the funeral home with local Deland, Florida's J. E. Cusack Mortuary on October 17, 2014.

In 1995, doctors diagnosed Bailey with Alzheimer's disease. In 2000, Bailey went missing after wandering from his home in Deland, Florida. Initially, a search team was unable to locate him. When one of the search crew members shouted "Do you know anything about the Tuskegee Airmen?” a hungry, dehydrated Bailey suddenly responded "Yes.”

== Family ==
Bailey and his six male siblings have been called the "Fighting Bailey Brothers", as the men, along with their two sisters, all served in the U.S. military during World War II, the Korean War and/or the Vietnam War.

- Maurice M. Bailey (1906–1990): The eldest brother and Florida A&M University graduate served as a sergeant with the “Red Ball Express,” a predominantly African American outfit that supplied frontline white troops with munitions, food and fuel in World War II's European Theater. Also a veteran of the Korean War, Maurice was interred at Arlington National Cemetery.
- Paul Bailey (1922–1987): As a U.S. Army Private First Class, Paul was a chaplain's assistant assigned to the Western Pacific's Company D, 2805th Engineering Battalion. After World War II, Paul graduated from Bethune-Cookman College and the Boston Conservatory of Music with degrees in music.
- Berlin J. Bailey (1912–1997): As a U.S. Navy E-4 and electrician's mate 3rd class, Berlin served in World War II's Pacific Theater in the 3rd Construction Battalion which was front and center at Guadalcanal, one of World War II's fiercest battles in the South Pacific.
- Harding C. Bailey (1920–1984): As an E-5 electrician's mate 2nd class, Harding served in the Atlantic and the Mediterranean aboard the World War II destroyer escort USS Mason, the first Navy ship with a predominantly African American crew.
- Carl A. Bailey (1929–1957): The first African American jet pilot from Florida, the Florida A&M University graduate and his brother Arthur were the only of the Bailey Brothers not to engage in combat. At age 28, Carl was killed in a car accident near Fayetteville, North Carolina while on vacation from the military.
- Arthur J. Bailey (1925-1959): A corporal in the US Marine Corps, Arthur served on Iwo Jima during World War II.

In 1946, Bailey married Bessie L. Fitch Bailey (June 25, 1915 - December 6, 2008), a Punta Gorda, Florida native and Bailey's classmate at Bethune-Cookman University who served 25 years as Executive Secretary for Richard V. Moore, former Bethune-Cookman University President. Bessie previously served as educator Mary McLeod Bethune's personal secretary for 20 years at the National Council of Negro Women Headquarters in Washington, D.C. Bailey and his wife had two sons, Charles Bailey Jr. and James A. Bailey.

== Honors ==
- In 2000, the City of Deland, Florida honored Bailey with a bronze plaque.
- In 2007, a new terminal at Punta Gorda Airport was named in honor of Bailey and his brothers.
- In 2007, the City of Deland dedicated a bronze memorial bust of Bailey at the DeLand Naval Air Station Museum. Bailey's wife Bessie and fellow Tuskegee Airmen buddy Hiram Mann attended. Commissioned by Jim and Beverly Outlaw, the bust was made by artist Ralph Batten.

== Commendations ==

Badge	Pilot Badge		
1st Row	Distinguished Flying Cross	Air Medal with four bronze oak leaf clusters	Presidential Unit Citation
2nd Row	American Campaign Medal	European–African–Middle Eastern Campaign Medal with one bronze oak leaf cluster	World War II Victory Medal

== Death ==
Bailey died on October 14, 2001, in DeLand, Florida. He was interred at Greenwood Cemetery in Daytona Beach, Florida.

== See also ==
- Executive Order 9981
- List of Tuskegee Airmen
- List of Tuskegee Airmen Cadet Pilot Graduation Classes
- Military history of African Americans
