= Villa Bianca =

Historic house in Florida, United States

- U.S. National Register of Historic Places
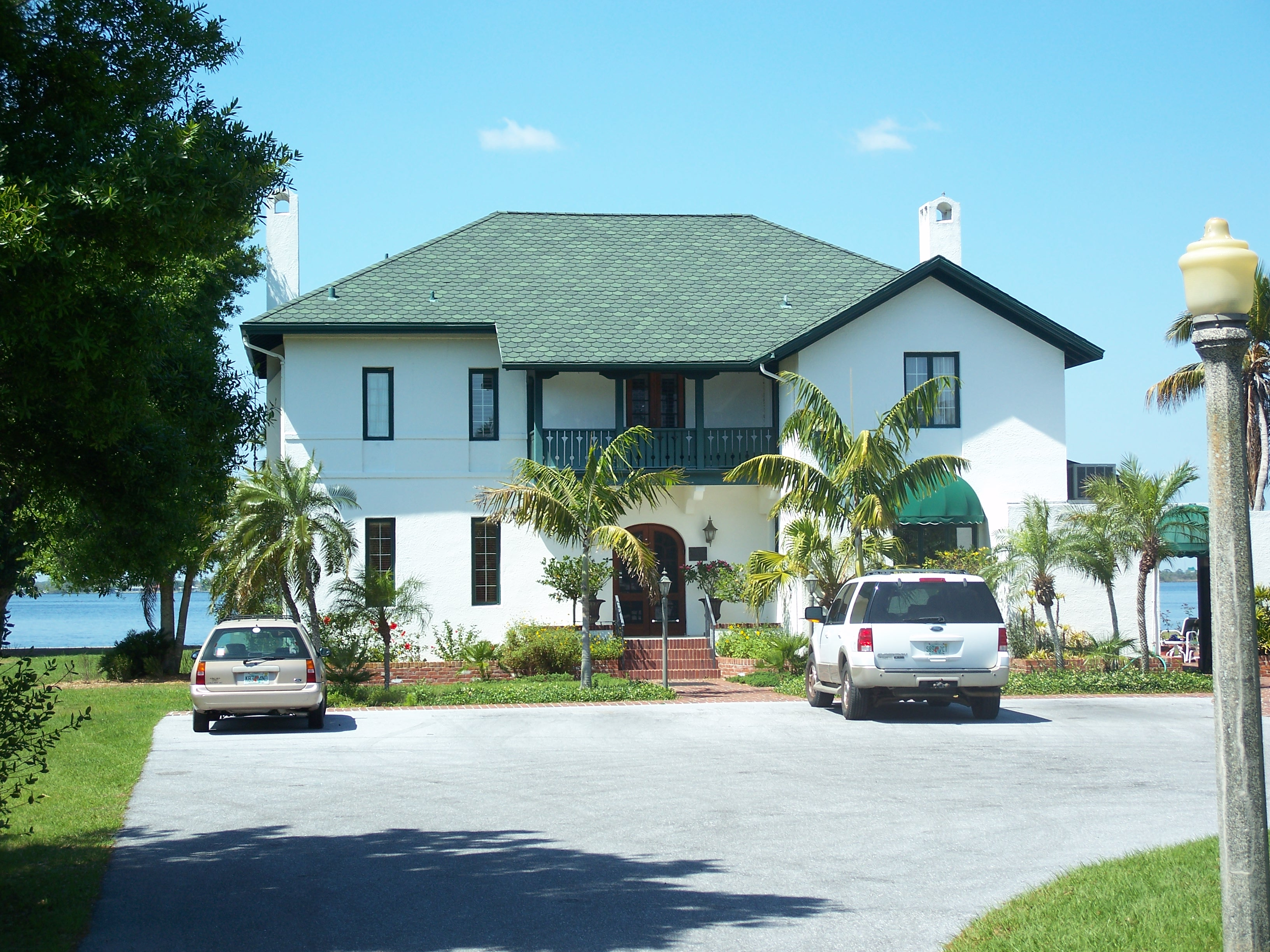

- Location within Florida Location within the United States
- Location: Punta Gorda, Florida
- Coordinates: 26°57′1″N 82°1′24″W
- NRHP reference No.: 90001760
- Added to NRHP: November 28, 1990

The Villa Bianca (also known as the Grunwell House) is a historic home in Punta Gorda, Florida. It is located at 2330 Shore Drive and was added to the National Register of Historic Places in 1990.
