= A. C. Freeman House =

Historic house in Florida, United States

- U.S. National Register of Historic Places
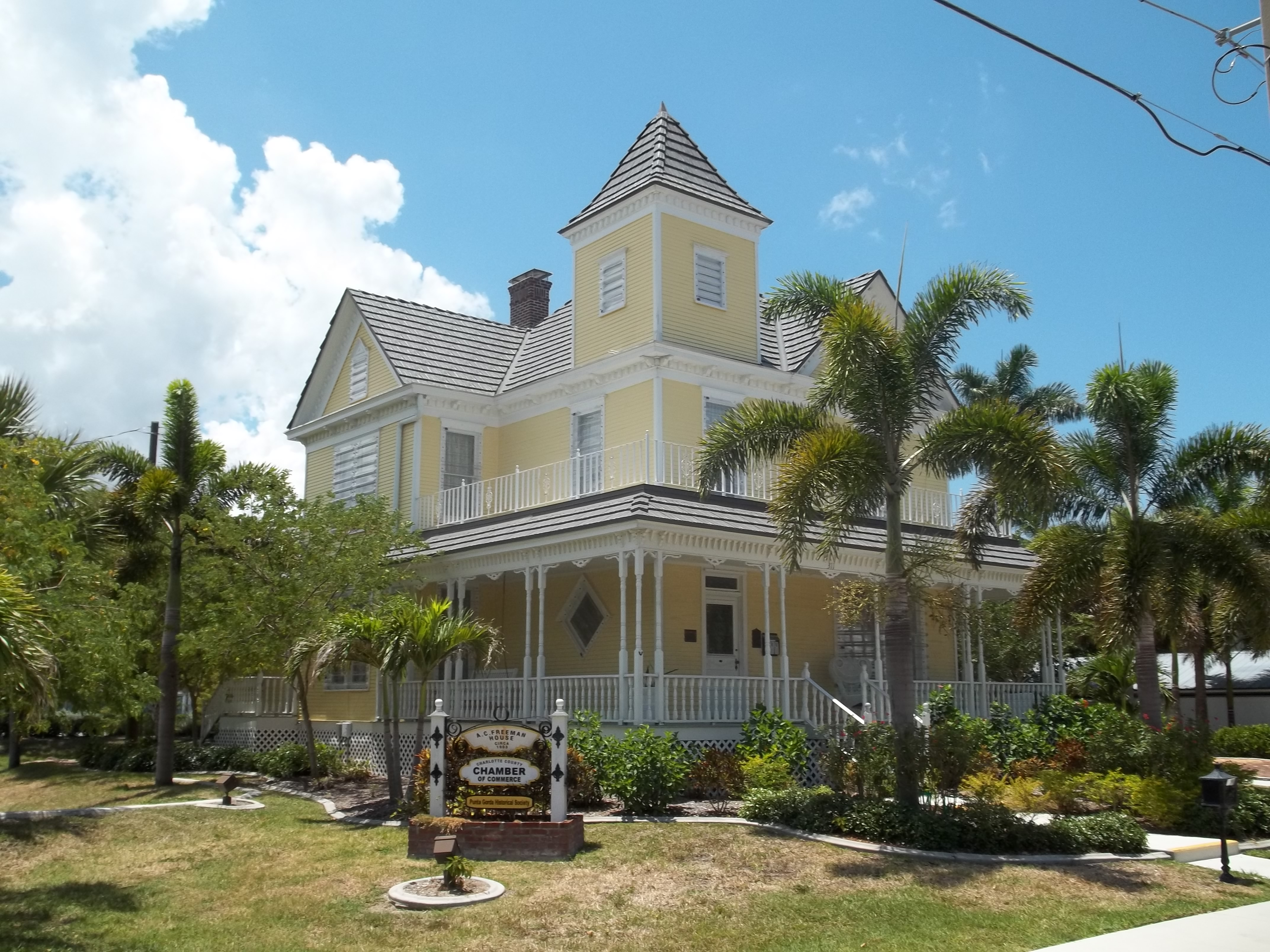

- Location within Florida Location within the United States
- Location: 311 West Retta Esplanade Punta Gorda, Florida
- Coordinates: 26°56′18″N 82°2′27″W
- Area: less than one acre
- Built: 1903
- Architect: Freeman, A. C.
- Architectural style: Queen Anne
- NRHP reference No.: 86003648
- Added to NRHP: January 7, 1987

The A. C. Freeman House (also known as the Gilchrist House) is a historic house located at 311 West Retta Esplanade in Punta Gorda, Florida. It was added to the National Register of Historic Places in 1987.

== Description and history ==
The house is owned by the City of Punta Gorda, Florida and is leased to the Charlotte County Chamber of Commerce. It is open to the public.

It was deemed significant for reflecting Queen Anne style architecture, asserted to be rare in South Florida, and for association with businessman and politician Augustus C. Freeman. Freeman owned a hardware store and a citrus grove, among other ventures. He served in various city government positions from 1896 to 1904, including as mayor during the later four or five years. During the 1902 mayoral campaign he was described as "'Industrious, frugal and obliging... well-to-do, but probably not a millionaire'".

The land was purchased by Freeman in 1903 from Albert Gilchrist, who later became Governor of the state, and there has been a local legend that the house belonged to him, but in fact it was built for Freeman.

The house was moved two blocks in 1985 before a restoration began, but the move was not deemed to have disturbed historic integrity. It was moved again in 2005 to city property following Hurricane Charley.
