= H. W. Smith Building =

- U.S. National Register of Historic Places
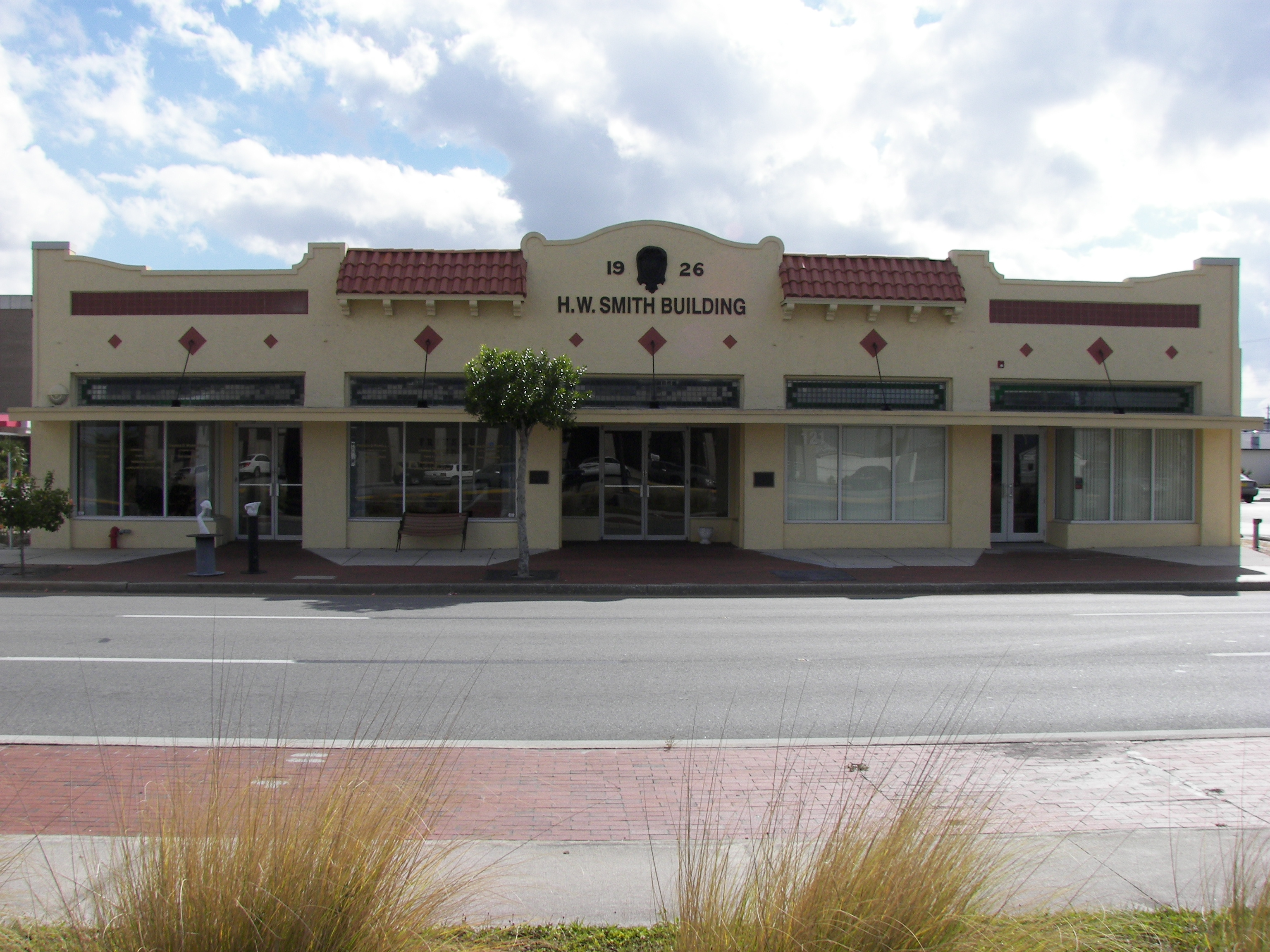

- Location within Florida Location within the United States
- Location: Punta Gorda, Florida, U.S.
- Coordinates: 26°56′9″N 82°2′57″W
- Built: 1926
- MPS: Punta Gorda MPS
- NRHP reference No.: 91000894
- Added to NRHP: July 25, 1991

The H. W. Smith Building (also known as the Smith Arcade) is a historic site in Punta Gorda, Florida, United States. It is located at 121 East Marion Avenue and was added to the National Register of Historic Places in 1991. As of 2023, the building houses The Perfect Caper restaurant and a Florida Department of Corrections state probation office
