= Clarence L. Babcock House =

- U.S. National Register of Historic Places
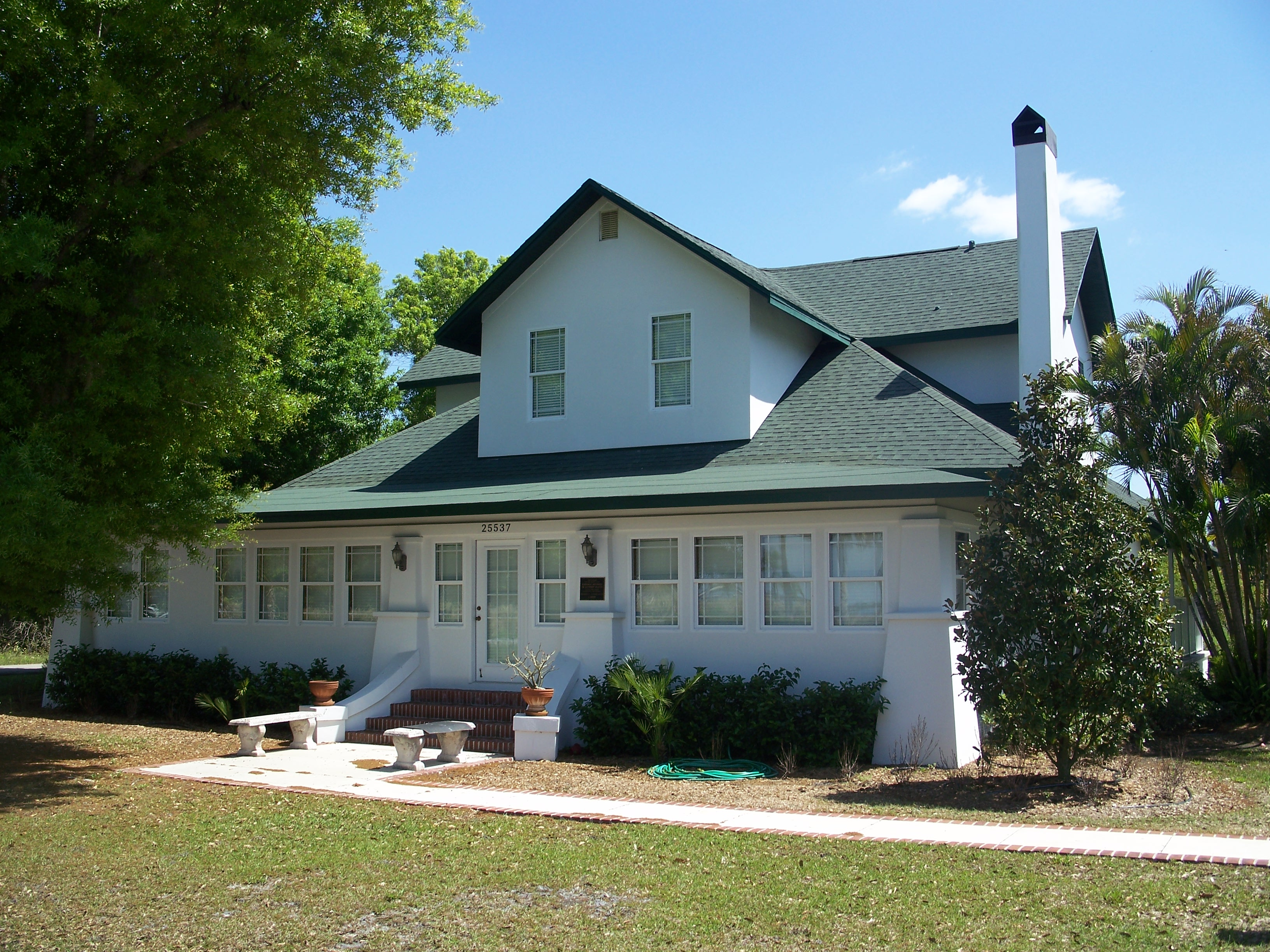

- Location within Florida Location within the United States
- Location: Punta Gorda, Florida, USA
- Coordinates: 26°56′56″N 82°1′35″W
- NRHP reference No.: 09000053
- Added to NRHP: February 25, 2009

Clarence L. Babcock House is a historic building at 25537 Shore Drive in Punta Gorda, Florida. On February 25, 2009, it was added to the U.S. National Register of Historic Places.
