= Old First National Bank of Punta Gorda =

The First National Bank of Punta Gorda
- Industry: Banking
- Founded: 1912; 114 years ago
- Defunct: 1929; 97 years ago
- Fate: Failed in 1929
- Headquarters: Punta Gorda, Florida

- The First National Bank of Punta Gorda
- U.S. National Register of Historic Places
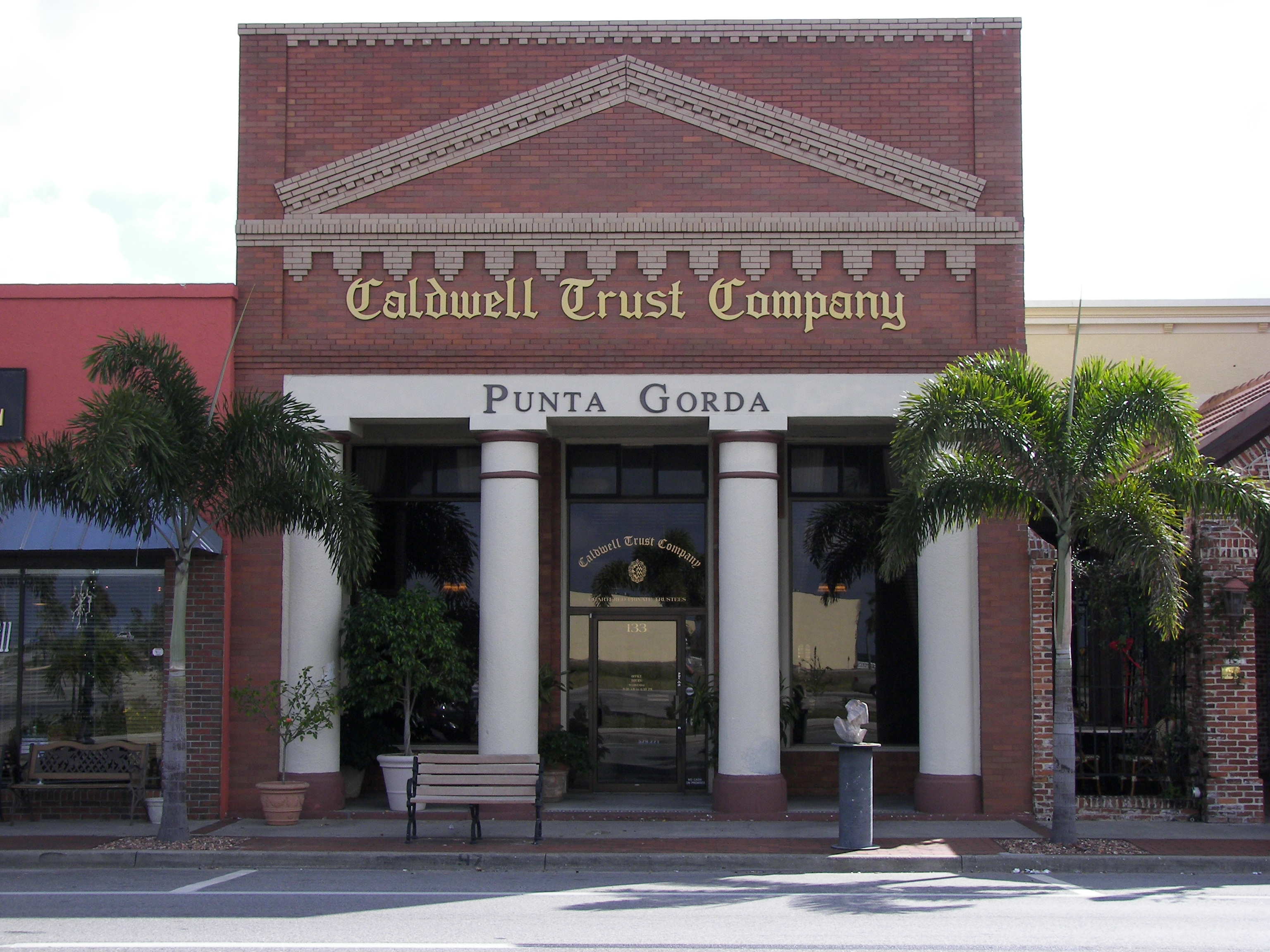

- Location within Florida Location within the United States
- Location: Punta Gorda, Florida, United States
- Coordinates: 26°56′6″N 82°3′2″W
- Built: 1912
- MPS: Punta Gorda MPS
- NRHP reference No.: 91000280
- Added to NRHP: March 14, 1991

The First National Bank of Punta Gorda (also known as the Old Merchants Bank of Punta Gorda) was a bank headquartered in Punta Gorda, Florida. It was state chartered in 1912 as the Merchants Bank of Punta Gorda, the city's second bank, and took a federal charter as the First National Bank of Punta Gorda in 1914. It failed in 1929, when all three banks in Punta Gorda closed after the collapse of the Florida land boom, and did not reopen.

On March 14, 1991, its branch location was added to the National Register of Historic Places.
