= Punta Gorda Woman's Club =

- U.S. National Register of Historic Places
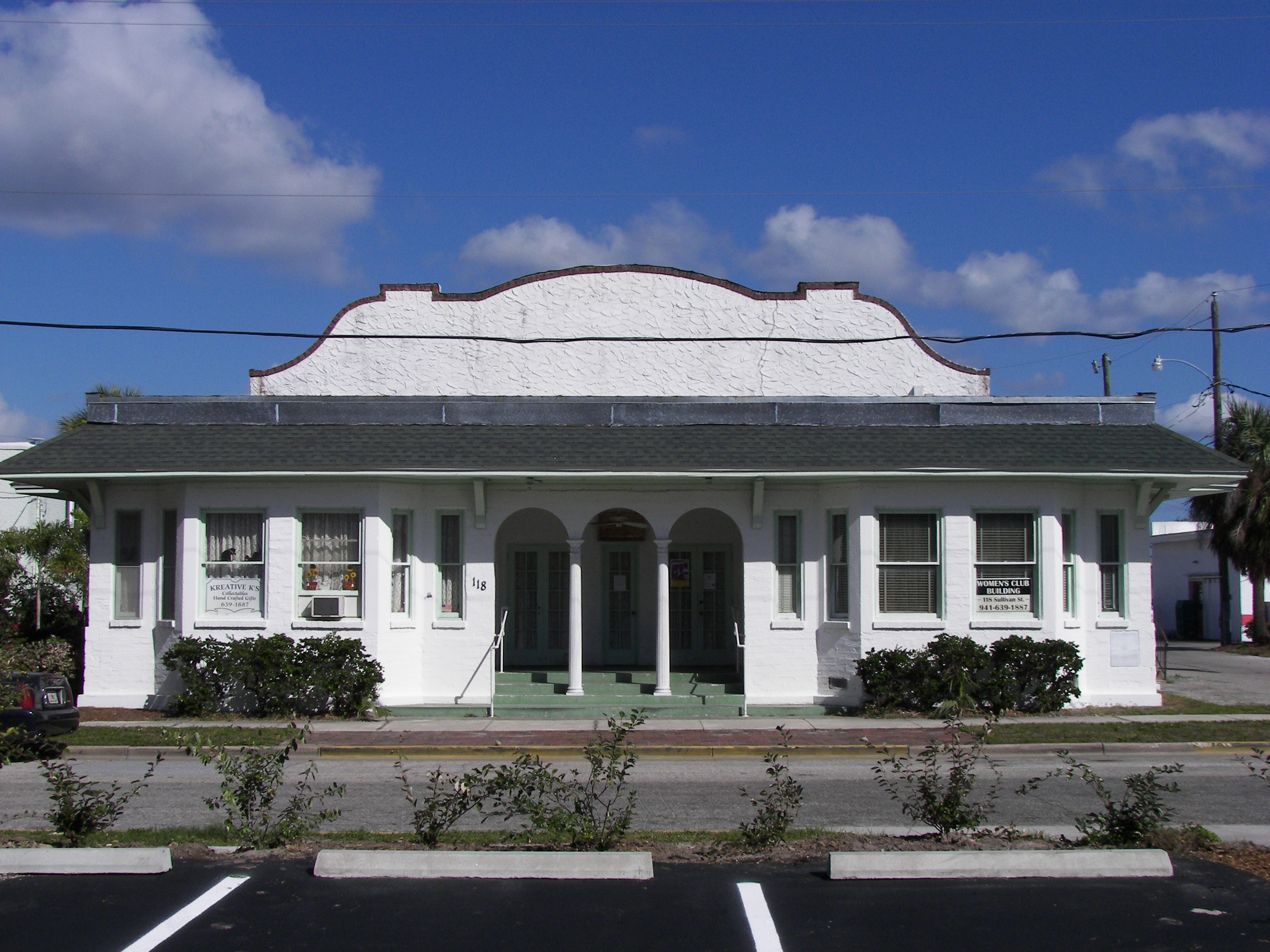

- Location within Florida Location within the United States
- Location: Punta Gorda, Florida, U.S.
- Coordinates: 26°56′6″N 82°3′8″W
- Built: 1925
- Architectural style: Mediterranean Revival
- MPS: Punta Gorda MPS
- NRHP reference No.: 91000382
- Added to NRHP: April 5, 1991

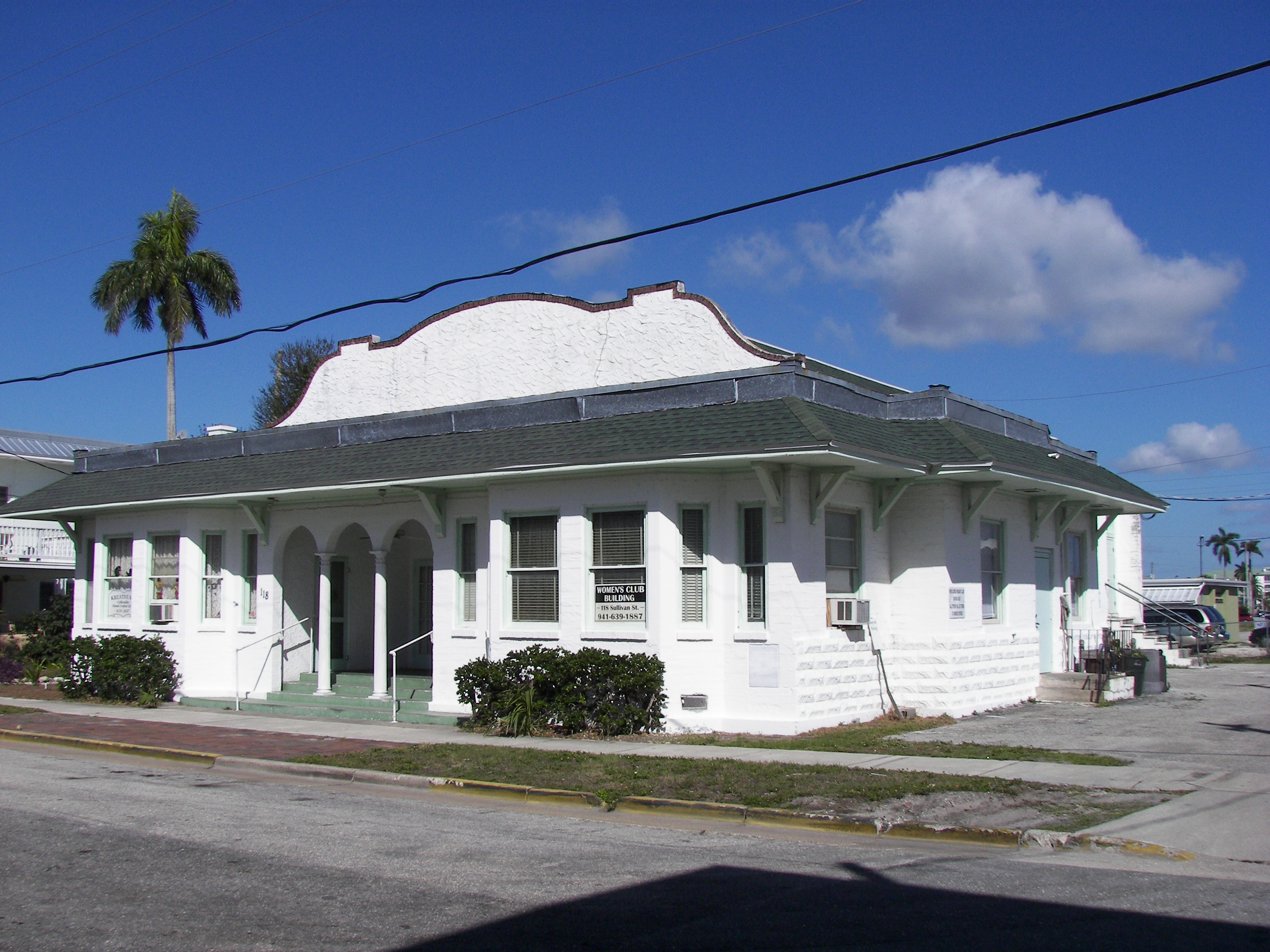

The Punta Gorda Woman's Club is a historic woman's club in Punta Gorda, Florida, United States. It is located at 118 Sullivan Street, and at one point was the area's first community library. Tt was added to the National Register of Historic Places in 1991.

The building is owned by the Punta Gorda Historical Society.
