= Punta Gorda Residential District =

Historic district in Florida, United States

- U.S. National Register of Historic Places
- U.S. Historic district
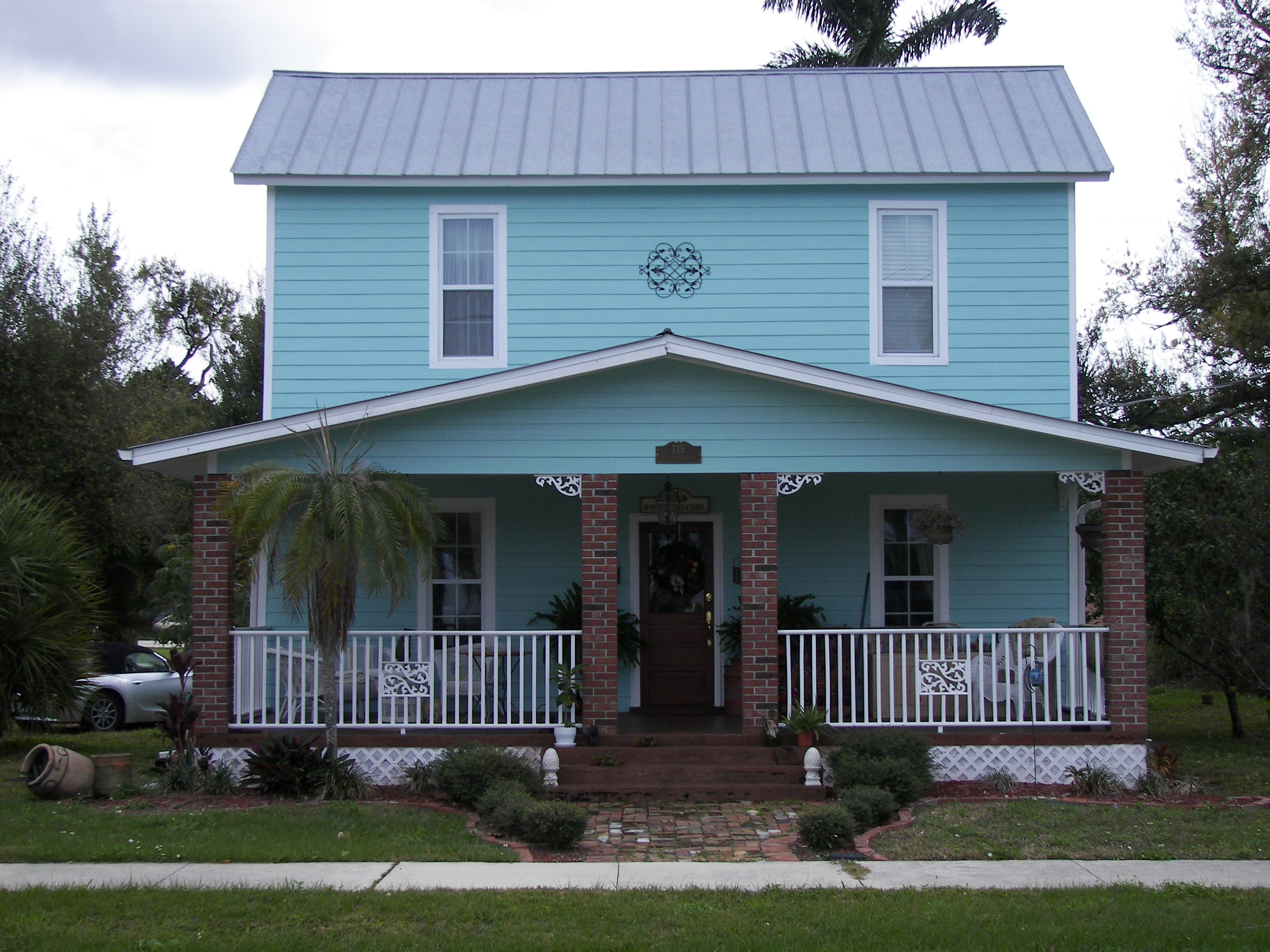

- Location within Florida Location within the United States
- Location: Charlotte County, Florida, USA
- Nearest city: Punta Gorda, Florida
- Coordinates: 26°55′53″N 82°3′12″W
- Area: 500 acres (2.0 km^{2})
- MPS: Punta Gorda MPS
- NRHP reference No.: 90002103
- Added to NRHP: January 7, 1991

The Punta Gorda Residential District is a U.S. historic district (designated as such on January 7, 1991) located in Punta Gorda, Florida. The district is bounded by West Retta Esplanade, Berry Street, West Virginia Avenue and Taylor Street.

== History ==
Twenty-two city blocks are included in the National Register District, which extends west from the city's commercial core and contains 125 mostly residential structures. The noteworthy era for the district was 1884 to 1930 with both wood-frame vernacular buildings and American Queen Anne style architecture, built during the mid-1880s through the late 1910s. Several structures are examples of the Florida land boom of the 1920s.

=== Hurricane Charley ===
Hurricane Charley wreaked havoc on houses that had survived storms for a century. The area has since been rebuilt.
