= Hiram Mann =

American fighter pilot (1921–2014)

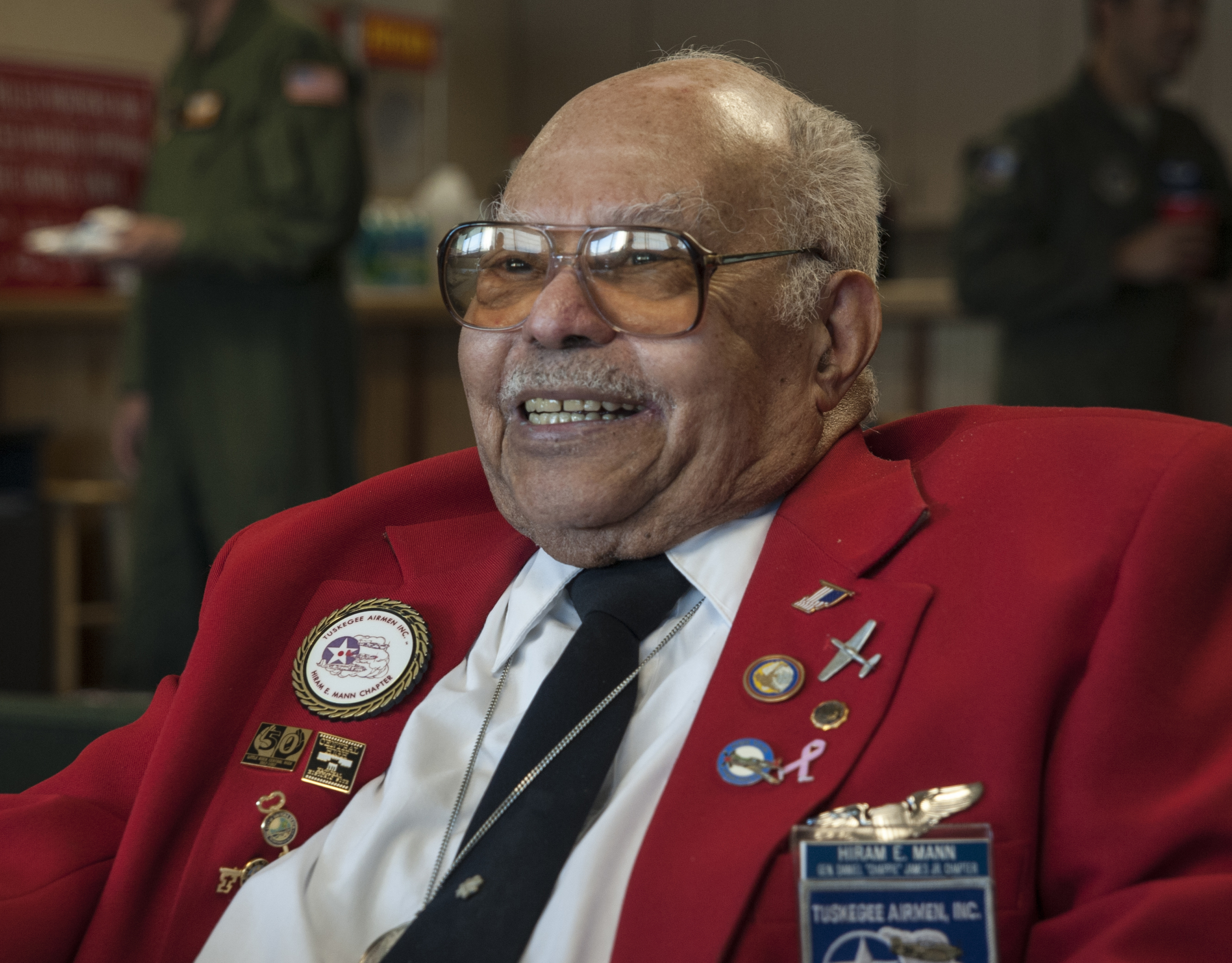
- Mann visiting Joint Base Charleston in 2012
- Born: May 23, 1921; New York City, U.S.
- Died: May 17, 2014 (aged 92) Titusville, Florida, U.S.
- Allegiance: United States
- Branch: United States Air Force
- Rank: Lieutenant colonel
- Conflicts: World War II
- Education: Philander Smith College
- Spouse: Kathadaza Mann (m. 1940)
- Children: 1

Hiram Mann (May 23, 1921 – May 17, 2014) was an American aviator, retired lieutenant colonel in the United States Air Force, and member of the Tuskegee Airmen's 332nd Fighter Group, an elite squadron of African-American airmen during World War II. Mann flew forty-eight missions over Europe as a member of the 332nd Fighter Group during the war. Mann was a member of the "Red Tails," as the Tuskegee Airmen were called at the time, so-called because the tails of the P-51D Mustangs flown by the African-American pilots in combat missions were painted crimson red. (The term "Tuskegee Airmen" did not come into use until the creation of a veteran's organization in 1972). Mann nicknamed his own fighter plane "The Iron Lady" after his wife.

== Early life ==
He was born in New York City on May 23, 1921. His parents had moved north from Alabama to New York in search of better opportunities. The family moved to Cleveland, Ohio, when Mann was still a toddler, where he attended integrated schools. As a child, Mann dreamed of becoming a pilot, often building model aircraft. By his own admission Mann thought he had little chance of piloting actual aircraft, telling a Florida newspaper in 2008, "We made model airplanes. I used to save my pennies to go to the hobby shop and buy balsa wood to make airplanes...I never thought I would have a chance to actually fly an airplane."

Mann found work as a bellhop at the Hotel Cleveland after graduating from high school. He told the hotel that he was 21 years old instead of his actual age, which was 18 at the time. He left the hotel for a job at a steel-and-wire manufacturer when he learned that employment related to the defense industry would help delay mandatory military service. However, the work at the factory proved exhausting and he soon left the position. Mann also attended Philander Smith College in Little Rock, Arkansas where he met and married his wife, Kathadaza "Kitty" Mann, in 1940. He was also a member of Alpha Phi Alpha fraternity. The couple returned to Cleveland after approximately one year, where Mann resumed his former job as a bellman at the Hotel Cleveland.

== Red Tails and World War II ==
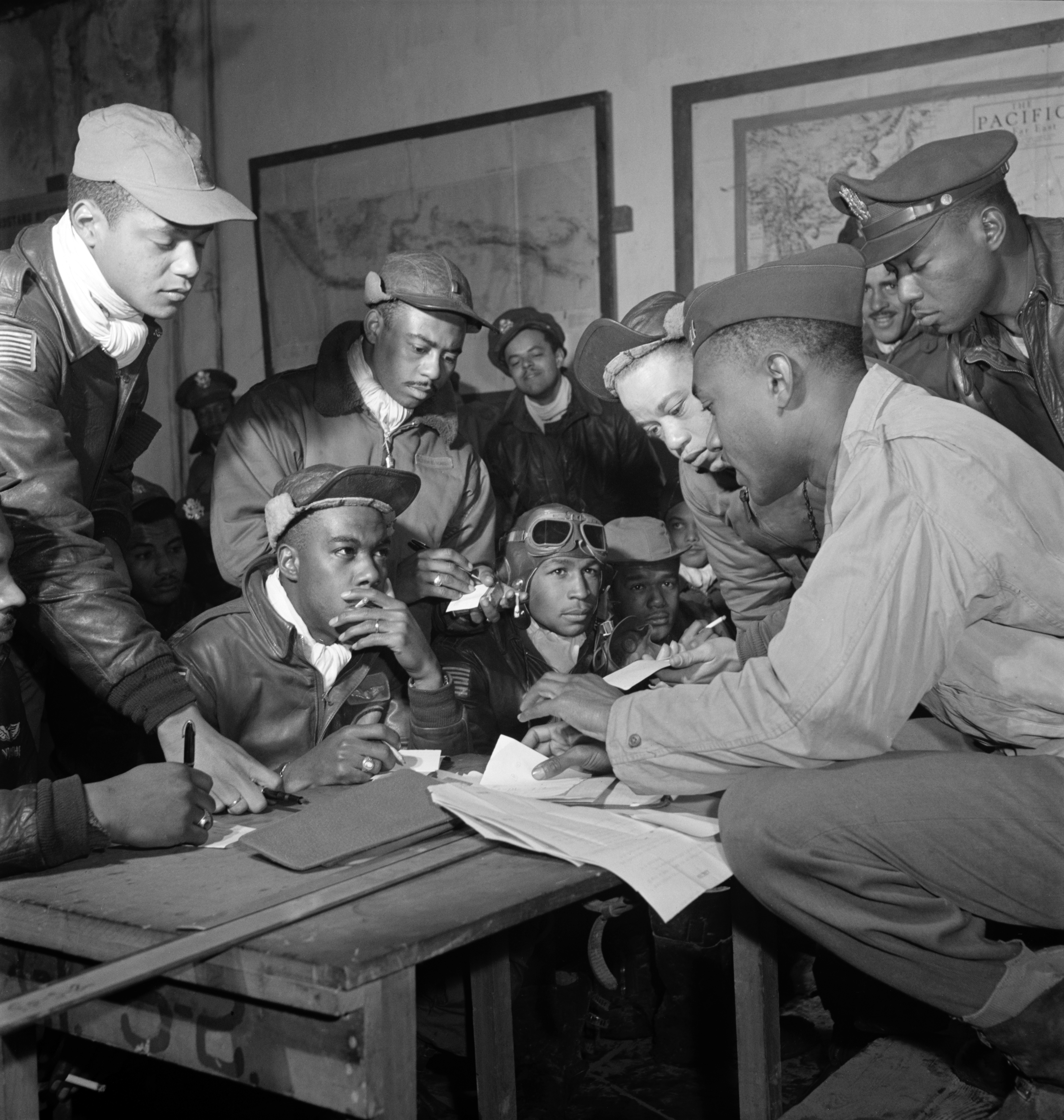
Hiram Mann (standing second from left) and other Tuskegee Airmen at a briefing in Ramitelli, Italy (March 1945)

Hiram Mann, while still working as a bellman, hoped to fly for the United States as a pilot during World War II. He faced a number of obstacles: his race, his marital status, and his level of education. His first application was rejected because of his race. Mann wrote a letter to the U.S. War Department but was rejected, "The first letter of rejection I received said — in no uncertain terms — there were no facilities to train Negroes to fly in any branch of the American military service. That ticked me off." Mann applied for a second time and received a second rejection because he was married and had completed only one year of college (the military wanted single men and required two years of college). Mann recalled, "There I was with three strikes against me — [only] one year of college, married and black."

Meanwhile, the U.S. government had begun training African-American aviators at Sharpe Field in Alabama in 1941. Mann applied for third time. Mann received a reply letter on December 7, 1942, saying that his application was on file and that he would be contacted when an opening becomes available. He was finally accepted into the military pilot training program in 1943 on his third attempt, based on a series of mental and physical examinations. His wife, Kathadaza, moved back with her parents in Chicago and finished college when her husband entered flight training program. She worked as a high school teacher during the war.

Mann completed his flight training and received his silver wings in June 1944 and became a "Red Tail," later known as the Tuskegee Airmen. Mann flew 48 combat missions over Europe during the war. Mann flew just two P-51D Mustang planes: He lost the first plane when it "was shot out from under me." He nicknamed both P-51Ds "Boss Lady" and "The Iron Lady," which were affectionately named for his wife. His flights included a number of strafing missions. He recalled the mission in 2008, "I could see silver streaks coming out from my plane. Then, I could see silver streaks flying past me. I thought, 'Gee, I'm flying faster than my bullets.' But in reality, it was the enemy's bullets coming back past me."

== Later life and career ==
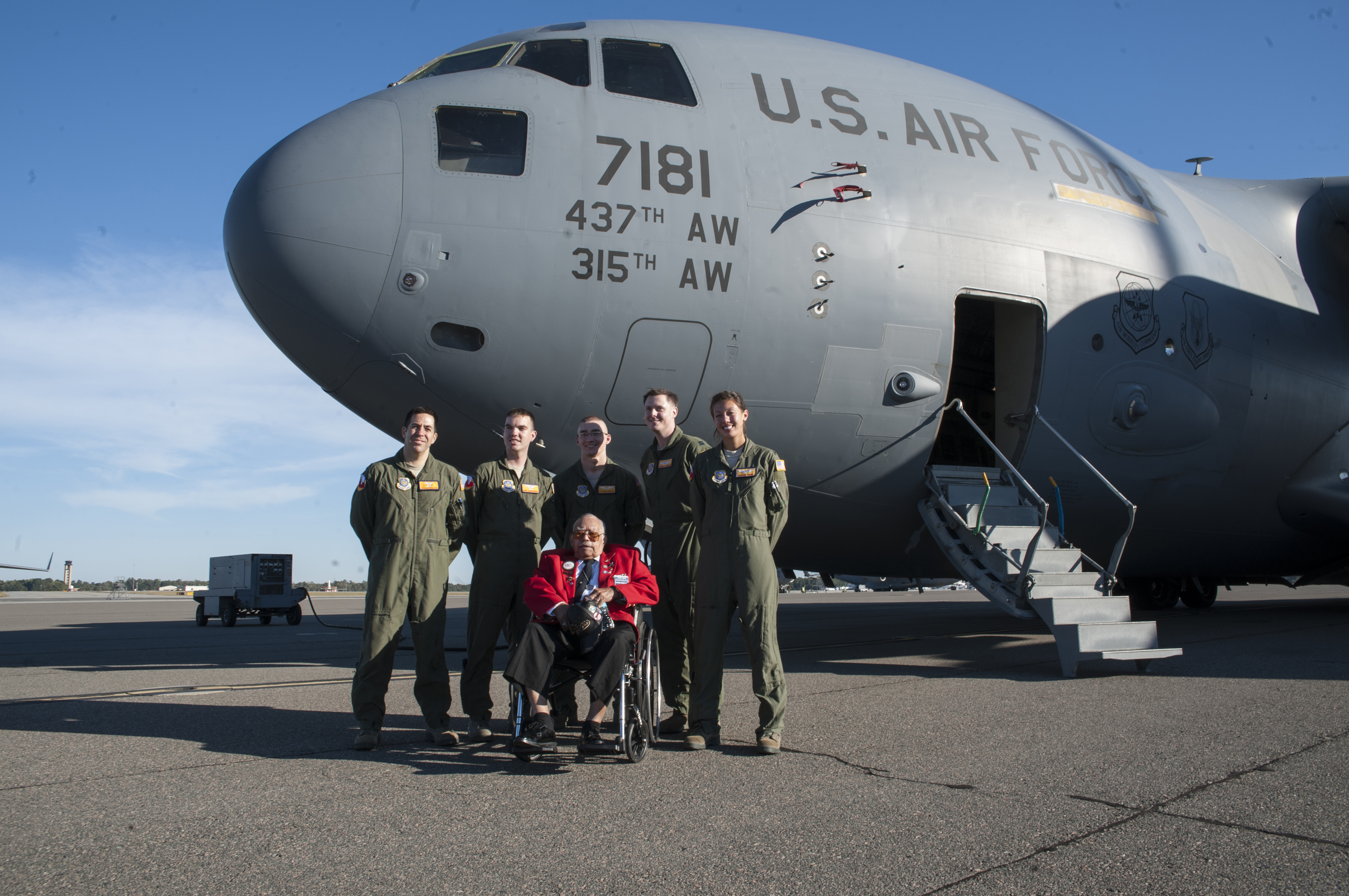
Lt. Col. Hiram Mann poses with airmen outside a C-17 Globemaster III at Joint Base Charleston (November 2012)

Mann pursued a career in the U.S. Air Force after the war and then entered the civil service. He retired from the military as a lieutenant colonel in 1972. He completed his bachelor's degree utilizing the G.I. Bill and later obtained a master's degree as well.

Hiram and Kitty Mann retired to Titusville, Florida, in 1974. Mann spoke extensively on his experience as a member of the Tuskegee Airmen. He often spoke at college campuses and school advocating for education and perseverance. In 2005, he attended the unveiling of a bust of Charles P. Bailey, a fellow Tuskegee Airman, which was placed on display at the DeLand Naval Air Station Museum in Deland, Florida. In 2013, he was one of four Tuskegee veterans who rode in a Model A Ford in Orlando, Florida's, Veterans Day Parade.

Mann was one of just six Tuskegee Airmen to attend the dedication of the Tuskegee Airmen monument at the Orlando Science Center in 2013. The Orlando monument is the first in the nation dedicated to the Tuskegee Airmen. An inscription on the plaque reads, "Their example inspires future generations to reach to the skies and to realize that all things are possible."

Hiram Mann died at a hospice in Titusville, Florida, on May 17, 2014, at the age of 92. His wife of 71 1/2 years, Kathadaza "Kitty" Mann, died March 2, 2012. He was survived by his son, Gene Mann, and three grandchildren.
