= Punta Gorda, Florida =

City in the United States

- City
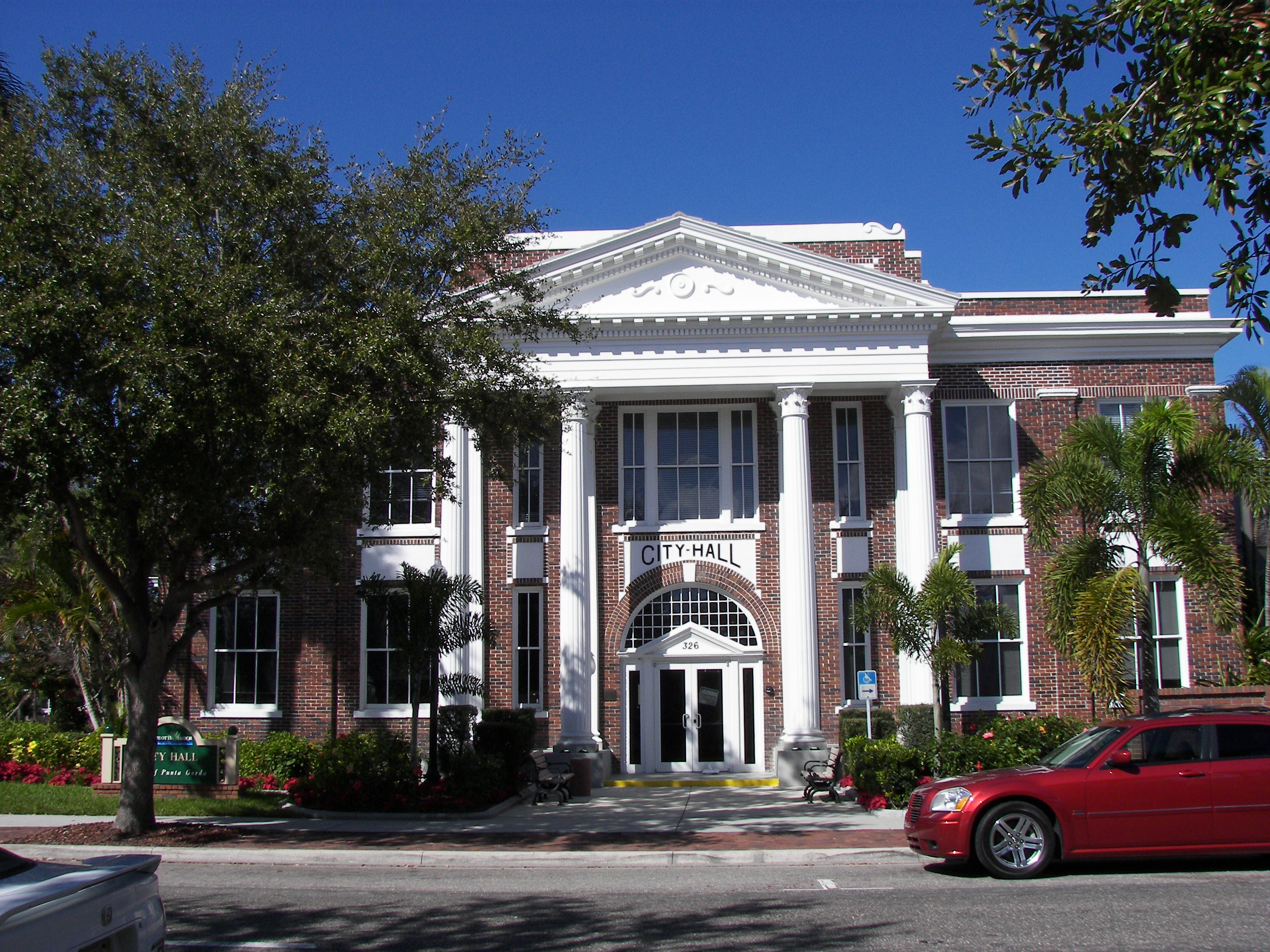
- Punta Gorda City Hall
- Etymology: Spanish: punta gorda, lit. 'fat point'
- Interactive map of Punta Gorda, Florida
- Location within Florida Location within the United States
- Coordinates: 26°52′50″N 82°03′25″W
- Country: United States
- State: Florida
- County: Charlotte
- Settled: 1882
- Incorporated (city): 1887

Government
  - Type: Council-manager

Area
  - Total: 21.87 sq mi (56.64 km^{2})
  - Land: 15.49 sq mi (40.13 km^{2})
  - Water: 6.37 sq mi (16.51 km^{2}) 28.52%
- Elevation: 7 ft (2.1 m)

Population (2020)
  - Total: 19,471
  - Density: 1,256.5/sq mi (485.14/km^{2})
- Time zone: UTC−5 (Eastern (EST))
  - Summer (DST): UTC−4 (EDT)
- ZIP Codes: 33950–33951, 33955, 33980
- Area code: 941
- FIPS code: 12-59200
- GNIS feature ID: 2404578
- Website: www.ci.punta-gorda.fl.us

Punta Gorda (/ˌpʌntə ˈɡɔːrdə/; English: Fat Point) is a city located in Southwest Florida, United States. It is the county seat of Charlotte County. As of the 2020 census, Punta Gorda had a population of 19,471. Punta Gorda is the principal city of the Punta Gorda metropolitan statistical area, part of the North Port-Bradenton Florida combined statistical area.

Punta Gorda was the scene of massive destruction after Charley, a Category 4 hurricane, came through the city on August 13, 2004. Charley was the strongest tropical system to hit Florida since Hurricane Andrew in 1992, and the first hurricane since Hurricane Donna in 1960 to make a direct hit on Florida's southwest coast. In the years following the storm, buildings were restored or built to hurricane-resistant building codes. The new buildings, restorations, and amenities concurrently preserved the city's past, while showcasing newer facilities. During this time, Laishley Park Municipal Marina was built and the Harborwalk, Linear Park, and various trails were created throughout the city for bicycle and pedestrian traffic.

== History ==
=== Early history ===
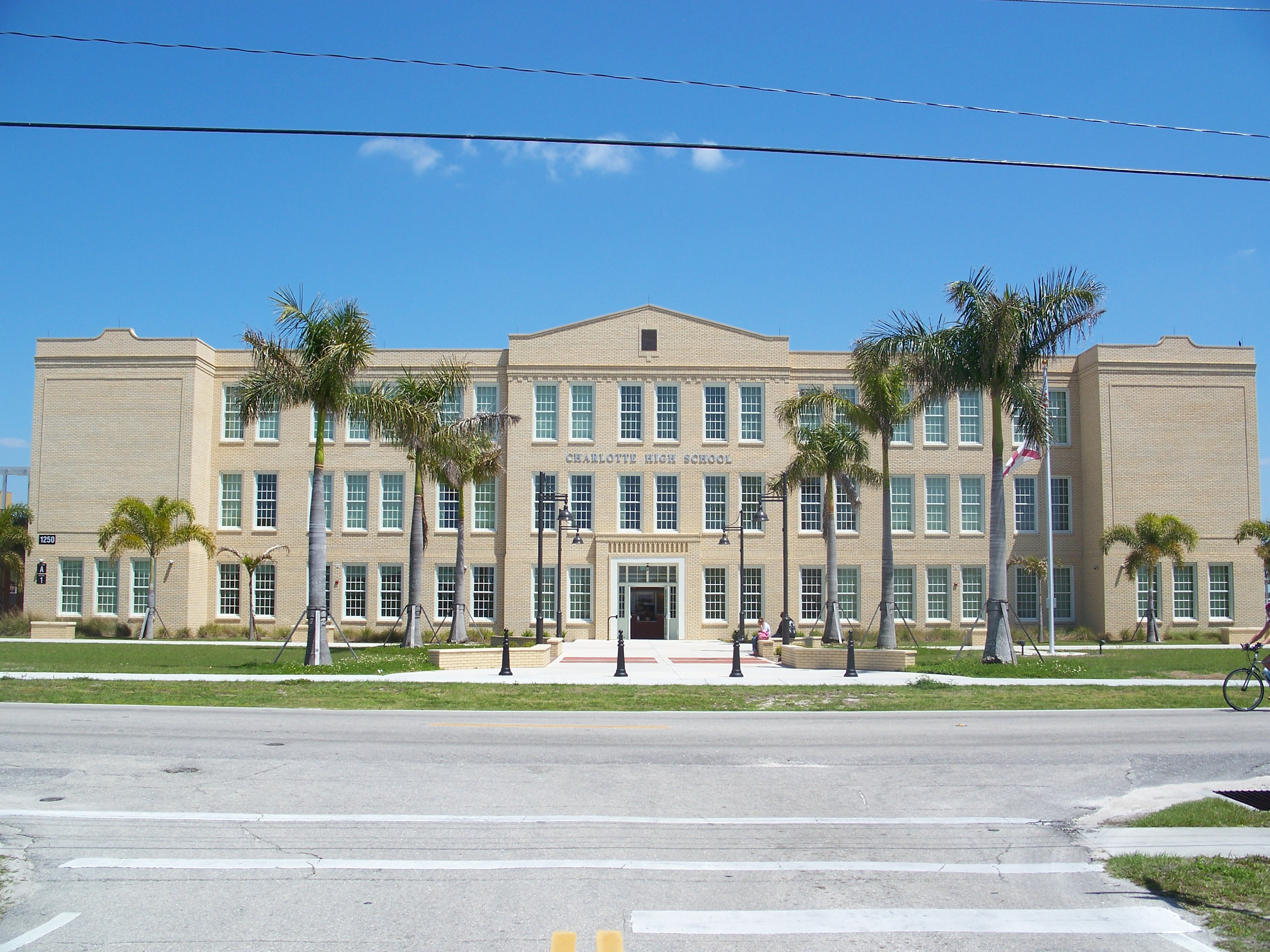
The historic Charlotte High School, originally built in 1926

Before the arrival of European explorers and settlers, the region centered on present-day Punta Gorda was home to the Calusa people. The name Punta Gorda (Fat Point) has been on maps at least since 1851, referring to a point of land that juts into Charlotte Harbor, an estuary off the Gulf of Mexico. In the late 1800s, White settlers began to arrive in the present-day Punta Gorda area.

Frederick and Jarvis Howard, Union Army veterans, homesteaded an area south of the Peace River near present-day Punta Gorda about a decade after the Civil War. In 1876, James and Josephine Lockhart bought land and built a house on property that is now at the center of the city. About two years later, Lockhart sold his claim to James Madison Lanier, a hunter and trapper, who lived there for two years.

In 1879, a charter for a railroad with termini at Charlotte Harbor and Lake City, Florida, was established under the name Gainesville, Ocala, and Charlotte Harbor Railroad. It was taken over by the Florida Southern Railroad, which reaffirmed Charlotte Harbor as a terminus in its own charter. In 1883, Lanier sold his land to Isaac Trabue, who purchased additional property along the harbor and directed the platting of a town (by Kelly B. Harvey) named Trabue. Harvey recorded the plat on February 24, 1885. At the time, Isaac was in Kentucky, and his cousin, John Trabue, was in charge of selling lots. To ensure his development's success, Trabue convinced the Florida Southern Railway to bring its road to his town on the south side of Charlotte Harbor.

The railroad rolled into Trabue in August 1886, and with it came the first land developers and Southwest Florida's first batch of tourists. Punta Gorda became the southernmost stop on the Florida Southern Railroad, until an extension was built to Fort Myers in 1904, attracting the industries that propelled its initial growth.

On December 3, 1887, dissatisfied with Trabue's lack of infrastructure development, 34 townspeople met at Hector's Billiard Parlor to discuss incorporation. The group voted to incorporate and rename the town after the Spanish name for the point on which it was located, Punta Gorda. Once Punta Gorda was officially incorporated, mayoral elections took place and a council was formed. The first mayor, W. H. Simmons, was elected.

Phosphate was discovered on the banks of the Peace River just above Punta Gorda in 1888. Phosphate mined in the Peace River Valley was barged down the Peace River to Punta Gorda and Port Boca Grande, where it was loaded onto vessels for worldwide shipment. In 1896, the Florida Times-Union reported that phosphate mining was Punta Gorda's chief industry and that Punta Gorda was the world's greatest phosphate shipping point. By 1907, a railroad was built direct to Port Boca Grande, ending the brief phosphate-shipping boom from Punta Gorda.

In 1890, Isaac Trabue appointed the first postmaster, Robert Meacham, an African American, as a deliberate affront to Kelly B. Harvey and those who had voted to change the name of the town from Trabue to Punta Gorda.

The Punta Gorda Herald was founded by Robert Kirby Seward in 1893 and published weekly during its early years. The newspaper covered such events as rum-running, other smuggling activities, and lawlessness in general. It underwent many changes in both ownership and name, and today is known as The Charlotte Sun Herald.

Early Punta Gorda greatly resembled the modern social climate of various classes living and working together. While the regal Punta Gorda Hotel, at one point partly owned by Cornelius Vanderbilt, reflected the upper class, Punta Gorda was a generally rough town, like most frontier towns. Its location at the end of the railway line spiked the crime rate, resulting in about 40 murders between 1890 and 1904. This included City Marshal John H. Bowman, who was shot and killed in his front parlor on January 29, 1903, in view of his family.

=== 20th century ===
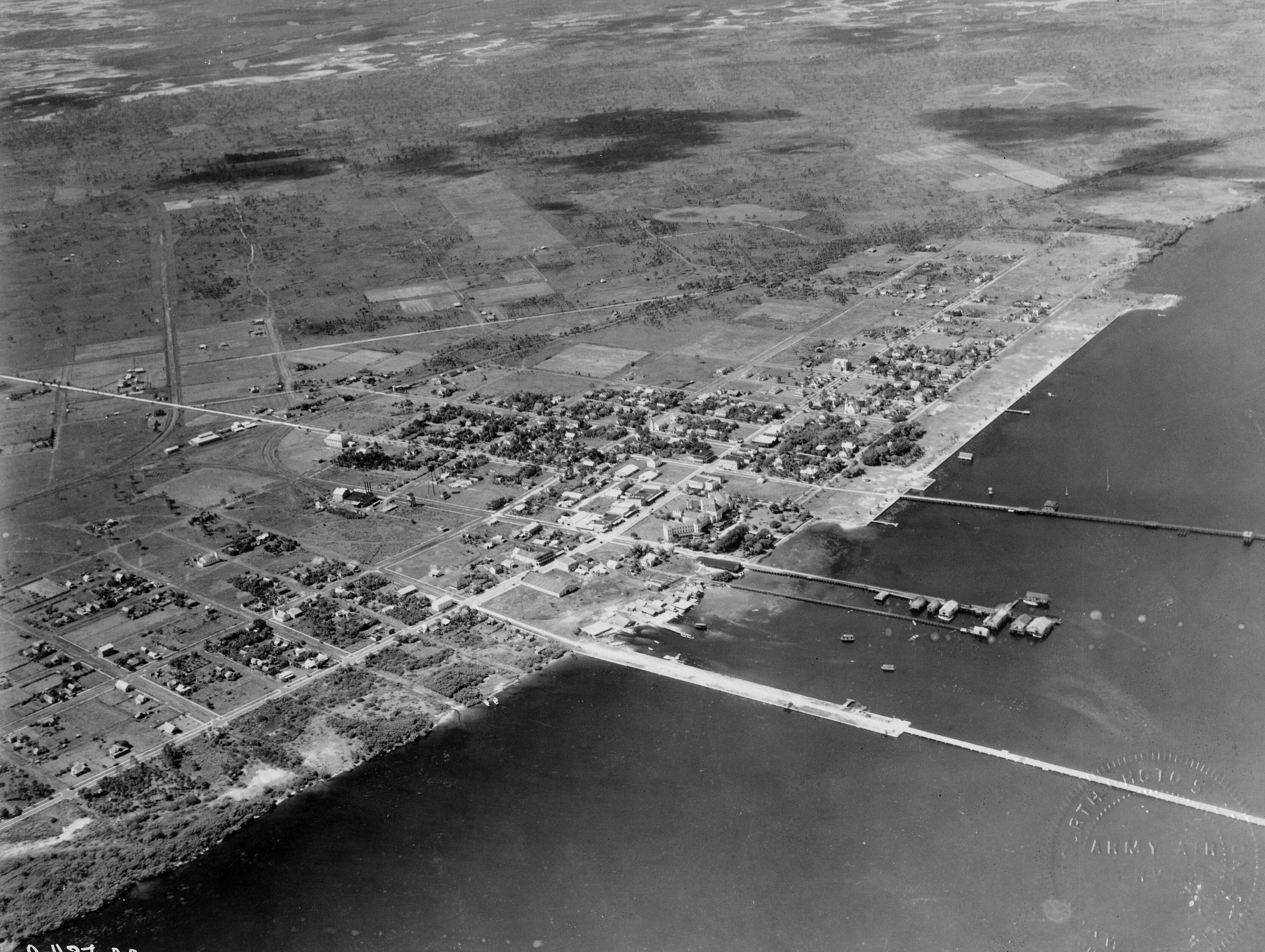
Punta Gorda, Dec. 1924

In 1925, a bungalow was built by Joseph Blanchard, an African-American sea captain and fisherman. The Blanchard House Museum still stands as a museum, providing education about the history of middle-class African-American life in the area.

Punta Gorda maintained steady growth. Charlotte County was formed in 1921 after DeSoto County was split. Also in 1921, the first bridge was constructed connecting Punta Gorda and Charlotte Harbor along the brand-new Tamiami Trail. This small bridge was replaced by the original Barron Collier Bridge in 1931, and then by the current Barron Collier Bridge and Gilchrist Bridge crossing the Peace River.

During World War II, a U.S. Army airfield was built in Punta Gorda to train combat air pilots. After the war, the airfield was turned over to Charlotte County. Today, the old airfield is the Punta Gorda Airport, serving both commercial and general aviation.

Punta Gorda's next intense growth phase started in 1959 with the creation of a neighborhood of canal-front home sites, Punta Gorda Isles, by a trio of entrepreneurs, Al Johns, Bud Cole, and Sam Burchers. They laid out 55 miles of canals, 100 feet wide and 17 feet deep, using dredged sand to raise the level of the canal-front land. This gave dry home sites access to the Charlotte Harbor and the Gulf of Mexico. Johns went on to develop several other communities in Punta Gorda, among which were Burnt Store Isles, another waterfront community with a golf course, and Seminole Lakes, also a golf-course community. These communities provided waterfront or golf-course homes for retirees with access to a downtown with shopping, restaurants, and parks.

In the early 1980s at the site of the old Maud Street Fishing Docks, a new shopping, restaurant, and marina complex, Fishermen's Village, was constructed.

=== 21st century ===
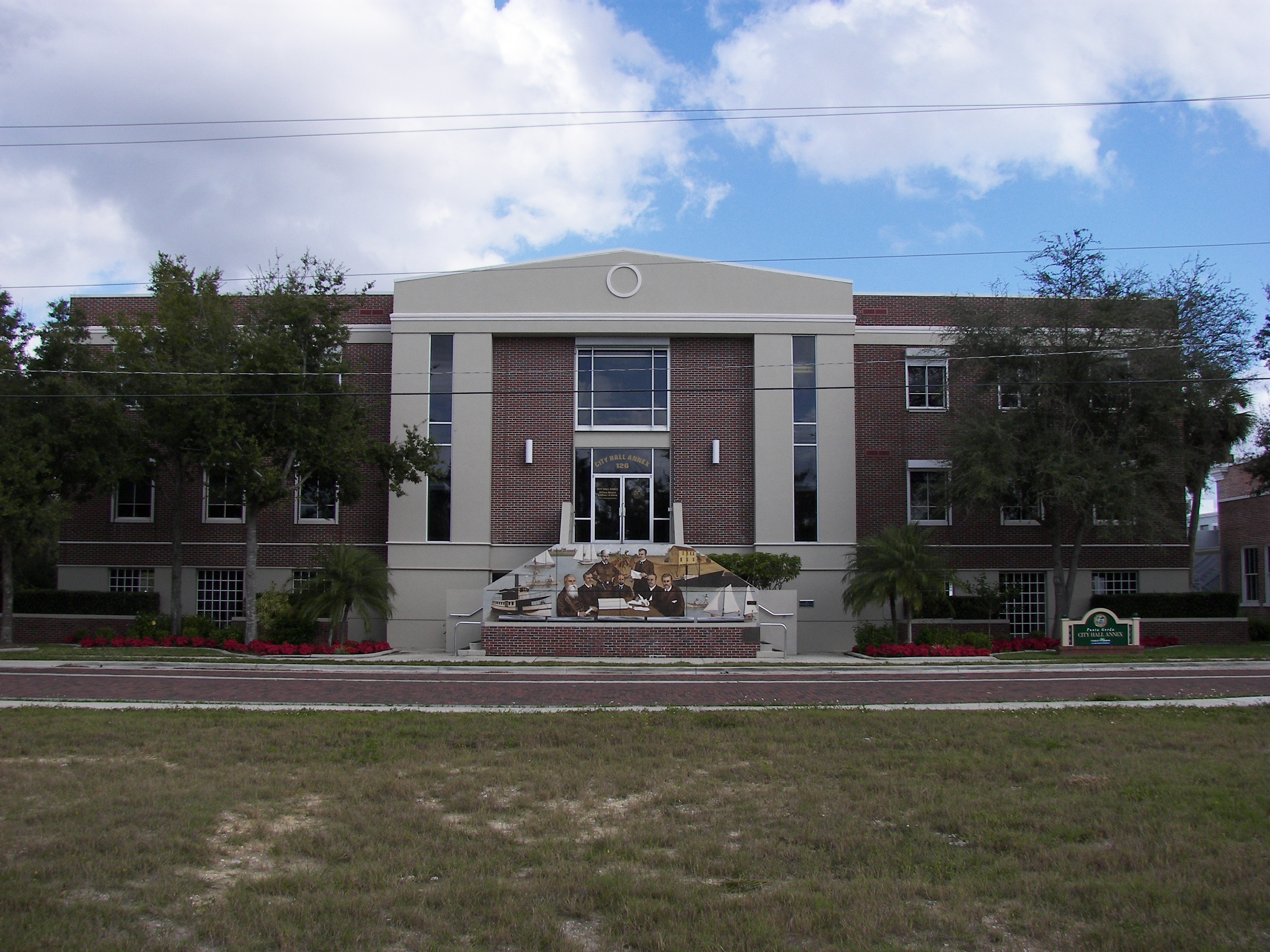
Punta Gorda City Hall Annex

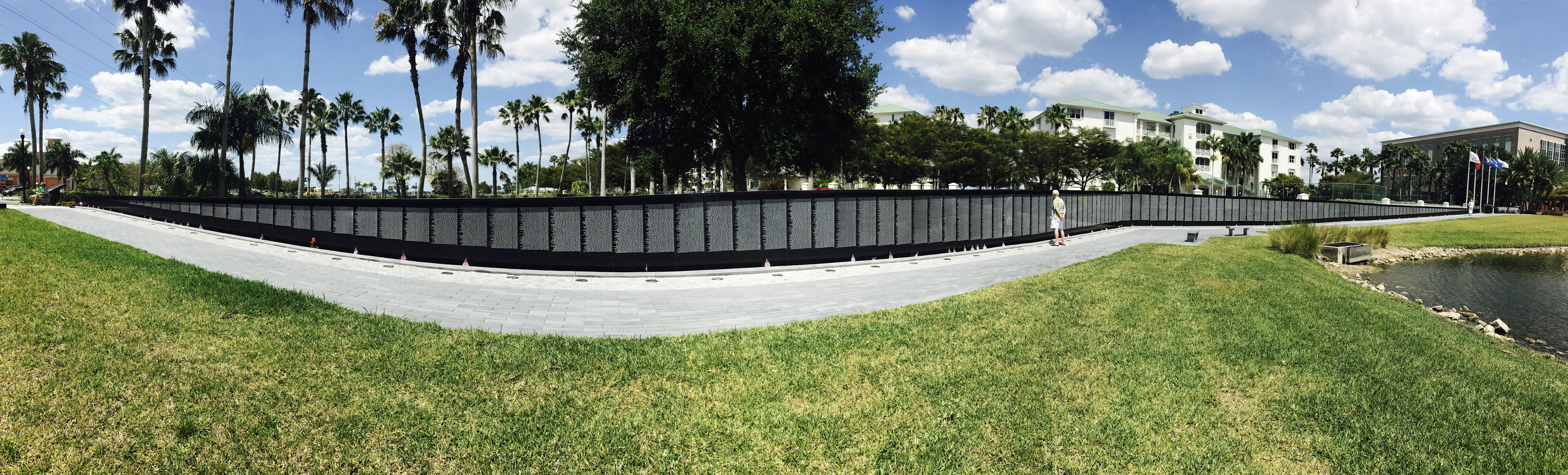
Veterans Memorial in Punta Gorda

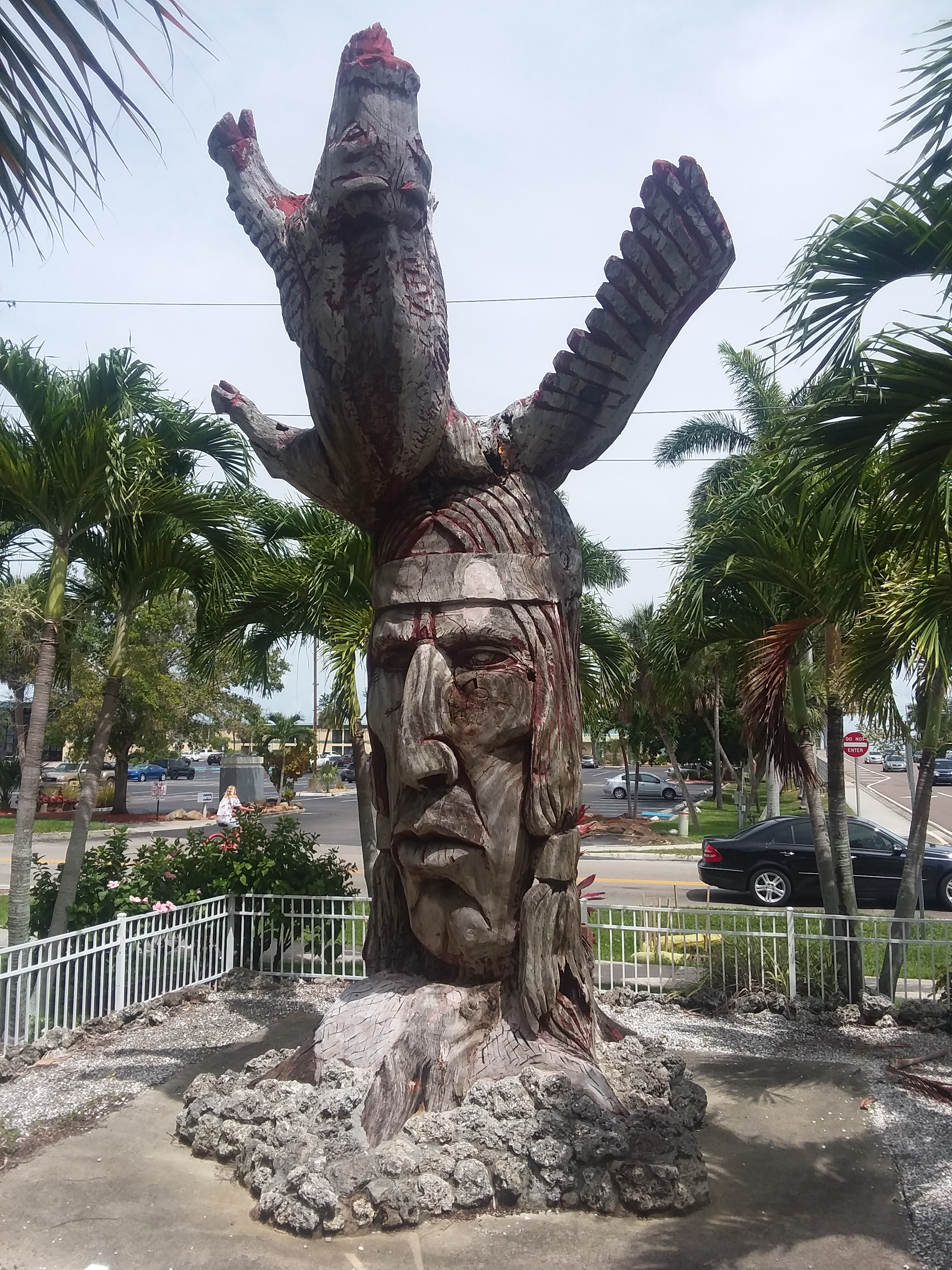
Calostimucu Whispering Giant statue at the A. C. Freeman House

In 2004, Category 4 Hurricane Charley moved through Punta Gorda, damaging many buildings, but also creating an opportunity for revitalization of both the historic downtown and the waterfront. During the first part of the 21st century, Punta Gorda continued to grow and improve, adding a new Harborwalk that continues to expand, a linear park that winds through the city, and many new restaurants and neighborhoods.

A replica of the Vietnam Veterans Memorial was dedicated on November 5, 2016. The city also features the Whispering Giant statue, a public art sculpture of the face of a Native American man and a Native American woman.

On September 28, 2022, Category 4 Hurricane Ian made landfall in Punta Gorda, resulting in severe damage throughout Florida. Coincidentally, the storm made landfall with the same wind speed (145 mph, 235 km/h) as Hurricane Charley, and its minimum barometric pressure was one millibar less than Charley's.

=== Historic sites ===
Many historic places are in Punta Gorda, including 10 on the National Register of Historic Places:

- A. C. Freeman House
- Charlotte High School
- Clarence L. Babcock House
- H. W. Smith Building
- Old First National Bank of Punta Gorda (also known as Old Merchants Bank of Punta Gorda)
- Punta Gorda Atlantic Coast Line Depot
- Punta Gorda Ice Plant
- Punta Gorda Residential District
- Punta Gorda Woman's Club
- Villa Bianca

== Geography ==
Punta Gorda lies on the south bank of the tidal Peace River and the eastern shore of Charlotte Harbor, an arm of the Gulf of Mexico. Unincorporated communities bordering Punta Gorda include Charlotte Park (nearly surrounded by the city), Solana to the east, and Charlotte Harbor to the north, across the Peace River. Port Charlotte is west of Punta Gorda's incorporated residential neighborhoods Deep Creek and Suncoast Lakes, north of the Peace River. Harbour Heights lies east of Punta Gorda's Deep Creek residential neighborhood.

According to the United States Census Bureau, the city has an area of 21.0 square miles (54.4 km^{2}), of which 15.0 square miles (38.9 km^{2}) are land and 6.0 square miles (15.5 km^{2}) (28.52%) are covered by water.

=== Climate ===
The climate is primarily humid subtropical (Köppen: Cfa/Cwa), narrowly falling short of the isotherm for a tropical savanna climate (Aw). It primarily has two seasons- a dry season (summer) and a wet season (winter). Certain areas slightly further south can be considered truly tropical.

Climate data for Punta Gorda, Florida (Punta Gorda Airport), 1991–2020 normals, extremes 1914–present
Month	Jan	Feb	Mar	Apr	May	Jun	Jul	Aug	Sep	Oct	Nov	Dec	Year
Record high °F (°C)	89 (32)	92 (33)	95 (35)	96 (36)	101 (38)	101 (38)	103 (39)	101 (38)	98 (37)	99 (37)	94 (34)	96 (36)	103 (39)
Mean maximum °F (°C)	84.1 (28.9)	85.9 (29.9)	88.0 (31.1)	91.2 (32.9)	94.7 (34.8)	96.0 (35.6)	95.6 (35.3)	95.6 (35.3)	94.2 (34.6)	91.6 (33.1)	87.9 (31.1)	85.4 (29.7)	97.0 (36.1)
Mean daily maximum °F (°C)	75.3 (24.1)	78.1 (25.6)	81.3 (27.4)	85.8 (29.9)	90.1 (32.3)	91.7 (33.2)	92.5 (33.6)	92.5 (33.6)	90.7 (32.6)	87.4 (30.8)	81.7 (27.6)	77.6 (25.3)	85.4 (29.7)
Daily mean °F (°C)	62.9 (17.2)	65.5 (18.6)	68.5 (20.3)	73.1 (22.8)	77.9 (25.5)	81.7 (27.6)	83.3 (28.5)	83.5 (28.6)	82.1 (27.8)	77.2 (25.1)	70.2 (21.2)	65.8 (18.8)	74.3 (23.5)
Mean daily minimum °F (°C)	50.5 (10.3)	53.0 (11.7)	55.7 (13.2)	60.5 (15.8)	65.6 (18.7)	71.8 (22.1)	74.1 (23.4)	74.5 (23.6)	73.4 (23.0)	66.9 (19.4)	58.8 (14.9)	54.1 (12.3)	63.2 (17.3)
Mean minimum °F (°C)	33.8 (1.0)	36.2 (2.3)	41.1 (5.1)	48.6 (9.2)	56.8 (13.8)	67.2 (19.6)	70.7 (21.5)	71.2 (21.8)	68.8 (20.4)	54.6 (12.6)	44.6 (7.0)	38.1 (3.4)	31.6 (−0.2)
Record low °F (°C)	23 (−5)	27 (−3)	29 (−2)	38 (3)	48 (9)	57 (14)	63 (17)	65 (18)	61 (16)	42 (6)	28 (−2)	22 (−6)	22 (−6)
Average precipitation inches (mm)	2.32 (59)	2.47 (63)	2.28 (58)	2.23 (57)	3.26 (83)	9.24 (235)	8.06 (205)	9.11 (231)	6.87 (174)	3.02 (77)	2.12 (54)	1.99 (51)	52.97 (1,345)
Average precipitation days (≥ 0.01 in)	9.3	7.6	7.6	6.9	8.7	17.0	18.9	19.5	15.5	8.8	7.2	9.3	136.3
Source 1: NOAA
Source 2: NWS Tampa Bay

=== Zoning ===
As of October 5, 2017, Punta Gorda has 11 zoning districts, five overlay districts, and three planned development districts. Of the zoning districts, six are designated for residential use, two for commercial use, and one for governmental use, and two districts allow mixed uses.

== Demographics ==
Historical population
Census	Pop.	Note	%±
1890	262		—
1900	860		228.2%
1910	1,012		17.7%
1920	1,295		28.0%
1930	1,833		41.5%
1940	1,889		3.1%
1950	1,915		1.4%
1960	3,157		64.9%
1970	3,879		22.9%
1980	6,797		75.2%
1990	10,747		58.1%
2000	14,344		33.5%
2010	16,641		16.0%
2020	19,471		17.0%
U.S. Decennial Census

=== Racial and ethnic composition ===
Punta Gorda racial composition (Hispanics excluded from racial categories) (NH = Non-Hispanic)
Race	Pop 2010	Pop 2020	% 2010	% 2020
White (NH)	14,972	17,113	89.97%	87.89%
Black or African American (NH)	523	504	3.14%	2.59%
Native American or Alaska Native (NH)	22	39	0.13%	0.20%
Asian (NH)	190	204	1.14%	1.05%
Pacific Islander or Native Hawaiian (NH)	2	4	0.01%	0.02%
Some other race (NH)	17	79	0.10%	0.41%
Two or more races/multiracial (NH)	169	480	1.02%	2.47%
Hispanic or Latino (any race)	746	1,048	4.48%	5.38%
Total	16,641	19,471		

=== 2020 census ===
As of the 2020 census, Punta Gorda had a population of 19,471. The median age was 67.6 years. 6.9% of residents were under the age of 18 and 56.8% of residents were 65 years of age or older. For every 100 females there were 90.7 males, and for every 100 females age 18 and over there were 89.6 males age 18 and over.

99.9% of residents lived in urban areas, while 0.1% lived in rural areas.

There were 10,135 households in Punta Gorda, of which 8.6% had children under the age of 18 living in them. Of all households, 57.4% were married-couple households, 14.1% were households with a male householder and no spouse or partner present, and 23.2% were households with a female householder and no spouse or partner present. About 29.3% of all households were made up of individuals and 20.8% had someone living alone who was 65 years of age or older.

There were 13,145 housing units, of which 22.9% were vacant. The homeowner vacancy rate was 2.5% and the rental vacancy rate was 15.0%.

Racial composition as of the 2020 census
Race	Number	Percent
White	17,336	89.0%
Black or African American	525	2.7%
American Indian and Alaska Native	41	0.2%
Asian	204	1.0%
Native Hawaiian and Other Pacific Islander	5	0.0%
Some other race	308	1.6%
Two or more races	1,052	5.4%
Hispanic or Latino (of any race)	1,048	5.4%

=== 2010 census ===
As of the 2010 United States census, 16,641 people, 8,134 households, and 5,798 families lived in the city.

== Education ==
Punta Gorda is home to five public schools operated by Charlotte County Public Schools: Charlotte High School, Punta Gorda Middle School, Sallie Jones Elementary School, East Elementary School, and the Baker Pre-K Center. Good Shepherd Day School is Punta Gorda's only private grade school. Florida SouthWestern Collegiate High School is a charter school.

Florida SouthWestern State College's Charlotte Campus is Punta Gorda's institution of higher learning.

== Libraries ==
The Punta Gorda Public Library in Punta Gorda is one of four branches in the Charlotte County Library System. It was established in 1908, making it the oldest branch of the Charlotte County Library System, which was created in 1963. The library was initially contained within an Episcopal Church rectory and supervised by the vicar's wife, Theodosia Trout, until 1909. The church that first housed this library still stands across the street, under the name Church of the Good Shepherd. The library was eventually moved due to its popularity interfering with church activities.

The Masonic Lodge on Sullivan Street became the library's new home due to its central location and popularity among established Punta Gorda groups and clubs, such as the Fortnightly Club and the Women's Civic Improvement Association. The library remained in the lodge until 1928, when a hurricane damaged part of the roof. Many books were destroyed, and the volumes that could be salvaged were moved to the new Women's Club building, where members adopted the library as a project. The library remained at the Women's Club building until land from the Retta Esplanade lot was donated for a new library in 1958.

In 1973, the City of Punta Gorda donated the land at 424 West Henry Street for a new library. This donation was intended for a playground, but with the permission of Mrs. Paschal B. Nobles, who donated the land, construction began for the new library.

On July 22, 1974, the Paschal B. Nobles-Punta Gorda Public Library opened to the public. The Punta Gorda Charlotte Library moved to a new, larger site on Shreve Street in 2019. The new library branch has features such as study niches, conference rooms, and an archive reading room.

== Transportation ==
U.S. Route 41, the Tamiami Trail, runs through the center of the city, leading south 23 miles (37 km) to Fort Myers and northwest 30 miles (48 km) to Venice. The southern terminus of U.S. Route 17 is in the center of Punta Gorda; the highway leads northeast 25 miles (40 km) to Arcadia and 1,206 miles (1,941 km) to its northern terminus in Winchester, Virginia. Interstate 75 bypasses Punta Gorda to the east, with access via U.S. 17 from Exit 164.

In 2010, over 90% of Punta Gorda commuters traveled by automobile, with about 81% driving alone and 9% carpooling. According to the 2015 American Community Survey, about 88% of Punta Gorda commuters traveled by automobile, with about 78% driving alone and 10% carpooling. About 6% worked out of the home, with about 6% of commuters traveling by all other modes of transportation.

The city last had intercity passenger rail with service by the Seaboard Coast Line Railroad on the Jacksonville-Fort Myers-Naples section of pre-Amtrak Champion.

Punta Gorda Airport has scheduled commercial service by Allegiant Air and seasonally by Sun Country Airlines.

== Notable people ==
- Mindi Abair, jazz saxophonist
- Charles Bailey, former U.S. Army Air Force officer and Tuskegee Airman
- Roy Boehm (1924–2008), founder of US Navy SEALS; died in Punta Gorda
- Amanda Carr, 2016 BMX Olympic competitor
- Daniel Conahan, serial killer
- Jeff Corsaletti, baseball player with the Portland Sea Dogs
- Ellen Dawson (1900–1967), Scottish-American trade union activist; died in Punta Gorda
- John Hall, NFL placekicker
- Matt LaPorta, Major League Baseball player
- Burton Lawless, NFL guard
- Tommy Murphy, MLB player
