= Gilchrist Bridge =

Bridge in Florida, United States of America

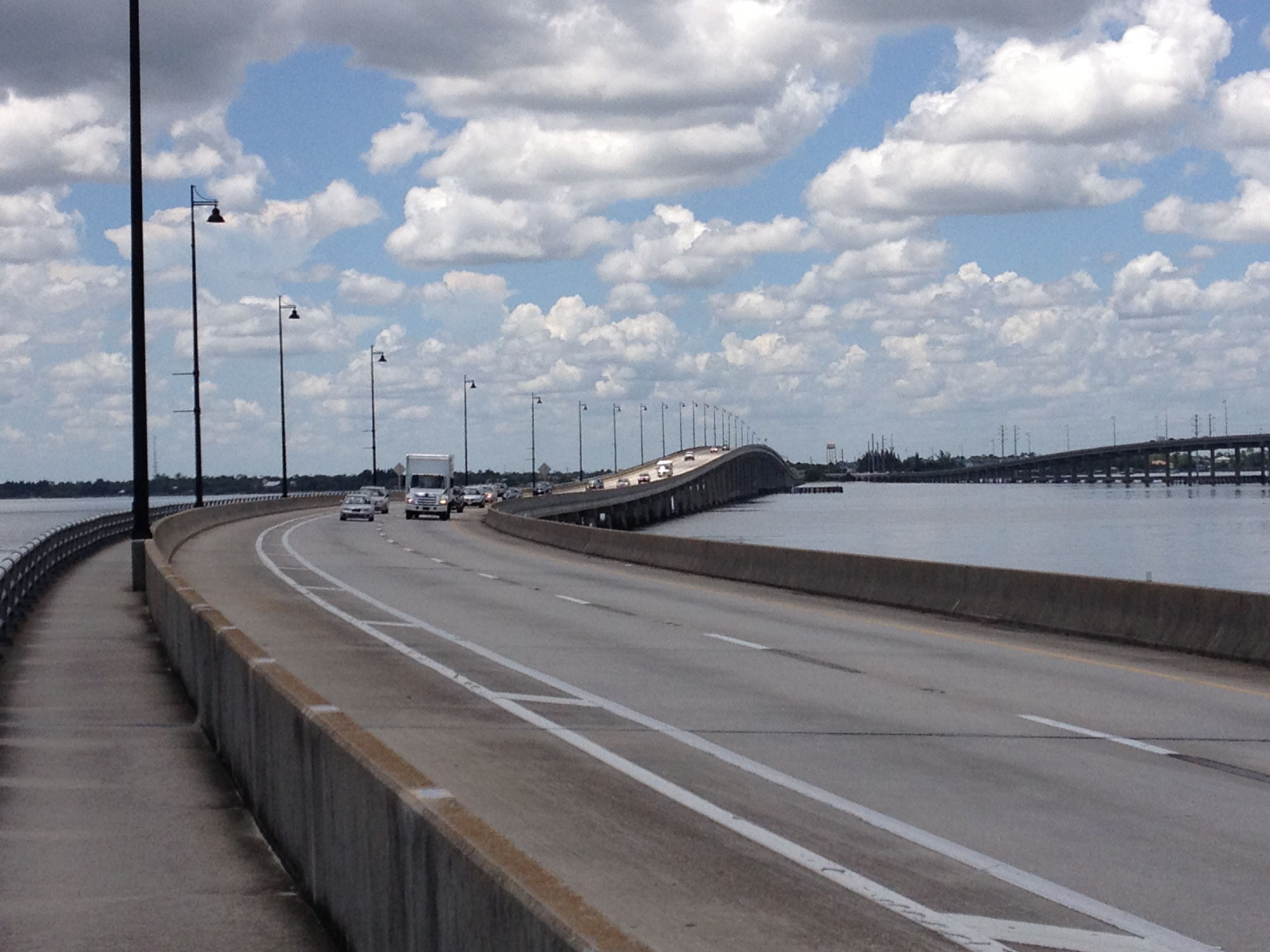
- Coordinates: 26.9448°N 82.0587°W
- Carries: US 41 south (Tamiami Trail)
- Crosses: Peace River
- Locale: Punta Gorda, Florida
- Maintained by: Florida Department of Transportation

Characteristics
- Design: Concrete girder bridge
- Clearance below: 45 feet (14 m)

History
- Opened: July 4, 1976

Location
- Interactive map of Gilchrist Bridge

The Albert W. Gilchrist Bridge is a bridge in Charlotte County, Florida, crossing the Peace River between Port Charlotte, Florida, and Punta Gorda, Florida. The two-lane 45-foot-tall structure carries the southbound lanes of U.S. Route 41 (Tamiami Trail). US 41's northbound lanes are carried over the river on the adjacent Barron Collier Bridge. It was named for former Florida Governor Albert W. Gilchrist, who resided in Punta Gorda.

== History ==
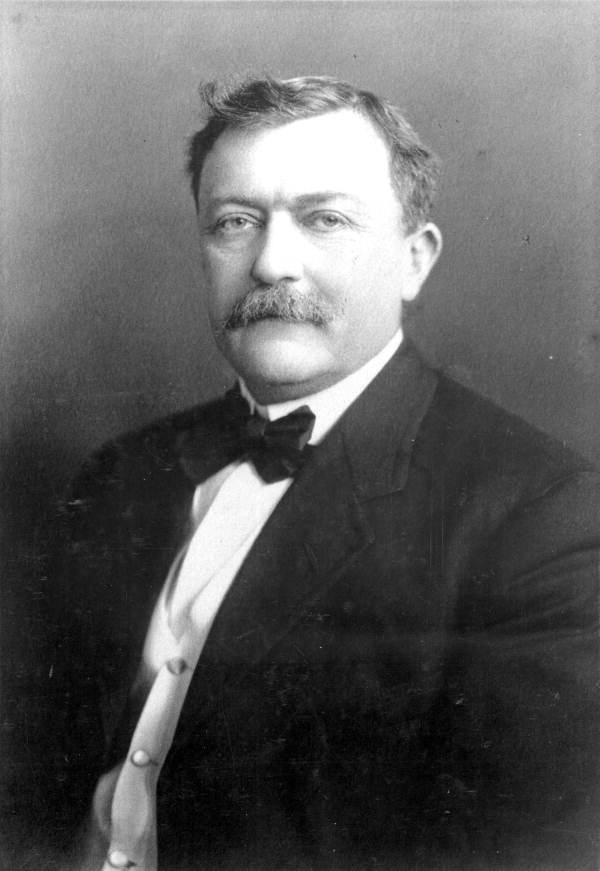
Albert W. Gilchrist, the bridge's namesake

The Gilchrist Bridge opened for traffic on July 4, 1976. It was built to make U.S. 41 a four lane highway over the Peace River.

When the Gilchrist Bridge opened, the original Barron Collier Bridge was still in service, which was a low-level drawbridge. It carried one lane in each direction prior to the Gilchrist Bridge's completion, and then carried two lanes of northbound traffic afterward. The Gilchrist Bridge lands at Cross Street in Punta Gorda, which was a couple of blocks west of King Street (where the Barron Collier Bridge lands). As a result, US 41 is carried on two one-way streets through Punta Gorda.

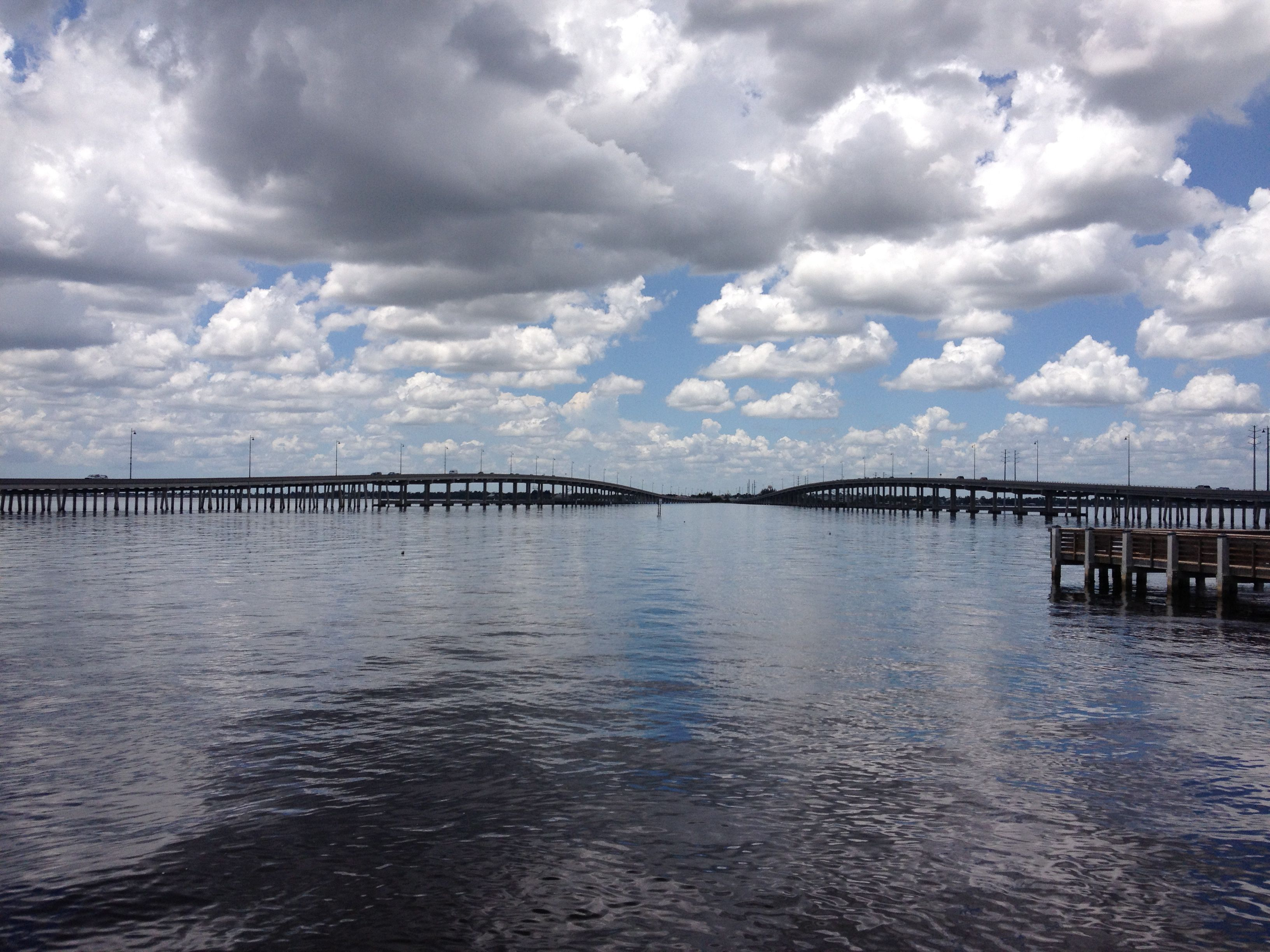
Barron Collier Bridge (right) and Gilchrist Bridge (left) as seen from Harborwalk in Punta Gorda

The current Barron Collier Bridge was then built in 1983, eliminating the need for the drawbridge which continued to disrupt northbound traffic. The current Barron Collier Bridge was built right next to the original, and is identical to the Gilchrist Bridge.

Albert W. Gilchrist was not the only name considered for the southbound bridge at the time of its construction. Naming the bridge after Juan Ponce de León was suggested at one point, as well as for Phil Laishley, a former Punta Gorda mayor. "Bicentennial Bridge" was another suggested name due to the bridge opening on July 4, 1976, the bicentennial anniversary of the United States. Ultimately, Gilchrist was selected to be the bridge's namesake since he is a significant figure in area's history.
