= Barron Collier Bridge =

Bridge in Florida, United States of America

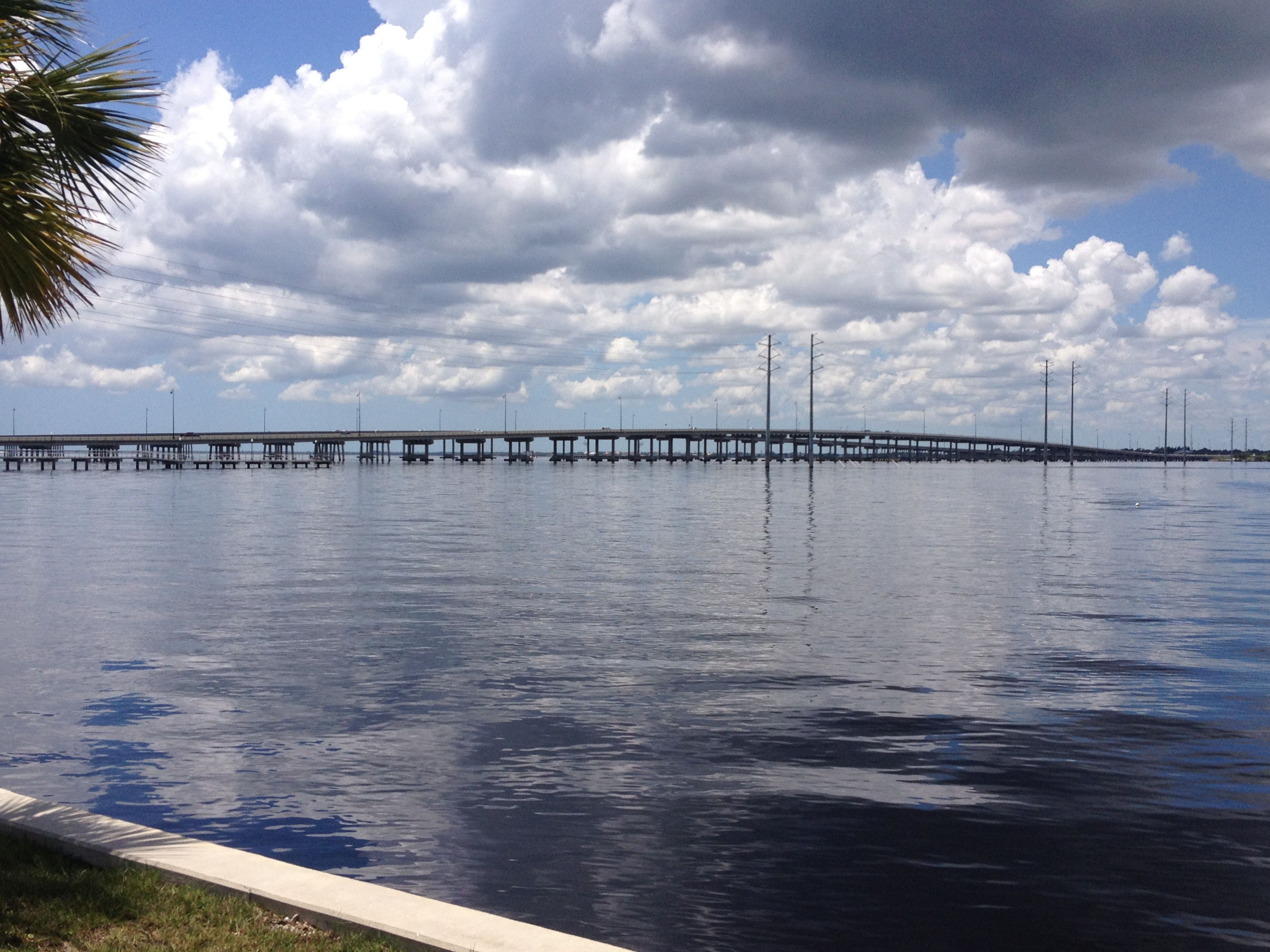
- Coordinates: 26.9451°N 82.0569°W
- Carries: US 41 north (Tamiami Trail)
- Crosses: Peace River
- Locale: Punta Gorda, Florida
- Maintained by: Florida Department of Transportation

Characteristics
- Design: Concrete Girder Bridge
- Clearance below: 45 Feet

History
- Opened: July 4, 1931 (original bridge); January 12, 1983 (current bridge)

Location
- Interactive map of Barron Collier Bridge

The Barron Collier Bridge is a bridge in Charlotte County, Florida that crosses the Peace River connecting Punta Gorda, Florida and Port Charlotte, Florida. It is 45 feet tall and carries two northbound lanes of U.S. Route 41 (Tamiami Trail). The southbound lanes cross the river on the adjacent Gilchrist Bridge. It was named for Barron G. Collier, a wealthy Southwest Florida land owner and entrepreneur.

== History ==
The first bridge built across the Peace River in Charlotte County was built in 1921 in anticipation of the construction of the Tamiami Trail and was known as the Charlotte Harbor Bridge. It was located just east of the Barron Collier Bridge, running from Live Oak Point on the north bank of the river to Nesbit Street in Punta Gorda (near where the Laishley Park fishing pier stands). The Charlotte Harbor Bridge became part of the Tamiami Trail, which was fully completed in 1928. After the trail was completed, it was determined that the Charlotte Harbor Bridge was insufficient for the needs of the Tamiami Trail because of poor construction and its lanes were too narrow.

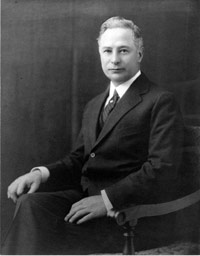
Barron G. Collier, the bridge's namesake

Barron G. Collier, who owned the Hotel Charlotte Harbor, was one of the main proponents of building a new bridge for the Tamiami Trail. Work began on the original Barron Collier Bridge in December 1929. The original Barron Collier Bridge was built a block east of the Charlotte Harbor Bridge at King Street (right next to Collier's hotel). The construction of the bridge necessitated the demolition of the Atlantic Coast Line Railroad’s dock at King Street, as well as its original passenger depot. The railroad built a new passenger depot on Taylor Road as a result, which still stands today.

The original Barron Collier Bridge opened for traffic on July 4, 1931. It included a drawbridge span for vessel traffic on the river. The old Charlotte Harbor Bridge was then closed to traffic, and its swing span over the navigation channel was removed. The sides were converted into fishing piers, which were demolished in the late 1970s.

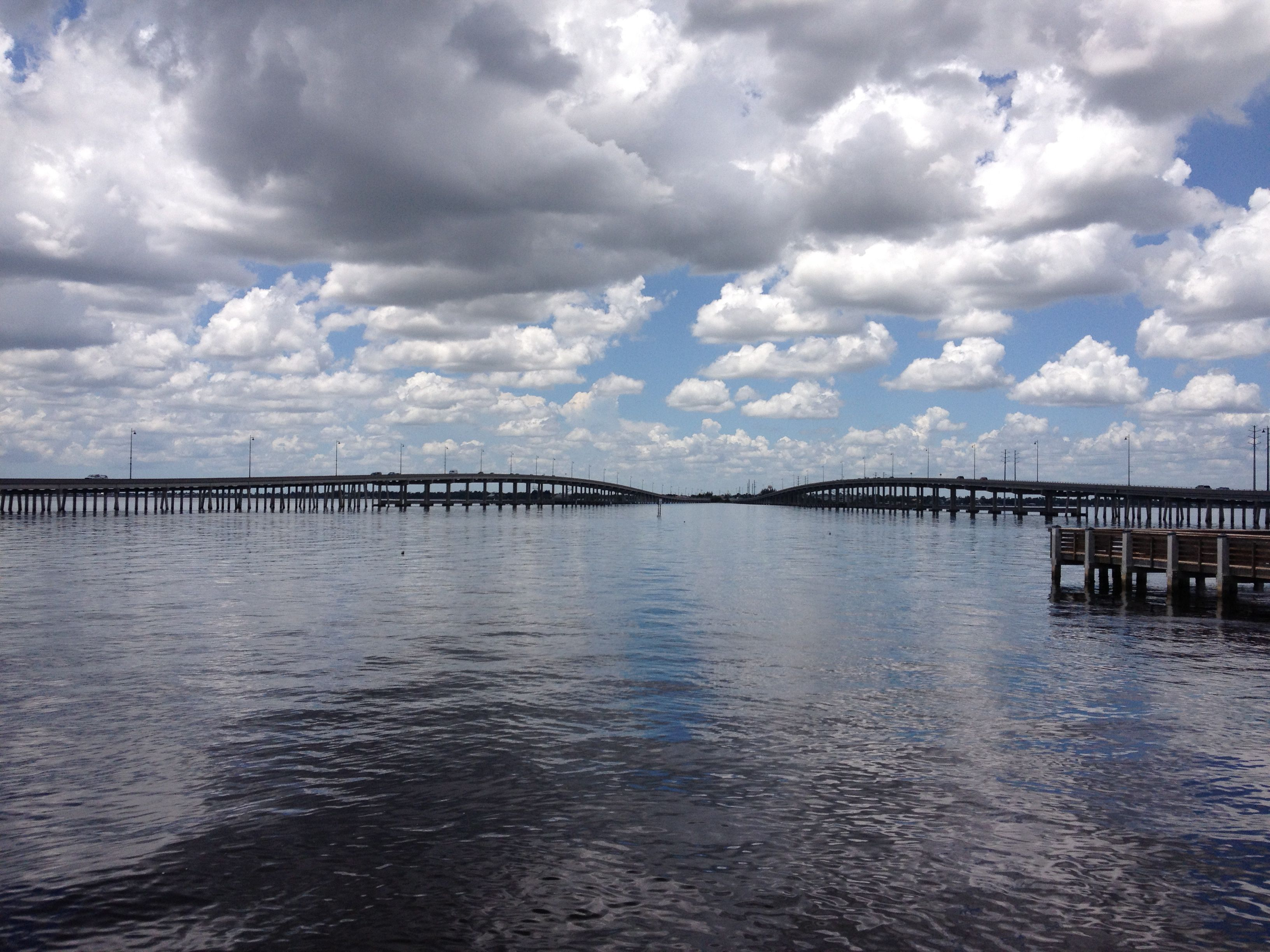
Barron Collier Bridge (right) and Gilchrist Bridge (left) as seen from Harborwalk in Punta Gorda

In 1976, the adjacent Gilchrist Bridge was opened to traffic. Southbound traffic was rerouted onto the Gilchrist Bridge, while both lanes on the Barron Collier Bridge carried northbound traffic. On January 12, 1983, the current Barron Collier Bridge was opened to traffic. It is 45 feet tall, eliminating the need for a drawbridge. It is essentially identical to the Gilchrist Bridge. The old Barron Collier Bridge was then demolished, and its remains were sunk into Charlotte Harbor for an artificial reef.
