= National Register of Historic Places listings in Charlotte County, Florida =

Location of Charlotte County in Florida

This is a list of the National Register of Historic Places listings in Charlotte County, Florida.

This is intended to be a complete list of the properties and districts on the National Register of Historic Places in Charlotte County, Florida, United States. The locations of National Register properties and districts for which the latitude and longitude coordinates are included below, may be seen in a map.

There are 17 properties and districts listed on the National Register in the county.

This National Park Service list is complete through NPS recent listings posted March 21, 2025.

Contents: Counties in Florida (non-linked contain no National Register listings)
Alachua - Baker - Bay - Bradford - Brevard - Broward - Calhoun - Charlotte - Citrus - Clay - Collier - Columbia - DeSoto - Dixie - Duval - Escambia - Flagler - Franklin - Gadsden - Gilchrist - Glades - Gulf - Hamilton - Hardee - Hendry - Hernando - Highlands - Hillsborough (Tampa) - Holmes - Indian River - Jackson - Jefferson - Lafayette - Lake - Lee - Leon - Levy - Liberty - Madison - Manatee - Marion - Martin - Miami-Dade (Miami) - Monroe - Nassau - Okaloosa - Okeechobee - Orange - Osceola - Palm Beach - Pasco - Pinellas - Polk - Putnam - St. Johns - St. Lucie - Santa Rosa - Sarasota - Seminole - Sumter - Suwannee - Taylor - Union - Volusia - Wakulla - Walton - Washington

== Current listings ==
	Name on the Register	Image	Date listed	Location	City or town	Description
1	Clarence L. Babcock House	Clarence L. Babcock House	February 25, 2009 (#09000053)	25537 Shore Drive; 26°56′56″N 82°01′35″W	Punta Gorda	
2	Big Mound Key-Boggess Ridge Archeological District		December 3, 1990 (#90001764)	Address Restricted	Placida	
3	Charlotte High School	Charlotte High School	December 12, 1990 (#90001796)	1250 Cooper Street; 26°55′36″N 82°02′21″W	Punta Gorda	Part of the Punta Gorda MPS
4	El Jobean Hotel	El Jobean Hotel	September 29, 1999 (#99001203)	4381 Garden Road; 26°57′50″N 82°12′46″W	El Jobean	
5	El Jobean Post Office and General Store	El Jobean Post Office and General Store	August 27, 1999 (#99001028)	4370 Garden Road; 26°57′51″N 82°12′43″W	El Jobean	
6	A. C. Freeman House	A. C. Freeman House	January 7, 1987 (#86003648)	639 East Hargreaves Avenue; 26°56′18″N 82°02′27″W	Punta Gorda	
7	Icing Station at Bull Bay		April 11, 1991 (#91000399)	Off Bull Key in Bull Bay; 26°46′20″N 82°12′18″W	Placida	Part of the Fish Cabins of Charlotte Harbor MPS
8	Mott Willis Store	Mott Willis Store	May 30, 1997 (#97000434)	22960 Bayshore Road; 26°57′29″N 82°04′31″W	Charlotte Harbor	Demolished in 1998
9	Old First National Bank of Punta Gorda	Old First National Bank of Punta Gorda	March 14, 1991 (#91000280)	133 West Marion Avenue; 26°56′06″N 82°03′02″W	Punta Gorda	Part of the Punta Gorda MPS
10	Punta Gorda Atlantic Coast Line Depot	Punta Gorda Atlantic Coast Line Depot	December 12, 1990 (#90001797)	1009 Taylor Road; 26°55′44″N 82°02′46″W	Punta Gorda	Part of the Punta Gorda MPS
11	Punta Gorda Ice Plant	Punta Gorda Ice Plant	December 12, 1990 (#90001798)	408 Tamiami Trail; 26°55′57″N 82°02′50″W	Punta Gorda	Part of the Punta Gorda MPS
12	Punta Gorda Residential District	Punta Gorda Residential District	January 7, 1991 (#90002103)	Roughly bounded by West Retta Esplanade, Berry Street, West Virginia Avenue and Taylor Street; 26°55′53″N 82°03′12″W	Punta Gorda	Part of the Punta Gorda MPS
13	Punta Gorda Woman's Club	Punta Gorda Woman's Club	April 5, 1991 (#91000382)	118 Sullivan Street; 26°56′06″N 82°03′08″W	Punta Gorda	Part of the Punta Gorda MPS
14	H. W. Smith Building	H. W. Smith Building	July 25, 1991 (#91000894)	121 East Marion Avenue; 26°56′09″N 82°02′57″W	Punta Gorda	Part of the Punta Gorda MPS
15	Villa Bianca	Villa Bianca	November 28, 1990 (#90001760)	2330 Shore Drive; 26°57′01″N 82°01′24″W	Punta Gorda	
16	West Coast Fish Company Residential Cabin at Bull Bay		April 11, 1991 (#91000401)	Bull Bay north of Bull Key; 26°46′33″N 82°12′14″W	Placida	Part of the Fish Cabins of Charlotte Harbor MPS
17	Willis Fish Cabin at Bull Bay	Willis Fish Cabin at Bull Bay	April 11, 1991 (#91000400)	Bull Bay north of Bull Key; 26°46′28″N 82°12′29″W	Placida	Part of the Fish Cabins of Charlotte Harbor MPS

== See also ==
- List of National Historic Landmarks in Florida
- National Register of Historic Places listings in Florida
