= Punta Gorda Fish Co. =

American fishing company

Punta Gorda Fish Co. was a fishing company established in the late 19th century in Punta Gorda, Florida. At least ten of the fish shacks and icehouses built by the company have been listed on the National Register of Historic Places.

== Company history ==
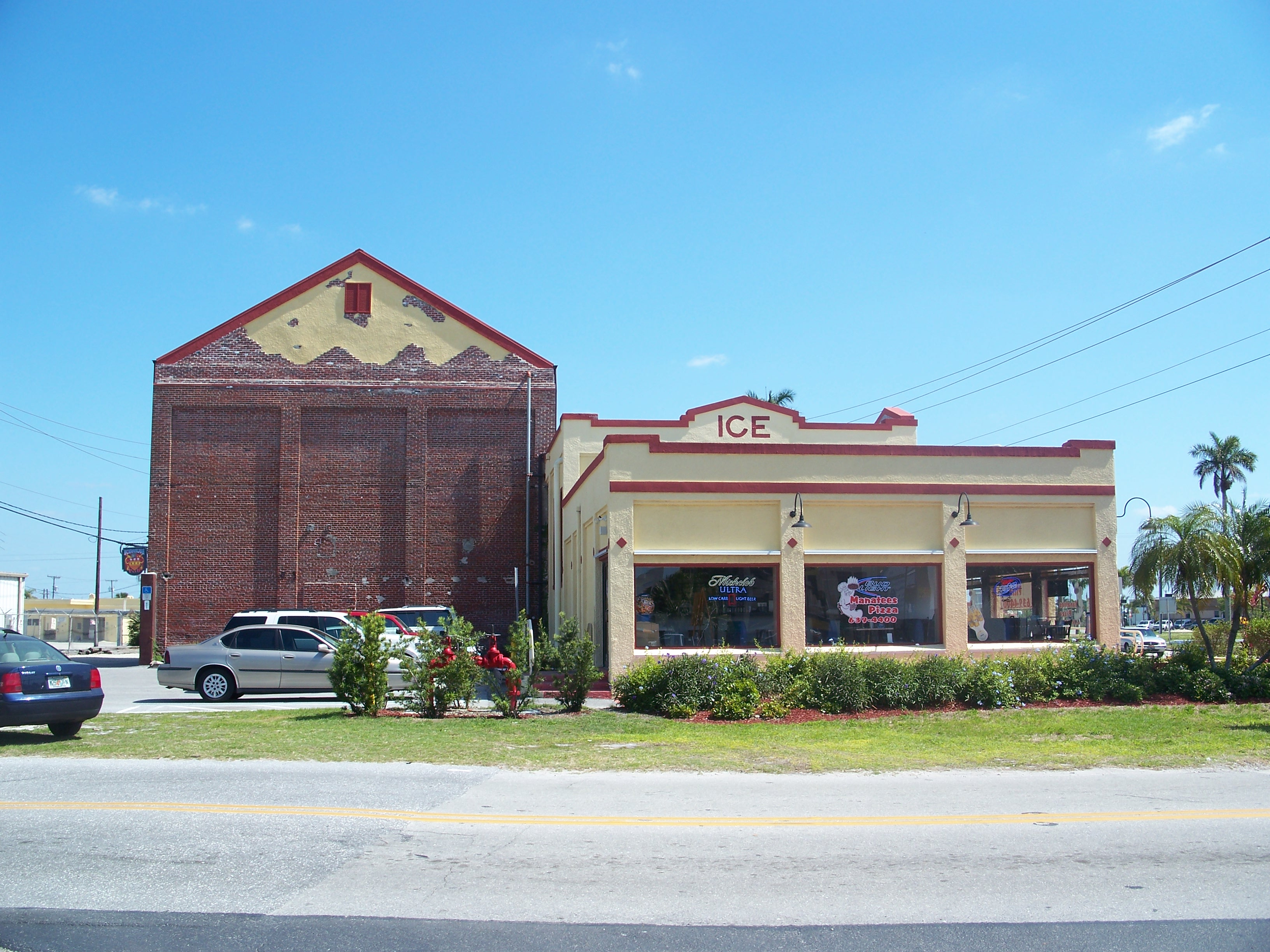
Punta Gorda Ice Plant

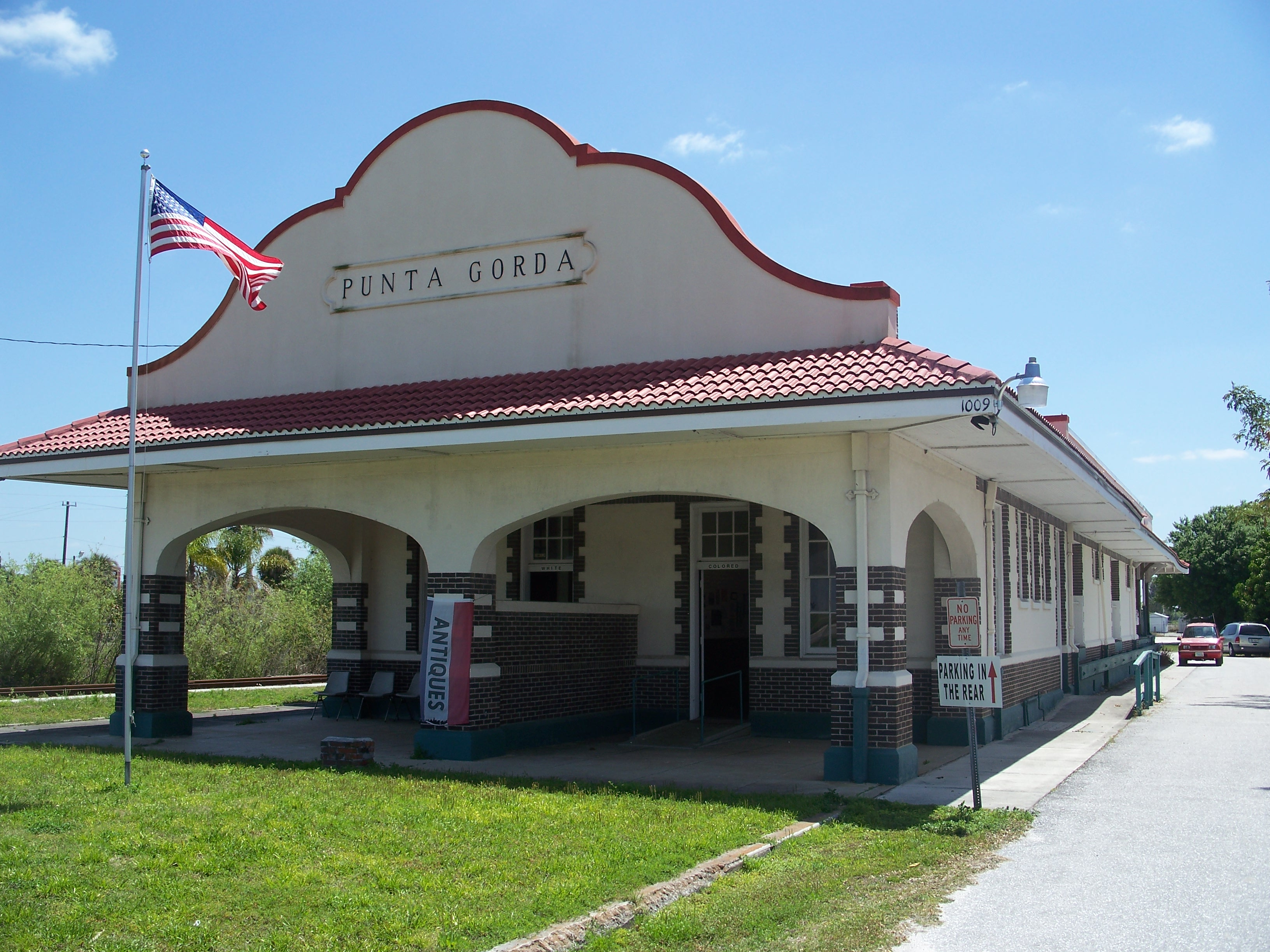
Punta Gorda depot

In the 1890s, with the construction of a large ice plant and the extension of the Florida Southern Railroad, the port at Punta Gorda, Florida, became a center for southwest Florida's commercial fishing industry. The Punta Gorda Fish Company was established in 1897 by Eugene Knight and Harry Dreggors and became one of the largest commercial operators in Punta Gorda. The company had certain areas designated as its fishing territory. It built a network of ice houses and residential fish cabins throughout Charlotte Harbor, Pine Island, and the Pine Island Sound. The fish cabins were widely used until World War II and allowed fisherman to work longer shifts without returning to port for shelter, food and supplies. The crew of a fishing boat would sleep in the fish cabins and deliver their catch to the ice houses, where the company's ice keepers would weigh the fish and provide fishermen with receipts that could be cashed at the company's office. The company's "run" boats delivered ice, mail and supplies to the fish cabins and ice houses, returning to the company's dock in Punta Gorda with the fresh fish.

By 1897, the company employed 230 persons on its offshore fisheries and operated 140 boats. In 1927, the Pine Island Causeway linked Pine Island to the mainland, reducing the need for runboats. The demand for the area's fresh fish declined during the Great Depression, and the area's fishing industry declined further when a fire destroyed Punta Gorda's major fishing dock in 1939. The Punta Gorda Fish Company was one of the few companies to survive the fire and acquired some of the fish cabins previously operated by its competitors. As roads and bridges were improved after World War II, the company increasingly used refrigerated trucks to collect the area's catch, and the need for fish shacks and icehouses declined. The company thereafter sold many of its fishing cabins, which were then used for private sport fishing, as "crash pads by recreational anglers," or converted into vacation cabins.

The company continued to operate until 1977.

== Registered historic sites ==
In the 1980s, Florida's Department of Natural Resources concluded that the old fish shacks, which lacked plumbing and sanitation, were navigation hazards and a threat to sea grasses. The state began burning the fish shacks in the mid-1980s until locals began to advocate for the preservation of the structures. In 1991, the preservationists succeeded in having a number of the structures designated as historic sites.

At least ten of the company's surviving structures, seven fish cabins and three ice houses, have been listed on the National Register of Historic Places. The cabins and ice houses are "frame vernacular cabins set on wood pilings" and were all built on submerged land between approximately 1920 and 1941. Most of these locations were added to the National Register pursuant to a 1991 Multiple Property Submission titled the "Fish Cabins of Charlotte Harbor." The Multiple Property Submission cited the cabins' significance in the development of southwest Florida's commercial fishing industry, and "their architecture, materials, and workmanship" as examples of distinctive and functional architecture. In a 2008 feature story on the area's historic fish shacks, The News-Press wrote:

Commercial fishermen ... lived months at a time in simple one-story wood-frame cabins on pilings in Pine Island Sound and Charlotte Harbor. They had no electricity, no plumbing, no telephone. Rain gutters collected water they rationed. ... The fish cabins ... are the legacy of a thriving industry that worked Charlotte Harbor waters before World War II. Fishermen netted fish by hand and stored their catch in the fish companies' ice houses, where boats picked up the harvest and carried it to Punta Gorda.

The registered structures include:

- Fish Cabin at White Rock Shoals (c. 1920-1941), west of Pine Island, Pine Island Sound, St. James City, Florida, NRHP-listed26°32′41″N 82°7′19″W
- Hendrickson Fish Cabin at Captiva Rocks (before 1930), west of Little Wood Key, Pine Island Sound, Bokeelia, Florida, NRHP-listed 26°37′42″N 82°11′29″W
- Ice House at Captiva Rocks(built before 1930), southwest of Little Wood Key, Pine Island Sound, Bokeelia, Florida, NRHP-listed26°37′35″N 82°11′7″W
- Ice House at Point Blanco (before 1930), southeast of Point Blanco Island, Pine Island Sound, Bokeelia, Florida, NRHP-listed26°40′30″N 82°13′31″W
- Larsen Fish Cabin at Captiva Rocks (c. 1920), west of Little Wood Key, Pine Island Sound, Bokeelia, Florida, NRHP-listed 26°37′46″N 82°11′29″W
- Leneer Fish Cabin at Captiva Rocks (c. 1920), west of Little Wood Key, Pine Island Sound, Bokeelia, Florida, NRHP-listed26°37′38″N 82°11′25″W
- Norton Fish Cabin at Captiva Rocks (c. 1920), west of Little Wood Key, Pine Island Sound, Bokeelia, Florida, NRHP-listed26°37′47″N 82°11′32″W
- Punta Gorda Fish Company Ice House (1924), N shore of entrance to Safety Harbor, North Captiva Island, Florida, NRHP-listed on April 20, 198926°35′56″N 82°12′49″W
- Punta Gorda Fish Company Cabin, also known as McQueen or Cole or Hendry Fish Cabin, Pine Island Sound, Bokeelia, Florida, NRHP-listed in 200326°37′41″N 82°11′26″W
- Whidden Fish Cabin at Captiva Rocks, west of Little Wood Key, Pine Island Sound, Bokeelia, Florida, NRHP-listed26°37′35″N 82°11′24″W

== See also ==
- Punta Gorda Ice Plant, 408 Tamiami Trail, Punta Gorda, Florida, NRHP-listed
- List of historic Fish Cabins of Charlotte Harbor, Florida
