= Cayo Pelau Archaeological Site =

Aboriginal archaeological site in Florida, US

Cayo Pelau Archaeological Site is a multi-period aboriginal archaeological site in Charlotte Harbor on the west peninsular Gulf coast of the United States. The island is 3.5 miles directly south of the Big Mound Key-Boggess Ridge Archeological District. It is the only site that lies within two counties, Lee County in the south and Charlotte County, Florida to the north.

Lee County acquired approximately 126 acres through Conservation 20/20 in February 2007. The plan identifies archaeological resource protection among its management activities.

It is known from the literature that the site consists of a large sand burial mound and a midden. Based on the ceramics taken from the midden, the burial mound and midden date from 800 BC - 500 BC, the Glades I Period, due to the Orange ceramics and early Glades and St. Johns ceramics found there. Several Calusa metal tablets, one silver and one copper, examples of 16th-century post-colonial artifacts, were extracted from the site. Use of the site into the early 19th century has been recorded, including use as a fishing camp by Cuban fishermen.

According to archaeologist Jeffrey McClain Mitchem, the burial mound and midden have been excavated by numerous persons, beginning with prominent Florida looter Montague Tallant, who donated some of his finds to the Florida Museum of Natural History.

Gordon R. Willey gives a concise account of the site in his Archaeology of the Gulf Coast Florida for the Smithsonian Institution. Prior to his research, the burial mound was 27.4 m by 1.8 - 2.5 m high and contained both Glades Plain and Weeden Island pottery. In the 1950s the shell midden was excavated by John Goggin and William Plowden. They dated the midden to be much later, 800 AD - 1000 AD.
