= Protection of Native American sites in Florida =

The State of Florida, the United States Federal government, local governments, and Indigenous tribal governments have particular interests in the protection and preservation of Native American cultural, historic, and sacred sites in Florida. Over the years, Florida has faced threats to its indigenous sites from development, looters using bulldozers and heavy machinery, and various environmental factors such as hogs and erosion. In recent years, the protection of indigenous sites has become a focus in Florida.

In the 1960s, the advent of scuba diving led to a wave of underwater explorers who quickly realized that Florida's riverbeds were covered with remains of prehistoric megafauna and paleoindian artifacts. A collaborative relationship was quickly forged between this group and the Florida Museum of Natural History. Notable divers from this time period include Ben Waller, Hub Chasom, Clarence Simpson, Don Serbousek, and many others. Without the contributions of knowledge, artifacts, and sites by these and many other amateur archaeologists, professional archaeologists would have struggled to unlock the door to Florida's past. The late, esteemed archaeologist Dr. Barbara Purdy wrote in 2005, "We wouldn't know zilch without the contributions of river divers and avocational archaeologists."

In 1983, retired US Navy Seal and recreational diver Buddy Page led paleontologist S. David Webb (then with the Florida Museum of Natural History at the University of Florida) and archaeologist James M. Dunbar (then with the Florida Bureau of Archaeological Research) to a deep underwater sinkhole site he discovered in the Aucilla River that he believed was scientifically significant (now called the Page-Ladson site).

A test pit at the site confirmed that it contained not only vertebrate fossils, but also evidence of Paleoindian occupation. A project called the "Aucilla River Prehistory Project" was born out of this survey, which ran from 1983 until 1997. This project was led by Dr. Webb and Dr. Dunbar as a collaborative effort between their agencies, amateur river divers and other members of the public. This site became ground zero as far as searching for the secrets to North America's first peoples and is currently dated to around 14,500 years old.

Between 1996 and 2005 the Isolated Finds Program was in place which allowed amateur archaeologists to continue contributing to the archaeological record without fear of violating the newly adopted 1993 Florida Statutes which increased penalties for looting. The suspension of the program led to decreased participation and reporting of new sites and is widely viewed as the beginning of a great rift in the amateur/professional relationship that has only continued to grow over the last two decades.

In 2016, amateur archaeologists introduced bills in both the Senate and the House of Representatives that sought to mend the rift between professionals and amateurs. Although these bills were controversial at the time and failed, they nevertheless brought increased attention to the importance of bridging the gap between amateurs and professionals in order to work together towards the discovery & protection of Native American sites.

The Florida Fish and Wildlife Conservation Commission, has been largely tasked with protecting Native American sites from criminals using bulldozers to loot and destroy archaeological sites.

== Threats from invasive species ==
The invasive feral hog was introduced to Florida first in 1539 by the Spanish explorer Hernando de Soto. Aside from harboring diseases, killing native plant and animal species, and destroying crops, feral hogs are also a significant threat to indigenous sites in Florida. Feral hogs often root as deep as 20 centimeters in the soft Florida soil with some examples of rooting up to 45 centimeters in Florida. A study on feral hog rooting that involved 293 archaeological sites in Florida found that 90% of the sites had artifacts within the first 20 centimeters of the soil and 85% of sites had artifacts within the first 10 centimeters of the soil, making these sites especially vulnerable to feral hog disturbance. The study gave a conservative estimate that 42% of the sites experienced feral hog disturbance during the time period of study. The study also found that after 18 months the damage from feral hogs was impossible to detect, which would lead archaeologists to believe that the sites had not been disturbed.

== Threats from looting ==
The archaeological sites of Florida's indigenous peoples have been disturbed and looted since the arrival of Europeans, however, recent changes have increased the scope and destructiveness of the problem. In the late 1970s looting of sites on state owned lands increased dramatically and spread across the state from the Tampa Bay area north towards the St. Marks River. Entering the 1980s, looting was still on the rise and the market value of illegal artifacts was as well. Looters are generally looking for pottery and stone tools, which they can then sell on the black market.

Looters have used a variety of methods to excavate artifacts, ranging from shovels to bulldozers. In 1978, looters near Charlotte Harbor drove a bulldozer across state lands, down an Indian ridge, through the mangroves and out to Big Mound Key. Once on the 13.5-acre site, the looters opened up a 15-foot trench through the mound, apparently in the hope of finding the hidden treasure cache of the mythical pirate Jose Gaspar, a fictional figure from Florida folklore. The resulting gash in the mound is still visible decades later, and news coverage of the damage caused by "looters in search of a non-pirate's non-treasure" helped spur the passage of state laws to protect such sites. Likewise, in 2022, a Marion county employee used a county-owned bulldozer to dig through an area on county land in search of artifacts, although this was not a recognized site.

Looting remains a major concern among archaeologists, as it is difficult and expensive for the state to reliably protect these sites from people using large machinery to excavate.

== Operation Timucua (2013) ==
There are too many archaeological sites in Florida for law enforcement agencies to be able to monitor them and catch looters while they are digging. Carried out by the Florida Fish and Wildlife Conservation Commission (FWC), Operation Timucua was a two-year undercover operation that culminated in raids of 14 individuals' homes during the early hours of February 27, 2013. The raids focused primarily on small artifact business owners, many of whom had made significant contributions to Florida's understanding of its prehistory during the Isolated Finds Program. The stated impetus for Operation Timucua, was to target looters, however, although over 400 felony charges were initially filed against the individuals, no felony convictions were obtained and several individuals saw their charges dropped entirely due to lack of evidence. The operation initially resulted in the seizure of two million dollars' worth of artifacts, however, many were from old or inherited collections and private land, which following a lack of evidence, many of the artifacts were returned to the owners.

Aftermath

Although Operation Timucua has been touted as a success by some, the effects were quite damaging to the professional/amateur relationship that was so pivotal in the 1960s-1990s for discovering information about Florida's first inhabitants.

During an interrogation, one of those arrested reported to his friend, William Barton, that he had been shown his picture by FWC. Paranoid that he would also be targeted by FWC, William Barton took his own life. Another of those arrested suffered a divorce as a result of the raid, and several suffered great financial setbacks. Many wives were also reportedly put in handcuffs during the midnight raid, which FWC also denies.

The operation as a whole cost taxpayers over $200,000, but only netted a handful of no contest pleas and no jail or prison time for any of those arrested.

These actions led to the amateur community further developing a great mistrust of FWC and the professional archaeological community as many of those arrested were known contributors to the greater scientific body.

In 2016, Dr. Purdy recapped her perspective on the raids as a professional archaeologist:

"There is probably nothing that saddens an archaeologist more than to learn that an archaeological site of great scientific potential has been wantonly ravaged by individuals seeking one or two recognizable artifacts that might be sold to the highest bidder leaving all manner of other valuable information lying out of context on the surface.

Archaeologists sit on the highest fence looking at one side and the other. On one side, they see the situation described above. Looking down on the other side, they find individuals who eagerly seek the advice and cooperation of archaeologists. Gradually, some of those on Side 1 move over to Side 2. This will not happen when there is a lack of trust and when a situation occurs such as in 2013 when, without warning of any kind, members of the Florida Fish and Wildlife Conservation Commission's Division of Law Enforcement made criminals out of our citizens by showing up at the homes of various individuals and demanding to see their artifact collections."

== SB 1225 / HB 512 (1988) ==
In 1988 Senator Johnson and Representative Thomas introduced a bill to the Florida legislature that would have prohibited the export of artifacts from archaeological sites within Florida, except pursuant to a permit issued by the Division of Historical Resources of the Department of State. This bill went so far as to include provisions to prohibit sale of artifacts found on private property with the penalty under the bill including that "any person who willfully and knowingly exports an artifact from a Florida archaeological site without a permit from the division shall be assessed an administrative penalty of $10,000."

Although the bill eventually died, many other bills since have also attempted to regulate artifacts held by the general public or their ability to collect them. These attempts have always been quite controversial, gained little traction, and been regarded as a ploy by the state to encroach on the rights of its citizens.

In 2018 during questioning on HB 6041 which sought to limit public involvement in archaeology, in response to a question from Representative Matt Willhite regarding state interference with private property archaeological rights, Representative Cyndi Stevenson stated that "The state of Florida has never had a law that interfered with private property rights in regards to archaeological finds and they are entitled to do with them or allow exploration as they desire." Although her statement was technically true, had SB1225 passed 30 years prior, private rights would have in fact been greatly restricted by the State of Florida.

== Shearer v. State (2000) ==
In 1997, in Jefferson County, a woman named M. Shearer was arrested and subsequently convicted on a felony charge of excavating an archaeological site - a violation of Florida Statute Chapter 267. Three years later a three judge panel in Florida's 1st District Circuit Court of Appeals overturned her conviction ruling that "acting willfully and knowingly is an element of the crime of unlawful excavation of an archaeological site without a permit" and that the judge in the first trial had failed to indicate to the jury that proving mens rea (knowledge of committing a crime) is necessary for returning a Chapter 267 conviction. This case is an important piece of case law as it means that someone who accidentally disturbs an archaeological site is not guilty under Florida law.

== Isolated Finds Program (1996-2005) ==
The Isolated Finds Program, sometimes referred to as the Isolated Finds Policy, was implemented by Florida's Department of Historic Resources in June 1996 and suspended June 1, 2005. In 1993, the Florida Legislature adopted language in F.S. 267.13 that made removing an artifact from state land a felony. As a result, several divers who were major contributors to the State's archaeological repository approached then State Archaeologist, Jim Miller, stating that this law had turned them into felons for doing what they always had (reporting artifacts to the state). The Isolated Finds Program established as a way for private citizens to legally collect archaeological artifacts and report them to the state. In order to be legally collected, the artifacts had to be on submerged state lands such as river bottoms and displaced from their original context. Isolated artifacts on submerged lands are those that have been removed from their context and original place of deposition which means they have lost much of their historical and cultural significance. Some have argued that rivers in Florida are generally slow moving and are composed of fill sediments that make isolated artifacts less likely to occur, however, it has been shown that Florida's yearly flood stages routinely wash sediments downstream in a large marl of beer cans, gravel, fossils, and artifacts.

Over the years many misconceptions regarding the program have arisen, and although there were several administrative oversights that contributed to difficulties with administering the program, the IFP did see significant contributions to the archaeological record. Of special note is the paleoindian Ryan-Harley site on the lower Wacissa river which was discovered by brothers and amateur archaeologists Harley and Ryan Means in the late 1990s. In 2016, Dr. Barbara Purdy wrote that under the IFP's administration over 1,115 reports to the Division of Historical Resources reported over 10,700 artifacts. Sometimes this number is reported as much lower by opponents of the program to make it appear problematic.

It is likely that the number of artifacts reported would have been much higher if not for unforeseen problems in the creation of the IFP. These problems included a lack of funding from DHR to support the program, no actual permit being issued (honor system), no outreach by DHR (due to no funding for the program), and the need for the finder to print photos of the artifacts and file their reports within 30 days of discovery which during the late 1990s and early 2000s was quite time-consuming and not easily accessible by all.

Because of these problems, in their May 2005 meeting, Florida Historical Commission member Lex McKeithen made a motion to recommend the suspension of the Isolated Finds Program. This motion passed unanimously, however, Commissioner McKeithen immediately afterwards initiated discussion on what the replacement program should look like and the need for legislative funding and support. Likewise, Commissioner Little commented that the Florida Historical Commission convey that it is not opposed to a more workable policy.

Following the discontinuation of the Isolated Finds Programs, amateur archaeologists have felt largely sidelined and criminalized by the professional archaeological community (just as in 1993 which led to the creation of the IFP). This has led to a great divide between the groups with mistrust on both sides and has in turn led to less sites being reported. Since 2005 groups have lobbied for bills that would bring back the program with the Citizen Archaeology Permit bills of 2016 being the most notable.

== Citizen Archaeology Permit (2016) ==
The Citizen Archaeology Permit or CAP was proposed by 2016 House Bill 803 and 2016 Senate Bill 1054. The CAP program was an attempt to fix the problems inherent within Florida's previous Isolated Finds Program of 1996–2005 and fix the amateur/professional relationship. The bills directed Florida's Department of Historical Resources to implement a replacement program for divers to again legally discover and report isolated artifacts in rivers. Citizens with the $100 permit would be allowed to remove artifacts from submerged lands owned by the state (mostly rivers) as long as they were isolated and not in their original context. Permit holders would be required to document the location and the artifact through photographs and other means then submit the information to the state. The intent of the bills was that citizens would be able to recover artifacts already dislodged from their original context through the process of erosion and tumbling down the river, thus saving them from being destroyed by natural processes. A notable example of one such discovery was in 2007 when a citizen recovered an incised fossilized bone that depicted a man hunting a mammoth. This bone was recovered from a dredge spoil pile left by the U.S. Army Corp and had no other archaeological context, but was nonetheless a major contribution to science. The recovery of the artifact was technically illegal at the time, but the dilemma would be to take the artifact illegally and report it to the state, or leave it to be destroyed by the elements. These bills would have made it legal to collect and report artifacts.

Opponents of the bills argued before the legislative committees that the permit would result in artifacts entering private collections never to be seen again, however the permit would have given the state first right of refusal and the days associated with such artifacts even if the state elected not to claim ownership. Further arguments by certain opponents claimed the permit would allow for excavation of burial sites and the taking of human remains, although these arguments failed to take into consideration that the permit only allowed for artifacts without context to be recovered and disturbance of human remains is already a felony under F.S. 872.05.

One provision in the bill would have given permit holders a map of site locations with protection of sites being the goal. However, disclosure of this information could have contradicted current law that exempts archaeological sites from public records in order to preserve their cultural and historical value from looting and other destructive behavior.

Ultimately both bills died in committee mainly due to a lack of cooperation between professionals and amateurs to develop a bill that would have satisfied both interested parties.

In the months before the bills were filed, in 2015, at the Aucilla Research Institute's First Floridian's Conference, amateur archaeologist Ryan Means raised the topic of bridging the divide between amateur and professional archaeologists through a new Isolated Finds Program to the panel of speakers. Although several archaeologists on the panel agreed that a replacement program may very well be necessary, certain archaeologists were quite vocal in their opposition to working with amateurs and ultimately many archaeologists did not participate in the crafting of the bills which led to their controversial nature and failure.

== Problems for site discovery and protection in Florida ==
Despite Florida's long history of indigenous and European occupation, the first professional archaeology in south Florida was not conducted until 1869 by Jeffries Wyman of Harvard's Peabody Museum. Prior to 1910, there was no comprehensive law that protected cultural and natural resources until the Antiquities Act of 1906. Over the years, there have also been longstanding issues of the lack of funding and enforcement related to excavation of archaeological sites. Many local governments do not have the resources to enforce existing laws and local governments are also inconsistent in their enforcement of the laws. Florida has a long and continuing history of rapid development, which is often in conflict with the protection and preservation of archaeological sites. In the past 65 years, Florida's population has risen from 5 million to 22.95 million, which increases the need for funds for cultural and historic resources. One major issue facing those who seek to find, excavate, and preserve new sites in modern times is the lack of public interest in the subject. Many residents do not understand the cultural and historic significance of local indigenous sites because there is little visible surface evidence of occupation. Advances in technology such as scuba equipment that became widely available in 1968 have the potential to radically change the way we learn about and preserve our past, provided professionals can find a way to restore the relationship with the amateur archaeologist & dive community. This option is especially desirable due to the ever increasing cost of putting an entire archaeological dive team out on the river.

== Laws related to archaeological site protection ==
The following is a list of legislation and codes with brief descriptions related to the protection of archaeological sites in Florida.

=== Seminole Tribe of Florida's Cultural Resource Ordinance, 2013 ===
Seminole Tribe of Florida's Cultural Resource Ordinance or CRO was adopted by the tribal council in 2013 and approved by the Advisory Council on Historic Preservation in 2016. This ordinance allows the tribe to take control of all cultural resources within reservation lands.

=== The Antiquities Act of 1906 ===
The Antiquities Act of 1906 was the first federal law that provided protection for cultural and historic resources.

=== The National Historic Preservation Act of 1966 (NHPA) ===
The National Historic Preservation Act of 1966 (NHPA) was intended to establish a program that would further the preservation of additional historic properties throughout the United States.

=== Section 106 of the National Historic Preservation Act ===
Under section 106 of the National Historic Preservation Act, federal agencies are required to consider the consequences of their activities on historic properties and allow the Advisory Council for Historic Preservation to consult on the issue.

=== Archaeological Resources Protection Act (ARPA) of 1979 ===
The Archaeological Resources Protection Act of 1979 was intended to protect archaeological and cultural resources on public and Indian lands for future generations. Additionally the ARPA was to improve relations between the government, professional archaeologists, and private citizens.

=== Native American Graves Protection and Repatriation Act (NAGPRA) of 1990 ===
The Native American Graves Protection and Repatriation Act (NAGPRA) gives the rights to Native American descendants of the treatment of Native American remains and funerary goods.

=== Chapter 872.05-- Unmarked Human Burials (Florida Statutes, Title XLVI, Offenses Concerning Dead Bodies and Graves) ===
Chapter 872.05 ensures that all human burials be treated with proper respect and dignity regardless of the background of the individual and the location of the site be it on state, submerged, or private lands.
