= El Jobean Hotel =

- U.S. National Register of Historic Places
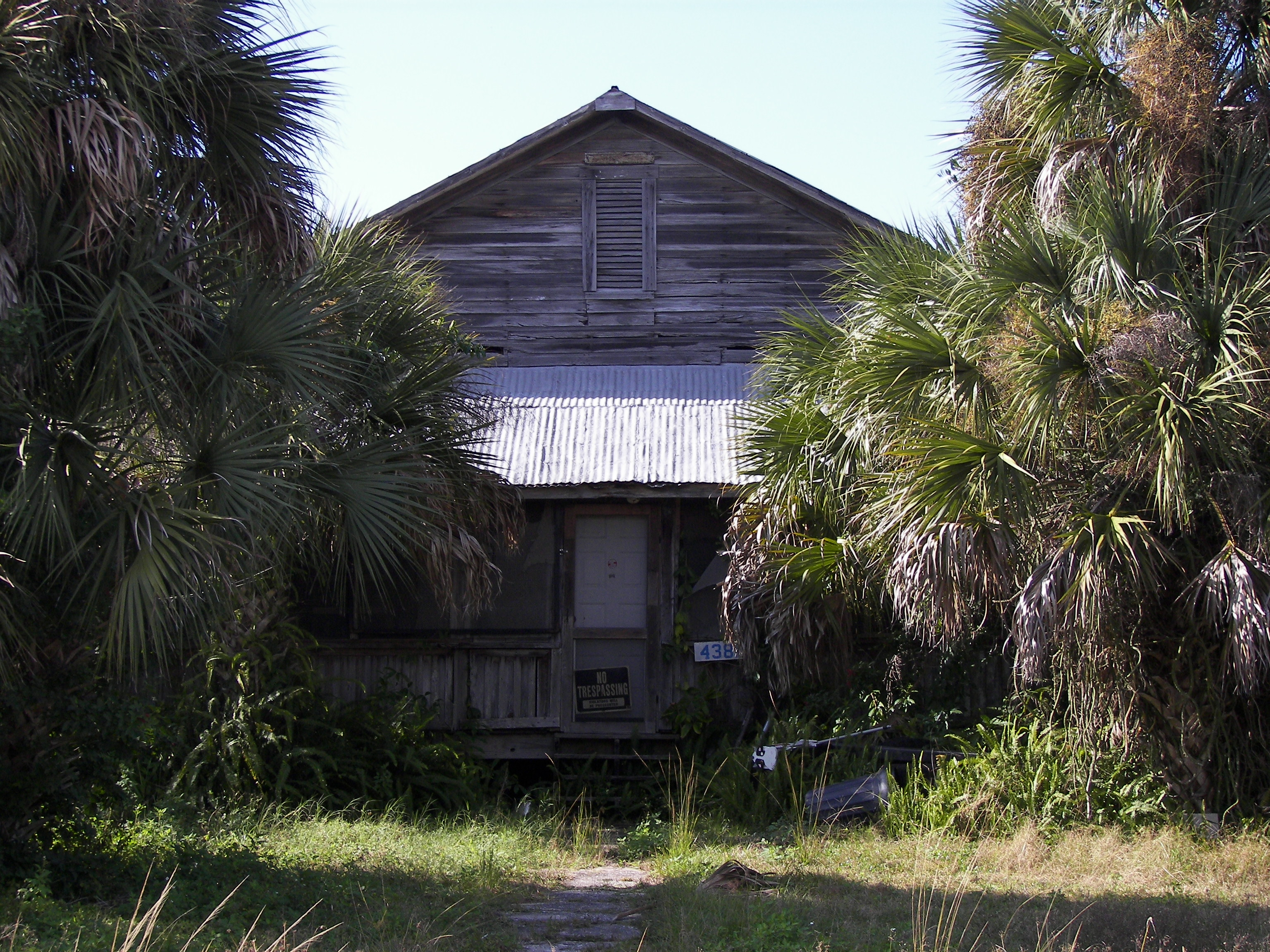

- Location within Florida Location within the United States
- Location: El Jobean, Florida, United States
- Coordinates: 26°57′50″N 82°12′46″W
- NRHP reference No.: 99001203
- Added to NRHP: September 29, 1999

The El Jobean Hotel (also known as the Grand Hotel-El Jobean Fishing Lodge) was a historic hotel in El Jobean, Florida, United States. It was located at 4381 Garden Road, across the street from the El Jobean Post Office and General Store and was add to the U.S. National Register of Historic Places on September 29, 1999. It was demolished in 2022

== References and external links ==
- Charlotte County listings at National Register of Historic Places
