= Fish Cabin at White Rock Shoals =

- U.S. National Register of Historic Places
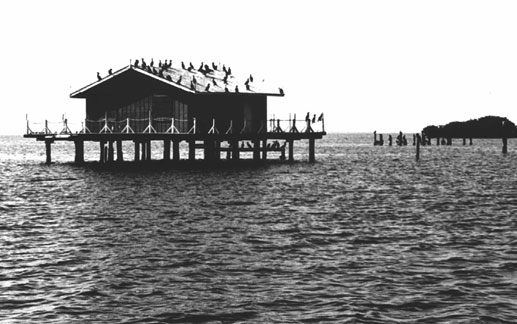
- Fish cabin over the water at White Rock Shoals

- Location within Florida Location within the United States
- Location: South end of Pine Island in Pine Island Sound
- Nearest city: St. James City, Florida
- Coordinates: 26°32′41″N 82°7′19″W
- Built: Before 1930
- Built by: Punta Gorda Fish Co.
- Architectural style: Vernacular
- MPS: Fish Cabins of Charlotte Harbor MPS (64500105)
- NRHP reference No.: 91000398
- Added to NRHP: 11 April 1991

The Fish Cabin at White Rock Shoals is a historic fish cabin near St. James City, Florida.

== Description and history ==
The fish cabin is located at the south end of Pine Island in the Pine Island Sound. It was built before 1930 by the Punta Gorda Fish Co. The building was listed on the National Register of Historic Places in 1991 as part of a multiple property submission of fish cabins in Charlotte Harbor.

== See also ==
- Commercial fishing – Recreational fishing
- Historic preservation
- List of historic Fish Cabins of Charlotte Harbor, Florida
- National Register of Historic Places in Lee County, Florida
