= Mott Willis Store =

- U.S. National Register of Historic Places
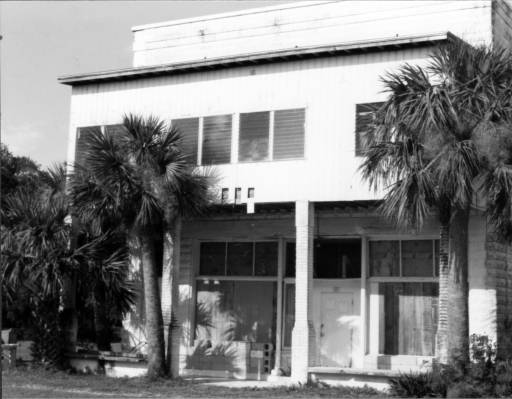
- Mott Willis Store, Charlotte Harbor, FL c. 1922, second construction, concrete blocks, replacing original wood structure constructed by Knight.

- Location within Florida Location within the United States
- Location: Charlotte Harbor, Florida
- Coordinates: 26°57′29″N 82°4′31″W
- NRHP reference No.: 97000434
- Added to NRHP: May 30, 1997

The Mott Willis Store, also known as the Knight-Willis Store, was a historic building in Charlotte Harbor, Florida. It was located at 22960 Bayshore Road. On May 30, 1997, it was added to the U.S. National Register of Historic Places. However, the following year it was demolished.

In 2000, an archeological dig was performed at the Mott Willis General Store site. Artifacts recovered from the excavation are on display at the Charlotte Harbor Historic Center.

== History ==
The Mott Willis Store, originally known as the Knight-Willis Store, was opened by cattle barons, Joel and Thomas Knight, during the initial American settlement and growth of the Hickory Bluff area, after the Civil War in 1872. The store was then purchased by Mott Willis in 1912. Willis reconstructed the store from its original wood structure to a concrete block building in 1922.

In the 1970s, the store was known as The White Elephant and sold used goods and salvaged building materials before being transformed into a theater for the Charlotte Players.

Efforts to save and restore the store by the Knight Historic Building, Inc. were defeated in court and the structure was destroyed in 1998.
