= El Jobean Post Office and General Store =

- U.S. National Register of Historic Places
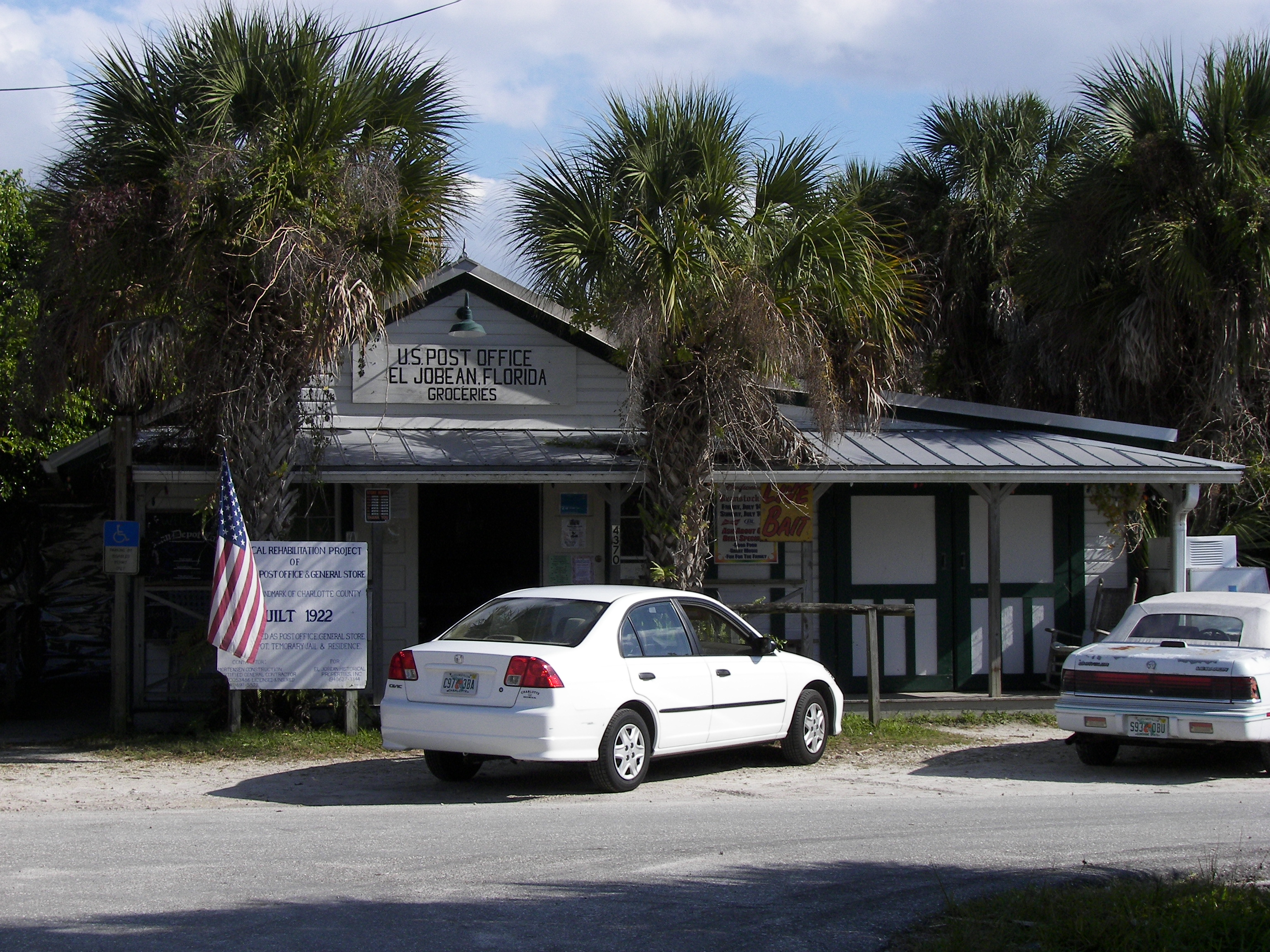

- Location within Florida Location within the United States
- Location: El Jobean, Florida, United States
- Coordinates: 26°57′51″N 82°12′43″W
- Built: 1923
- NRHP reference No.: 99001028
- Added to NRHP: August 27, 1999

The El Jobean Post Office and General Store is a historic combined store and post office in El Jobean, Florida, United States. It is located at 4370 Garden Road. It was added to the National Register of Historic Places in 1999.

== Gallery ==
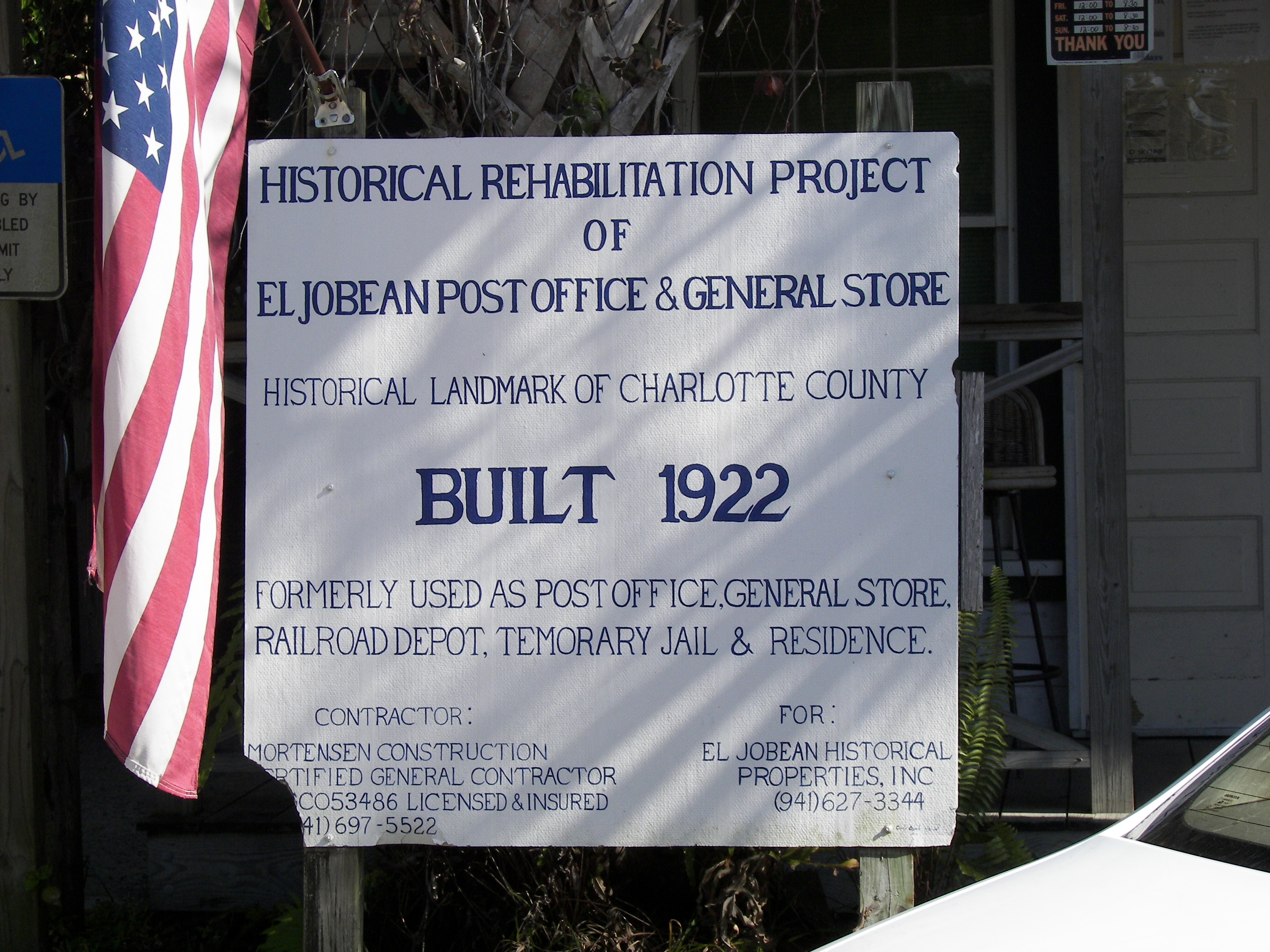

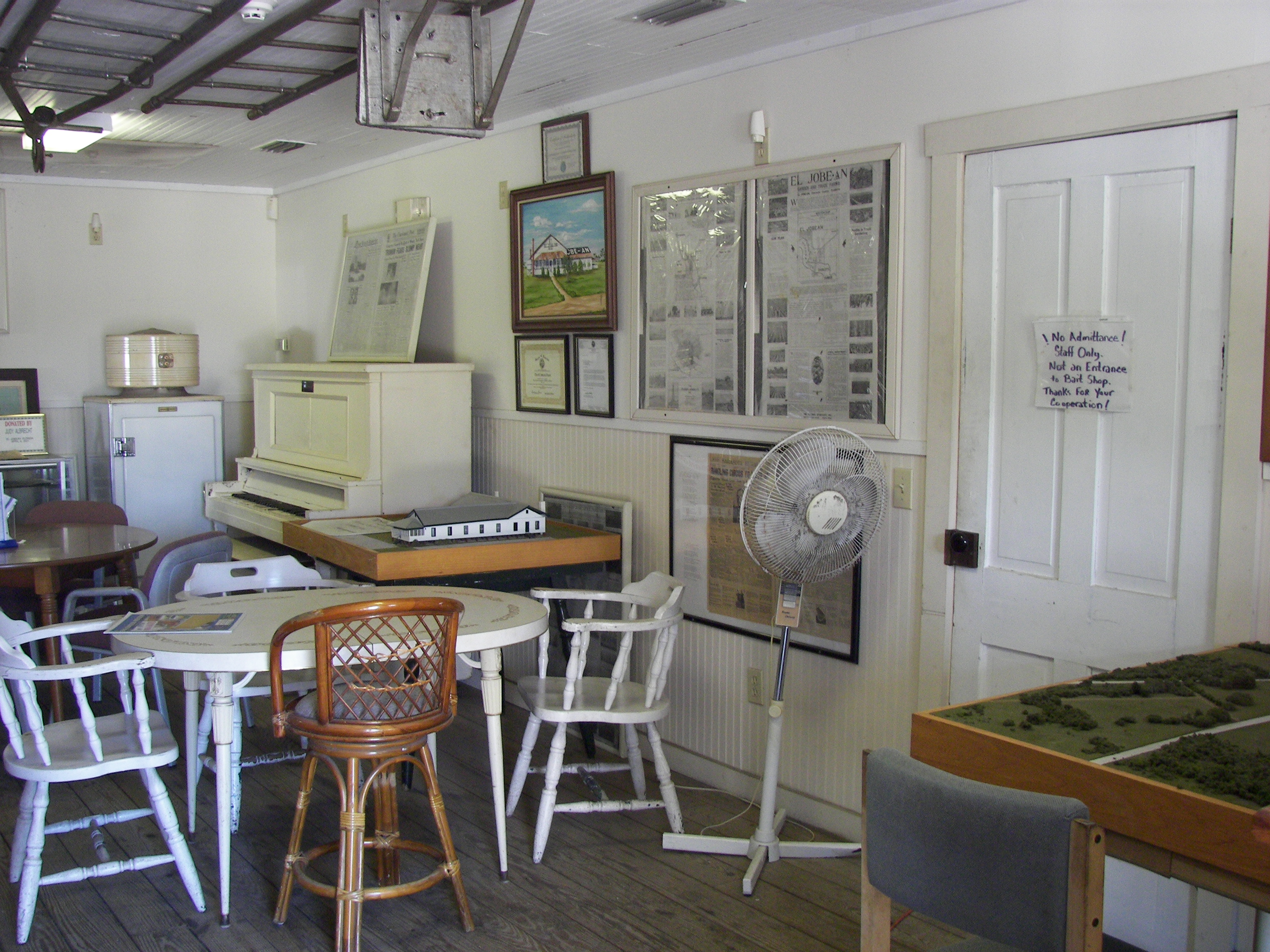

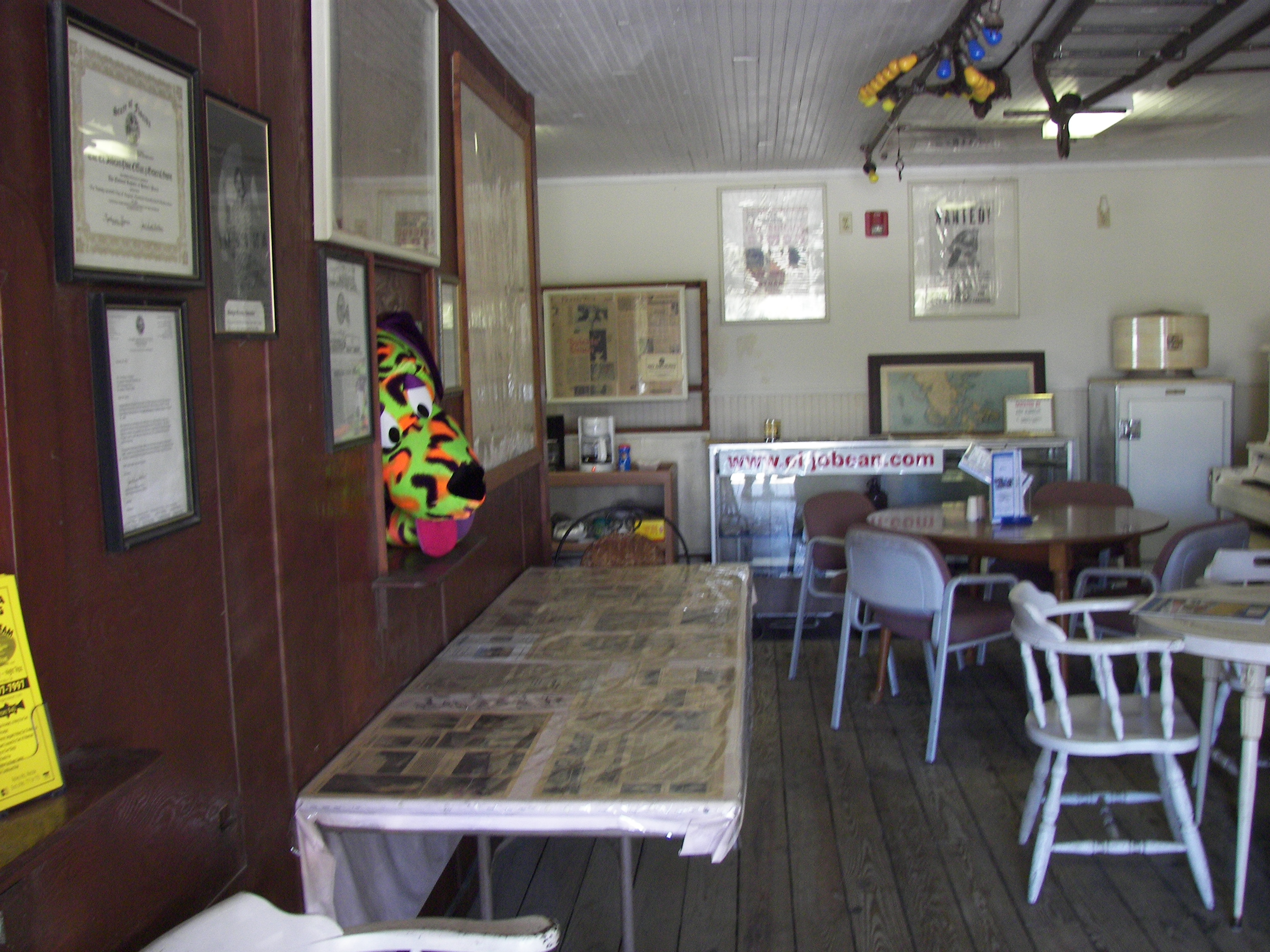

== See also ==
- List of United States post offices

== References and external links ==
- Charlotte County listings at National Register of Historic Places
- El Jobean Post Office and General Store at Florida's Office of Cultural and Historical Programs
