= Punta Gorda Fish Company Ice House =

- U.S. National Register of Historic Places
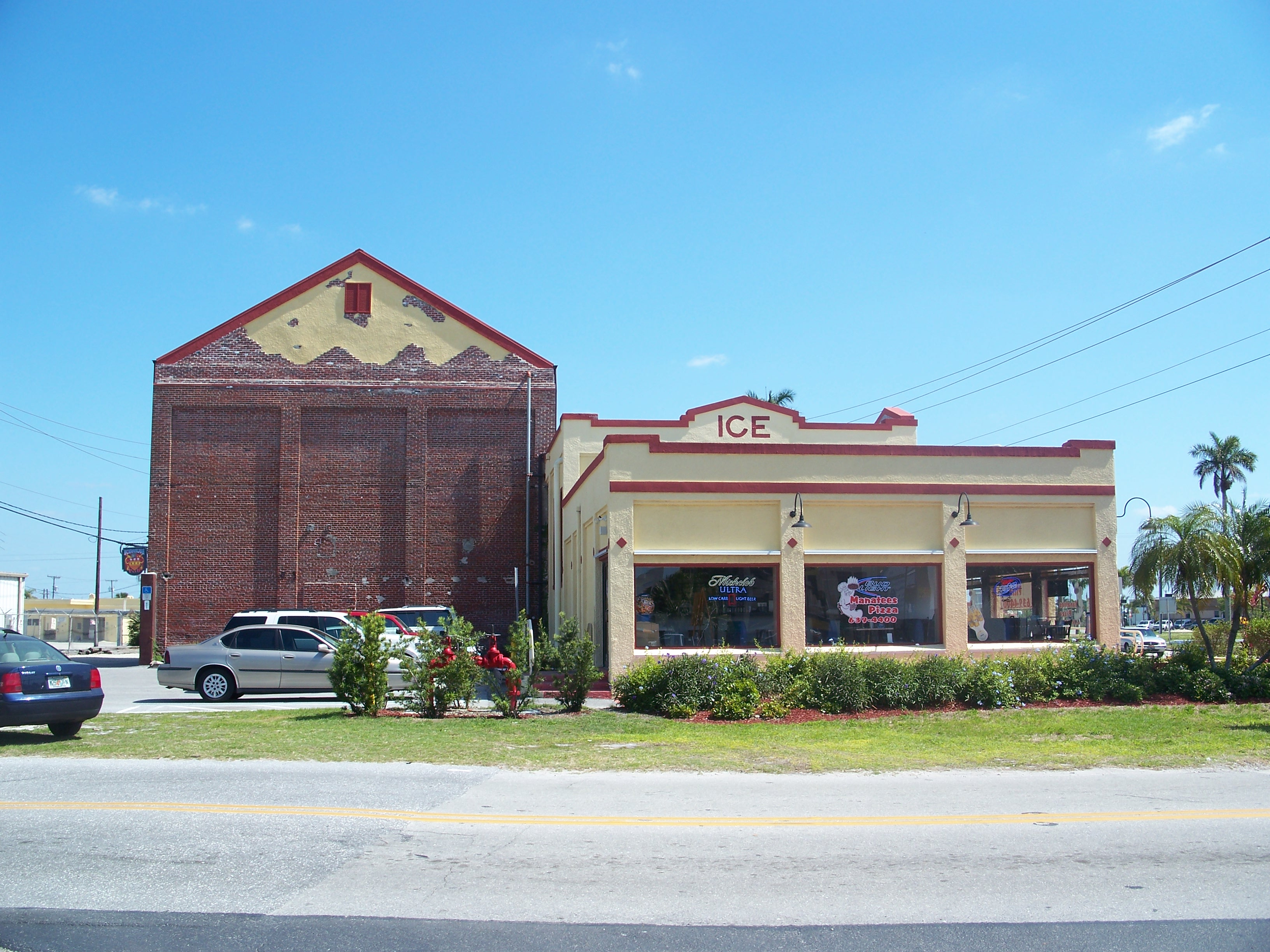

- Location within Florida Location within the United States
- Location: Lee County, Florida
- Nearest city: North Captiva Island
- Coordinates: 26°35′56″N 82°12′49″W
- NRHP reference No.: 89000320
- Added to NRHP: April 20, 1989

The Punta Gorda Fish Company Ice House is a historic site near North Captiva Island, Florida. It is located at the north shore entrance to Safety Harbor. On April 20, 1989, it was added to the U.S. National Register of Historic Places.

== See also ==
- Punta Gorda Ice Plant
