= List of historic Fish Cabins of Charlotte Harbor, Florida =

- Fish Cabins of Charlotte Harbor
- U.S. National Register of Historic Places
- Location: Charlotte and Lee counties
- MPS
- NRHP reference No.: 64500105
- Added to NRHP: April 10, 1991

The following buildings in Charlotte and Lee counties were added to the National Register of Historic Places as part of the Fish Cabins of Charlotte Harbor Multiple Property Submission (or MPS).

== Current listings ==
	Name on the Register	Image	Date listed	Location	City or town	Description
1	Icing Station at Bull Bay		April 11, 1991 (Ref. # missing)	Off Bull Key in Bull Bay; 26°46′20″N 82°12′18″W	Placida	
2	West Coast Fish Company Residential Cabin at Bull Bay		April 11, 1991 (Ref. # missing)	Bull Bay north of Bull Key; 26°46′33″N 82°12′14″W	Placida	
3	Willis Fish Cabin at Bull Bay	Willis Fish Cabin at Bull Bay	April 11, 1991 (Ref. # missing)	Bull Bay north of Bull Key; 26°46′28″N 82°12′29″W	Placida	
4	Fish Cabin at White Rock Shoals	Fish Cabin at White Rock Shoals	April 11, 1991 (Ref. # missing)	West of Pine Island in Pine Island Sound; 26°32′41″N 82°07′19″W	St. James City	
5	Hendrickson Fish Cabin at Captiva Rocks	Hendrickson Fish Cabin at Captiva Rocks	April 11, 1991 (Ref. # missing)	West of Little Wood Key in Pine Island Sound; 26°37′42″N 82°11′29″W	Bokeelia	
6	Ice House at Captiva Rocks	Ice House at Captiva Rocks	April 11, 1991 (Ref. # missing)	Southwest of Little Wood Key in Pine Island Sound; 26°37′35″N 82°11′07″W	Bokeelia	
7	Ice House at Point Blanco	Ice House at Point Blanco	April 11, 1991 (Ref. # missing)	Southeast of Point Blanco Island in Pine Island Sound; 26°40′30″N 82°13′31″W	Bokeelia	
8	Larsen Fish Cabin at Captiva Rocks	Larsen Fish Cabin at Captiva Rocks	April 11, 1991 (Ref. # missing)	West of Little Wood Key in Pine Island Sound; 26°37′46″N 82°11′29″W	Bokeelia	
9	Leneer Fish Cabin at Captiva Rocks	Leneer Fish Cabin at Captiva Rocks	April 11, 1991 (Ref. # missing)	West of Little Wood Key in Pine Island Sound; 26°37′38″N 82°11′25″W	Bokeelia	
10	Norton Fish Cabin at Captiva Rocks	Norton Fish Cabin at Captiva Rocks	April 11, 1991 (Ref. # missing)	West of Little Wood Key in Pine Island Sound; 26°37′47″N 82°11′32″W	Bokeelia	
11	Punta Gorda Fish Company Cabin	Punta Gorda Fish Company Cabin	December 18, 2003 (Ref. # missing)	Pines Island Sound; 26°37′41″N 82°11′26″W	Bokeelia	
12	Whidden Fish Cabin at Captiva Rocks		April 11, 1991 (Ref. # missing)	West of Little Wood Key in Pine Island Sound; 26°37′35″N 82°11′24″W	Bokeelia	

== See also ==
- Punta Gorda Fish Co.
