= Punta Gorda Ice Plant =

- U.S. National Register of Historic Places
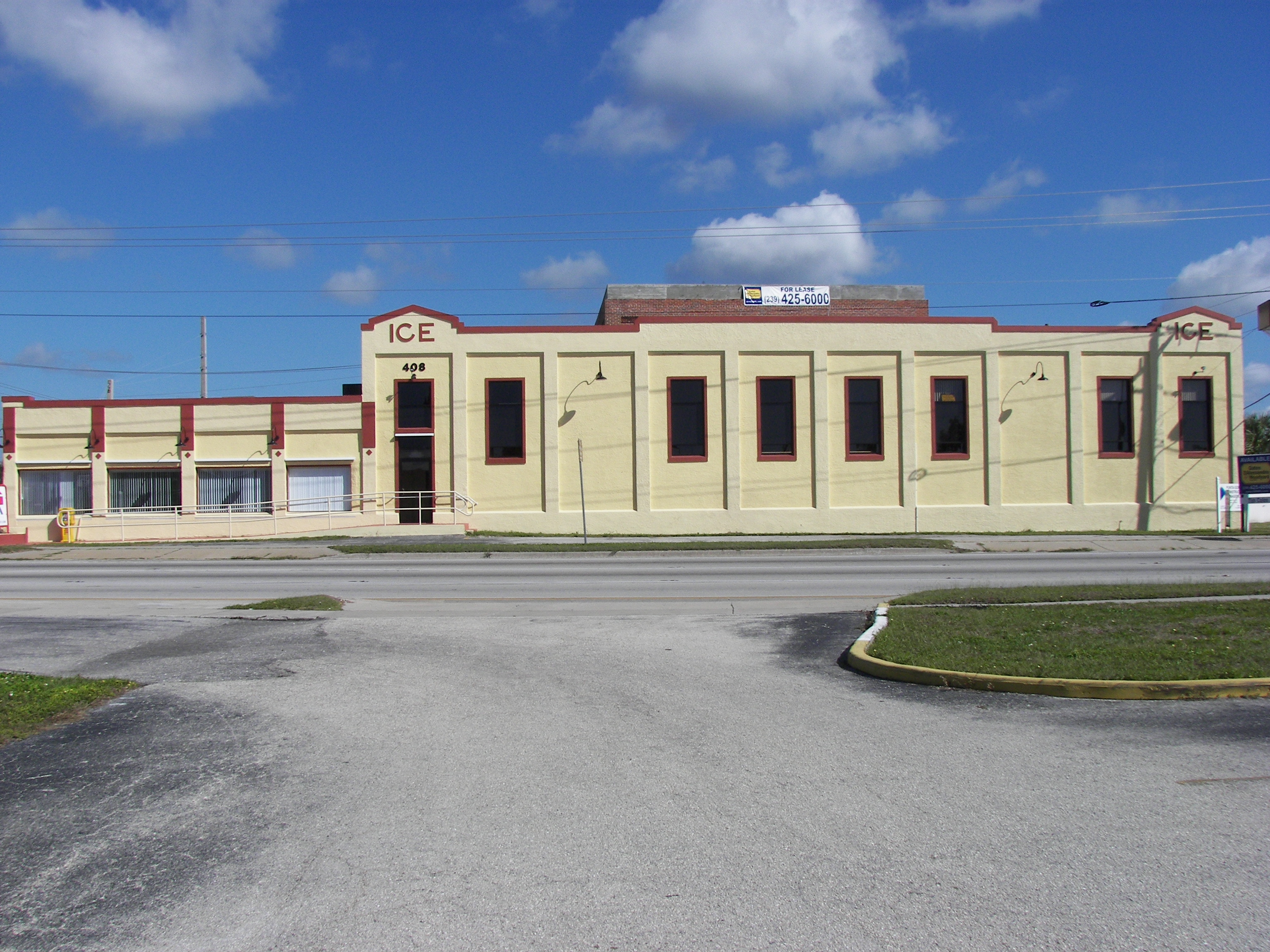
- Location: Charlotte County, Florida, U.S.
- Nearest city: Punta Gorda
- Coordinates: 26°55′57″N 82°2′50″W
- MPS: Punta Gorda MPS
- NRHP reference No.: 90001798
- Added to NRHP: December 12, 1990

The Punta Gorda Ice Plant (also known as the Kazwells Furniture Store) is a historic ice plant in Punta Gorda, Florida, United States. It is located at 408 Tamiami Trail. Currently, it houses a pub and pizzeria. It was added to the National Register of Historic Places in 1990.

== See also ==
- Punta Gorda Fish Company Ice House
