= El Jobean, Florida =

Unincorporated community in Florida, U.S.

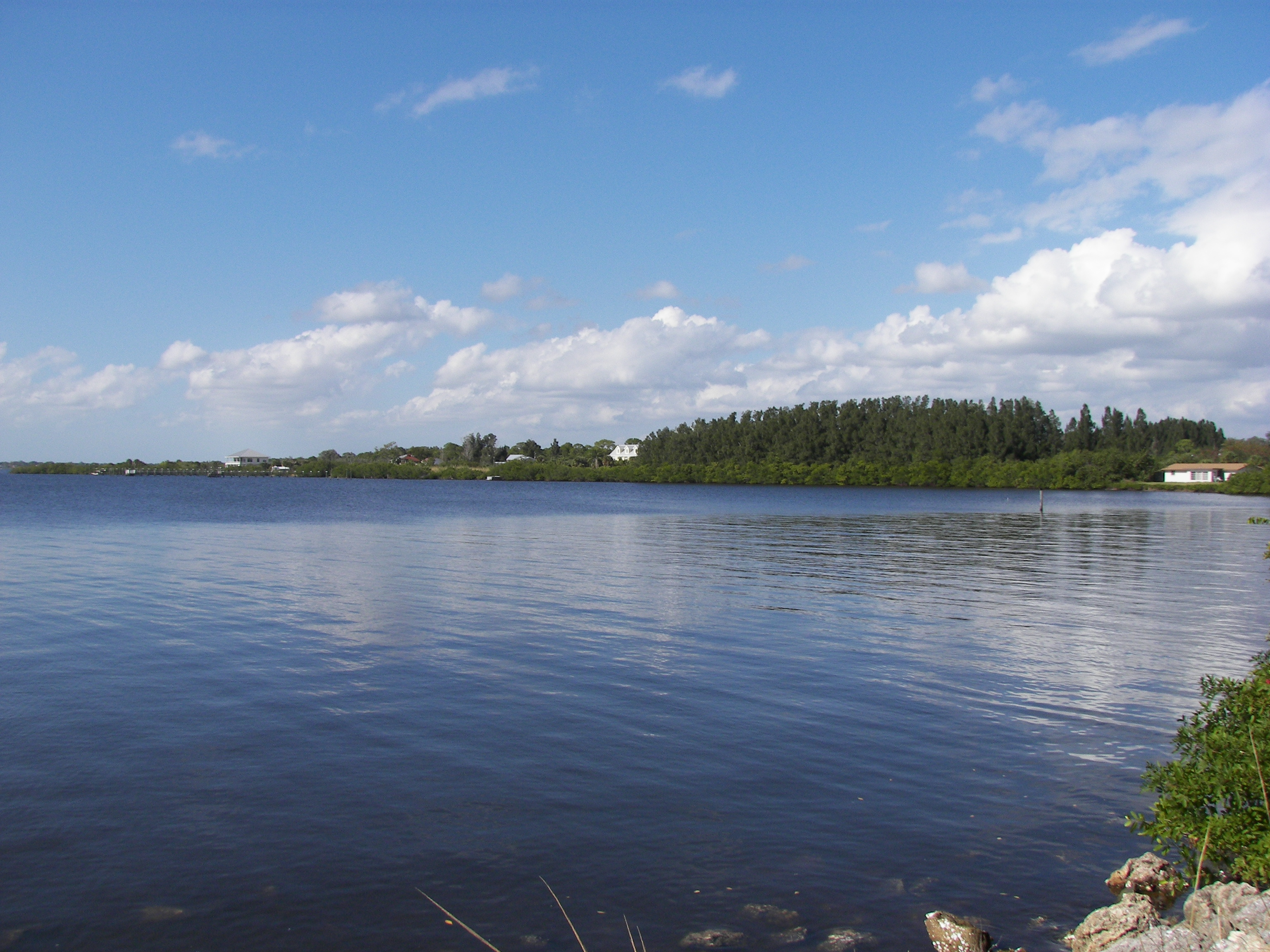
Myakka River in El Jobean

Location of El Jobean in Florida

El Jobean is an unincorporated community in Charlotte County, Florida, United States. It is located off State Road 776, on the northern banks of the Myakka River. The community is part of the Sarasota-Bradenton-Punta Gorda Combined Statistical Area. The ZIP Code for El Jobean is 33953.

== History ==
A post office called El Jobean was established in 1924, and remained in operation until 1964. The name El Jobean is an anagram of the letters of "Joel Bean", the name of the property developer who laid out the town site in the 1920s.

== Geography ==
El Jobean is located at 26°57′52″N 82°12′38″W.

== Gallery ==
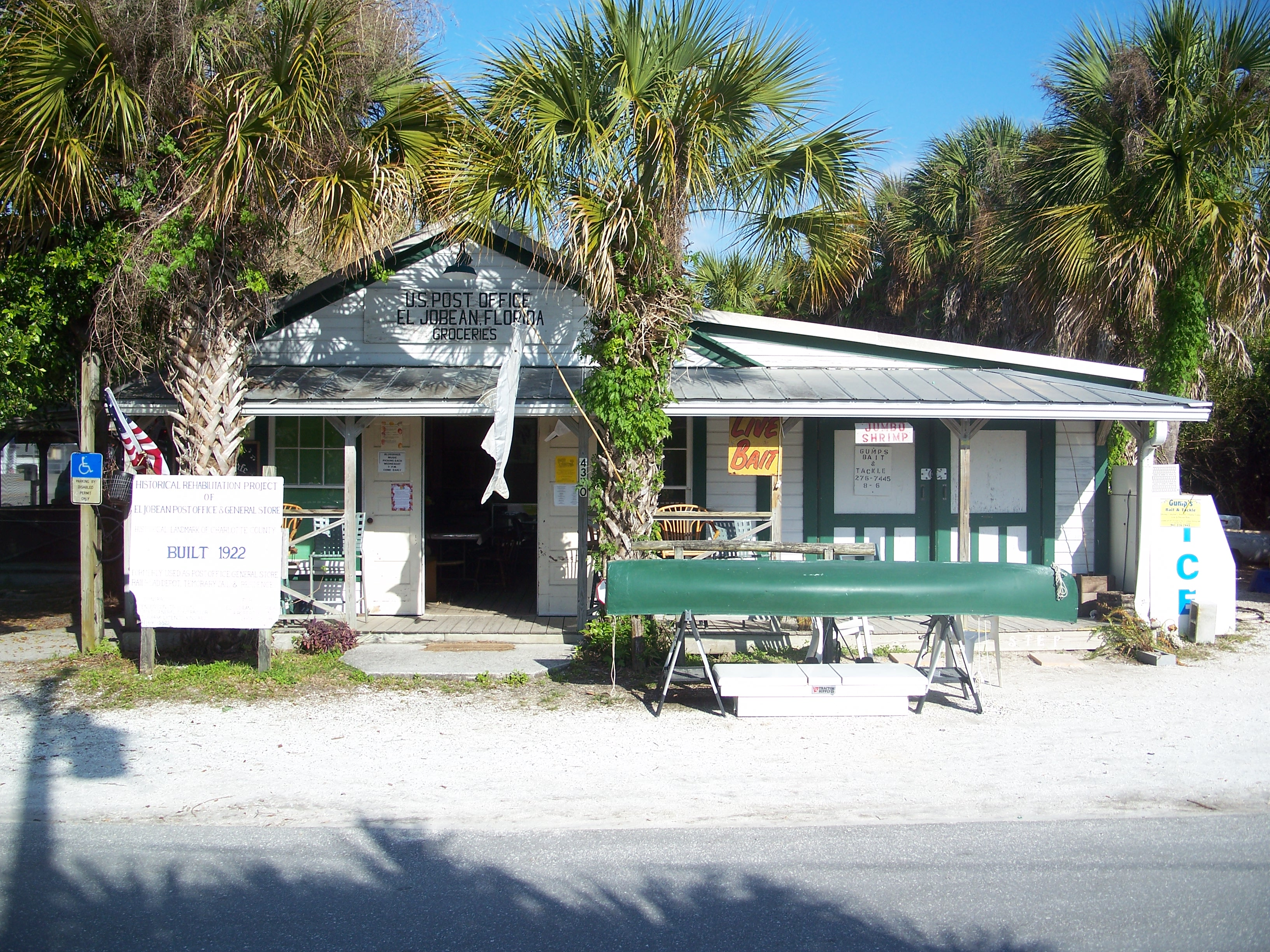
El Jobean Post Office & General Store

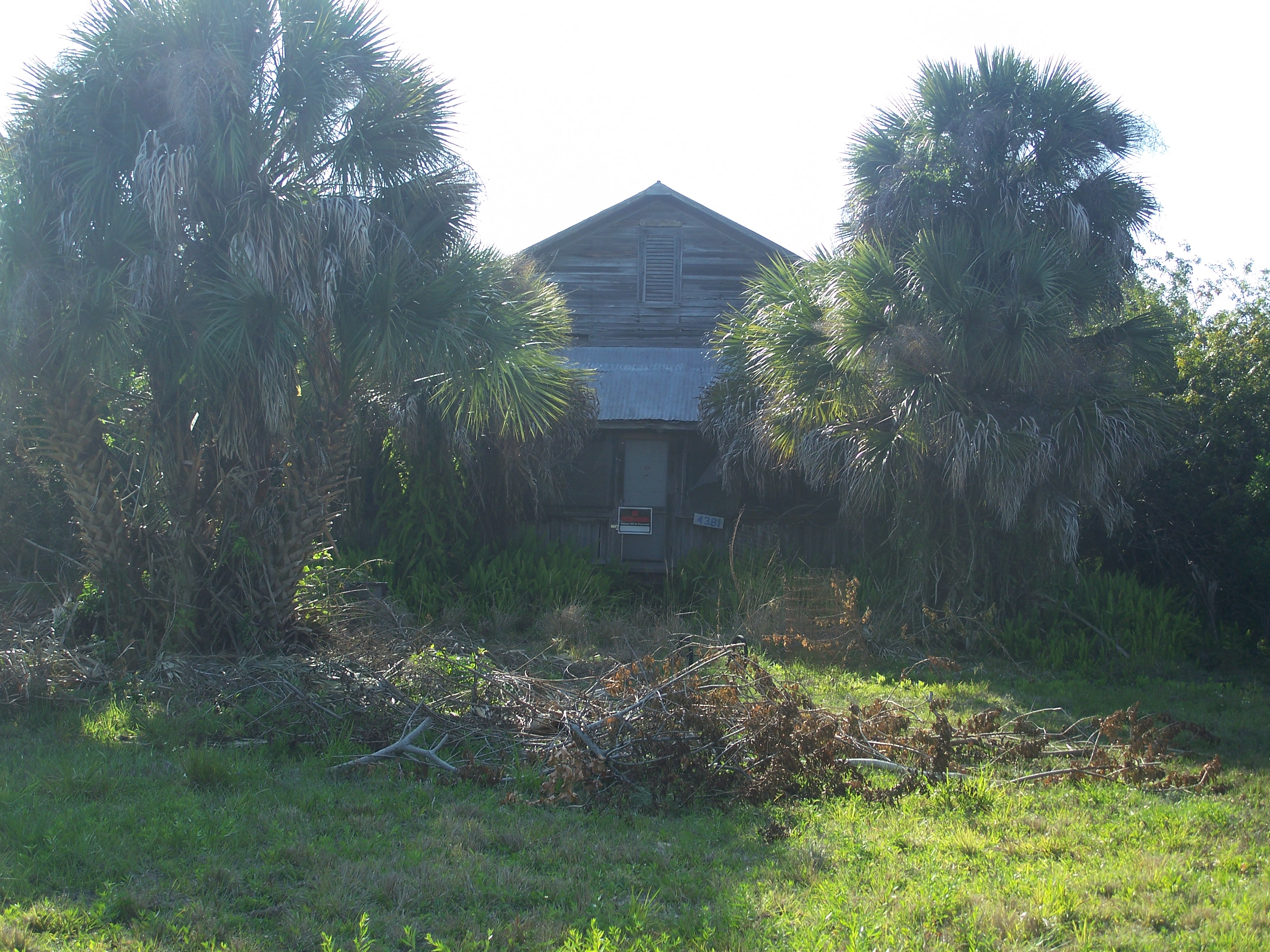
El Jobean Hotel

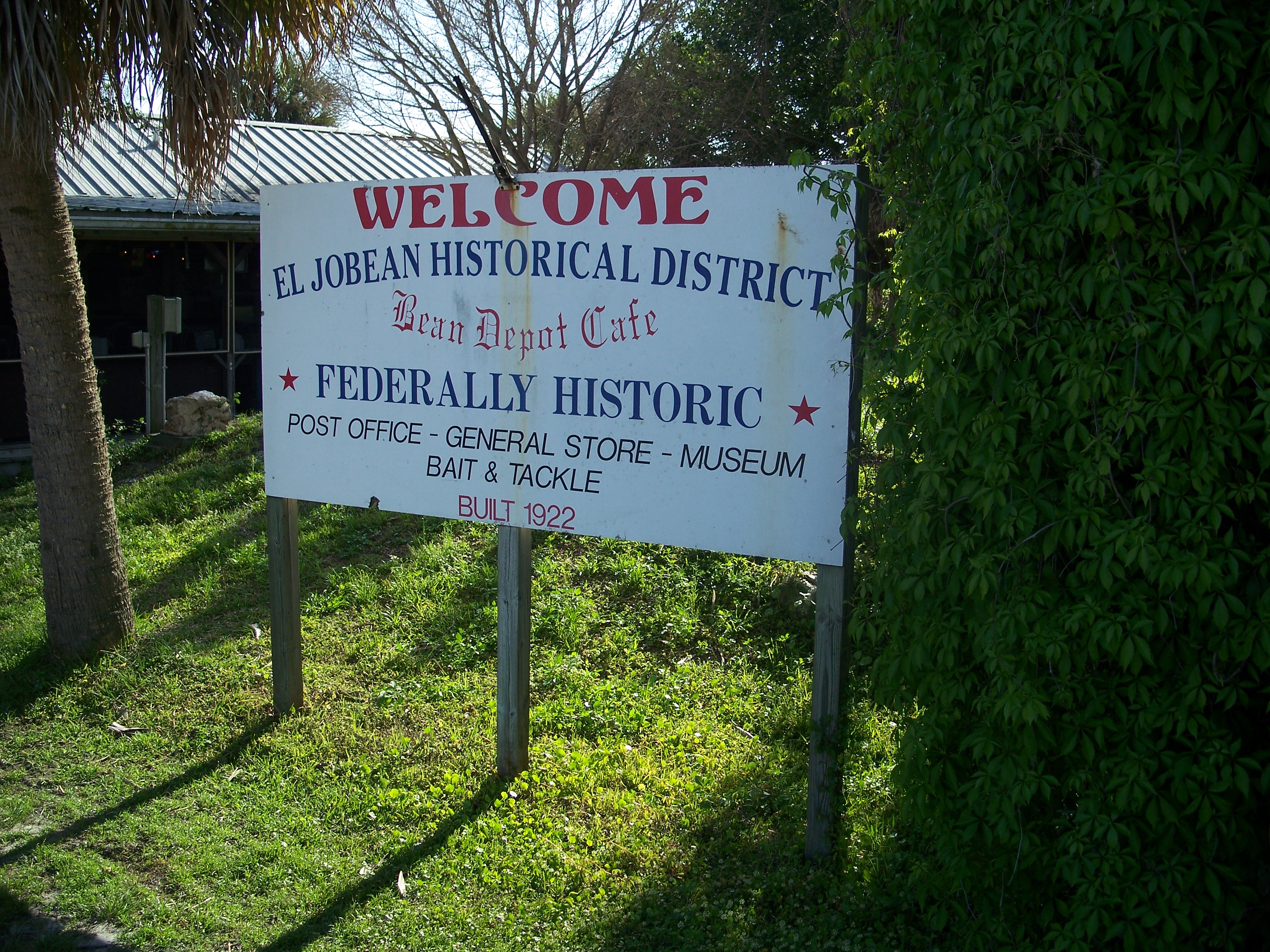
Welcome sign

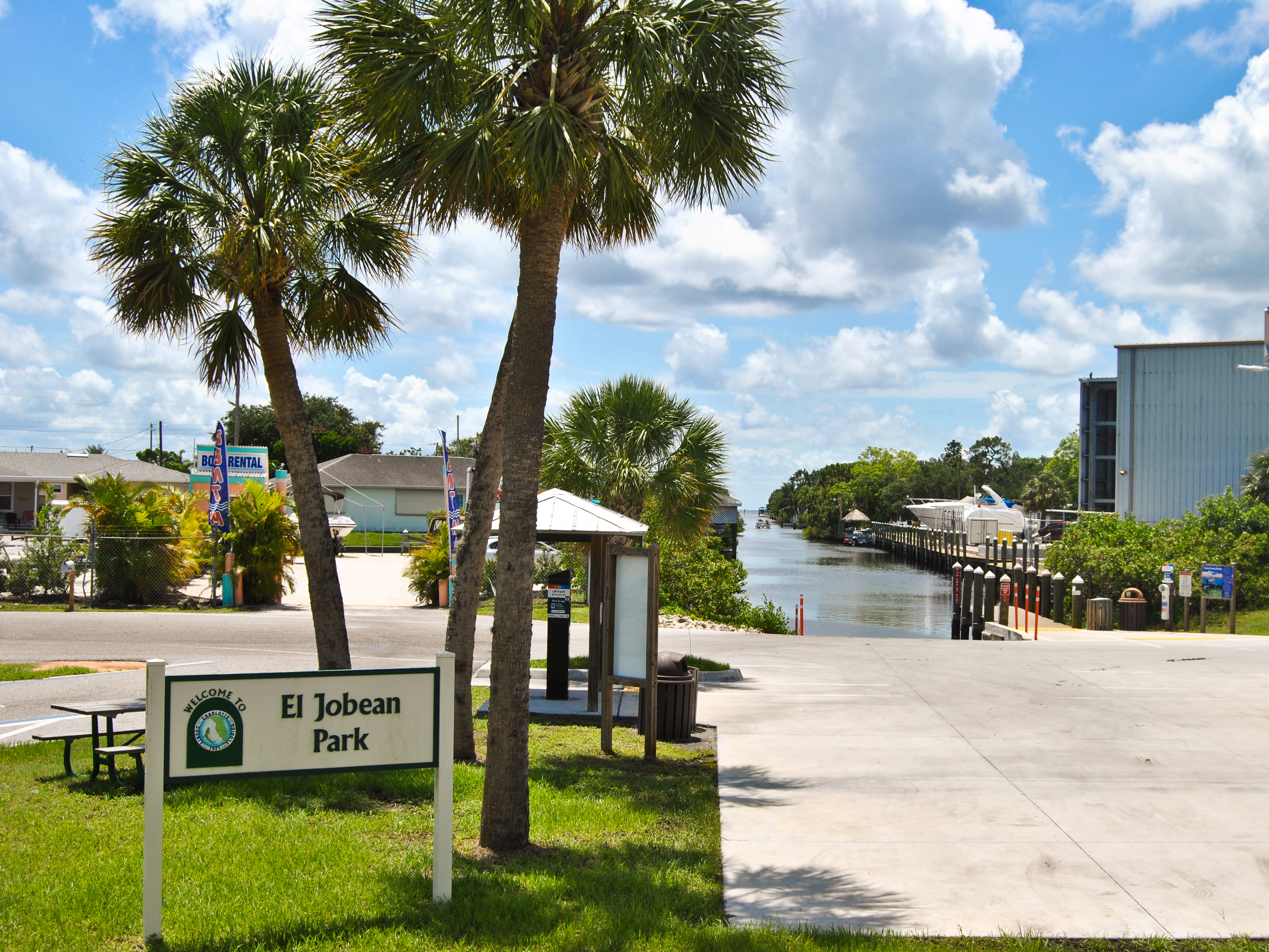
El Jobean Park and its boat launch

== See also ==
List of geographic names derived from anagrams and ananyms
