= Big Mound Key-Boggess Ridge Archeological District =

Archaeological site in Florida, US

- U.S. National Register of Historic Places
- U.S. Historic district
- Location within Florida
- Location: Charlotte County, Florida
- Nearest city: Placida, Florida
- Coordinates: 26°48′32″N 82°13′8″W
- Area: 3,910 acres (15.8 km^{2})
- NRHP reference No.: 90001764
- Added to NRHP: December 3, 1990

The Big Mound Key-Boggess Ridge Archeological District is a historic site located southeast of Placida, Florida. Big Mound Key (archaeological site designation 8CH10) is just off the mainland of the southern end of Cape Haze, at the entrance to Charlotte Harbor. The nearby Boggess Ridge has three archaeological sites (8CH16, 8CH19 and 8CH34). Both Big Mound Key and Boggess Ridge are in the Cape Haze Management Unit of Charlotte Harbor Preserve State Park. On December 3, 1990, it was added to the U.S. National Register of Historic Places.

The archaeological site on Big Mound Key covers 13.5 acres (5.5 ha), and includes four 20-foot (6.1 m) tall mounds arranged in a rectangle, linear ridges, and possible canals. The mounds and ridges consist primarily of conch shells. A radiocarbon date of about 2000 years old has been obtained from near the base of the trenched mound. Most radiocarbon dates and ceramics are from the Weeden Island culture period, about 400 to 900. The mound was the site of a village, possibly the seat of a large chiefdom, serving as an intermediate trade point between the Manasota people of the Tampa Bay area and the Calusa people to the south. There is evidence that the chief lived at the top of one of the mounds.

Despite the site's significance, there has yet to be an extensive excavation and publishing of the findings. The first survey reported was by John Goggin and his students in the early 1950s and later by Bullen & Bullen in 1956. The ceramics taken from the site were consistent with the Glades Period, plain, sand-tempered types found throughout the single south Florida prehistoric culture region.

Archaeologist George Luer began investigating Big Mound Key after looters used a bulldozer in 1981 to open up a mound in search of Spanish gold. The land had been purchased by the State of Florida in 1978, but little was done to protect the site. After obtaining a grant from the State of Florida, Luer led an intensive excavation of the site from 2008 until 2011. Consistent with Luer's theories, despite the overwhelming evidence of: the large mounds made of conch shells, the four semi-circular sand ridges, the hand-dug canal to the mounds from the water, and the high frequency of Glades ceramics, he attributed the site to the Weedon Island culture and not the Calusa. In the same vein, archaeologist Jeffrey McClain Mitchem in his 1989 graduate dissertation stated that this was actually a Safety Harbor Culture site. More recent research shows that the site was much earlier and shares its earthwork forms with those of Poverty Point in Louisiana. A 2011 linguistics study by Julian Granberry links the Calusa to the Tunica Indians who built Poverty Point. There are no known mound complexes on Weeden Island or Safety Harbor that are in any way similar to Big Mound Key.
