= Port Charlotte High School =

Public school in Florida, U.S.

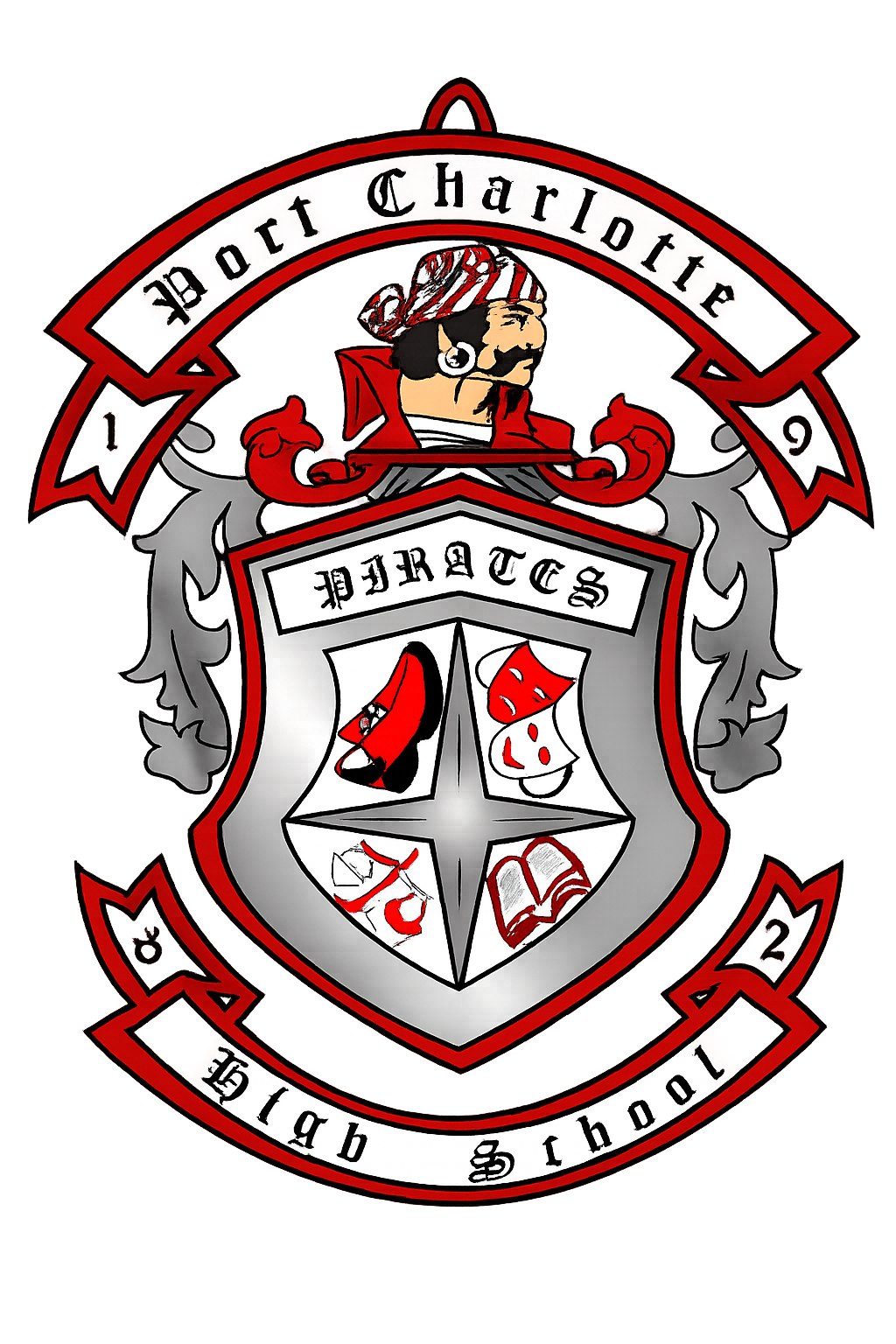

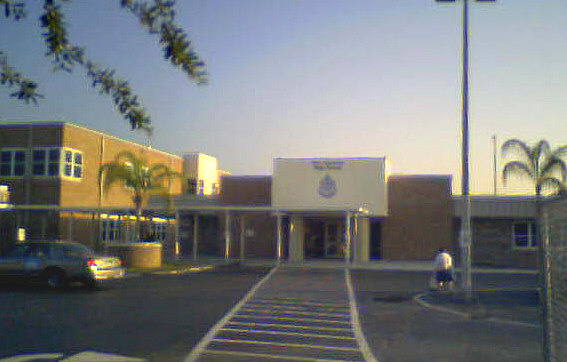

Location
- 18200 Cochran Boulevard; Port Charlotte, Florida 33948; United States; 27°00′12″N 82°09′03″W

Information
- Type: Public
- Established: 1981; 45 years ago
- NCES School ID: 120024002122
- Principal: James Vernon
- Staff: 80.00 (FTE)
- Grades: 9–12
- Enrollment: 1,659 (2023–2024)
- Student to teacher ratio: 20.54
- Campus: Suburban
- Colors: Red and Black
- Athletics: Florida High School Athletic Association
- Mascot: Pirate
- Website: www.yourcharlotteschools.net/pchs

Port Charlotte High School (PCHS) is a public comprehensive high school located in Port Charlotte, Florida, United States, and is located adjacent to Charlotte Technical College. The school opened in 1981 and graduated its first class in 1984. Its mascot is the pirate, and the school motto is "Yes, I am a Pirate." It is operated by Charlotte County Public Schools.

At one point in time, Port Charlotte High School was the largest high school in Charlotte County, with 2,082 students enrolled in grades 9 through 12. Charlotte County Public Schools has "controlled open enrollment" in which students are generally assigned to a specific school by default based on geographic location, but families choose to enroll students at a different school if the selected school is not at capacity.

The school's campus has expanded significantly since its establishment, and it survived Hurricane Charley in 2004 and Hurricane Ian in 2022. The school's main feeders are Murdock Middle School and Port Charlotte Middle School. The school's top athletic rival is Charlotte High School. Alumni include three National Football League players and two Major League Baseball player, one of whom also played in the 2008 Summer Olympics.

== History ==
=== Early history ===
Before the construction of Port Charlotte High School and Lemon Bay High School, all senior high school students (grades 9–12) in Charlotte County were bussed to Charlotte High School in Punta Gorda. With Charlotte County's increasing population, planning and budgeting for a new high school in Port Charlotte began in the 1970s. In 1978, the school board authorized payment of $174,500 to General Development Corporation for land to construct the proposed new high school, and the school board began soliciting bids from construction contractors in 1980. Construction started on Port Charlotte High School in 1981, and it opened its doors the next year for 9th and 10th graders.

At inception, the school had 26 teachers and 627 students, of whom only 2% were non-white. For each of the next two years, a class was added, and PCHS graduated its first class in 1984. By 1996, PCHS had 1,342 students, 78.3% of whom were white, 14.1% of whom were black, 6.5% of whom were Hispanic, and 1.1% of whom were Asian, with no students identifying as Native American. By 2002, the student population had reached 1,994. A Technology Training Center was established at the school in 1993 to assist teachers in integrating computers into their daily activities, and the school was retrofitted for computer technology in 1995–1996, ahead of 1996 district-wide communication link.

=== Hurricane Charley ===
On August 13, 2004, Hurricane Charley brought devastation to the Port Charlotte region. Although Port Charlotte High School suffered only minor damage from the hurricane, other regional high schools suffered significant damage. In the aftermath, Port Charlotte High School shared its facility with the students of Charlotte High School, with Port Charlotte High School students attending morning class and Charlotte High School students attending in the evening. Later in September, Hurricane Frances and Hurricane Jeanne prompted Charlotte County Schools to be closed once again. In total, the three hurricanes caused students to miss 13 days of school during the 2004–2005 school year, requiring make-up days that infringed on students' and staff members' days off.

=== Westboro Baptist Church protest ===
Port Charlotte High School has a Gay-Straight Alliance club, and the first meeting of the group on campus was organized by then-student Asher Levine. The club had previously faced backlash from the student-led organization Teens Against Gays, and members of the group wore shirts bearing the club's name to show opposition to it. On December 19, 2005, the club attracted protestors from the recognized hate group Westboro Baptist Church of Topeka, Kansas. Levine asked students to wear all-white to symbolize peace, and he passed out fliers about hateful language and bullying statistics in schools despite the administration prohibiting counter-protests.

The Westboro Baptist Church protestors were prohibited from entering school grounds but were allowed to picket across the street from the school, and additional officers were brought to campus in anticipation of the protest. Counter-protesters met the protestors outside the school and outnumbered the protestors around fifty to twenty-five. Levine expressed disappointment with the incident afterward, saying that the support from the student body was not what he had hoped for. The Gay-Straight Alliance ceased to exist at PCHS for several years, but was later revived.

=== Hurricane Ian ===
On September 28, 2022, Hurricane Ian brought considerable wind as well as flooding and storm surge damage to the Port Charlotte region. All schools and ancillary facilities in the Charlotte County Public Schools system received considerable damage from Ian. However, Port Charlotte High School was one of the 19 schools in Charlotte County that were able to reopen 3 weeks after the schools were forced to close due to the storm. The school was closed for another day due to Hurricane Nicole in early November, which passed northeast of the school and brought tropical storm conditions to the area. In total, 16 school days were missed because of the systems during the 2022–2023 school year. Ian knocked over the floodlights around the football field, ripped open the roof of the football team's weight room, damaged the scoreboard, and destroyed sporting equipment. Because of the damage, the football team had to play the last six of their games away from home, and players were forced to weight lift on the school tennis court under a tent. Despite that the Pirates secured their first district title since 2013 following a win against Braden River.

A combination of private donations from individuals and businesses and funds from Charlotte County allowed the school to build a "state-of-the-art" weight room, a new scoreboard, and new LED lights, which enable a light show during halftime of football games. The school also repainted the exterior, power-washed sidewalks, deep-cleaned bathrooms, replaced carpets, and removed the old JROTC obstacle course and added new sod there and to the football field. New restrooms were added between the fields, and several roofs were replaced.

== Campus ==
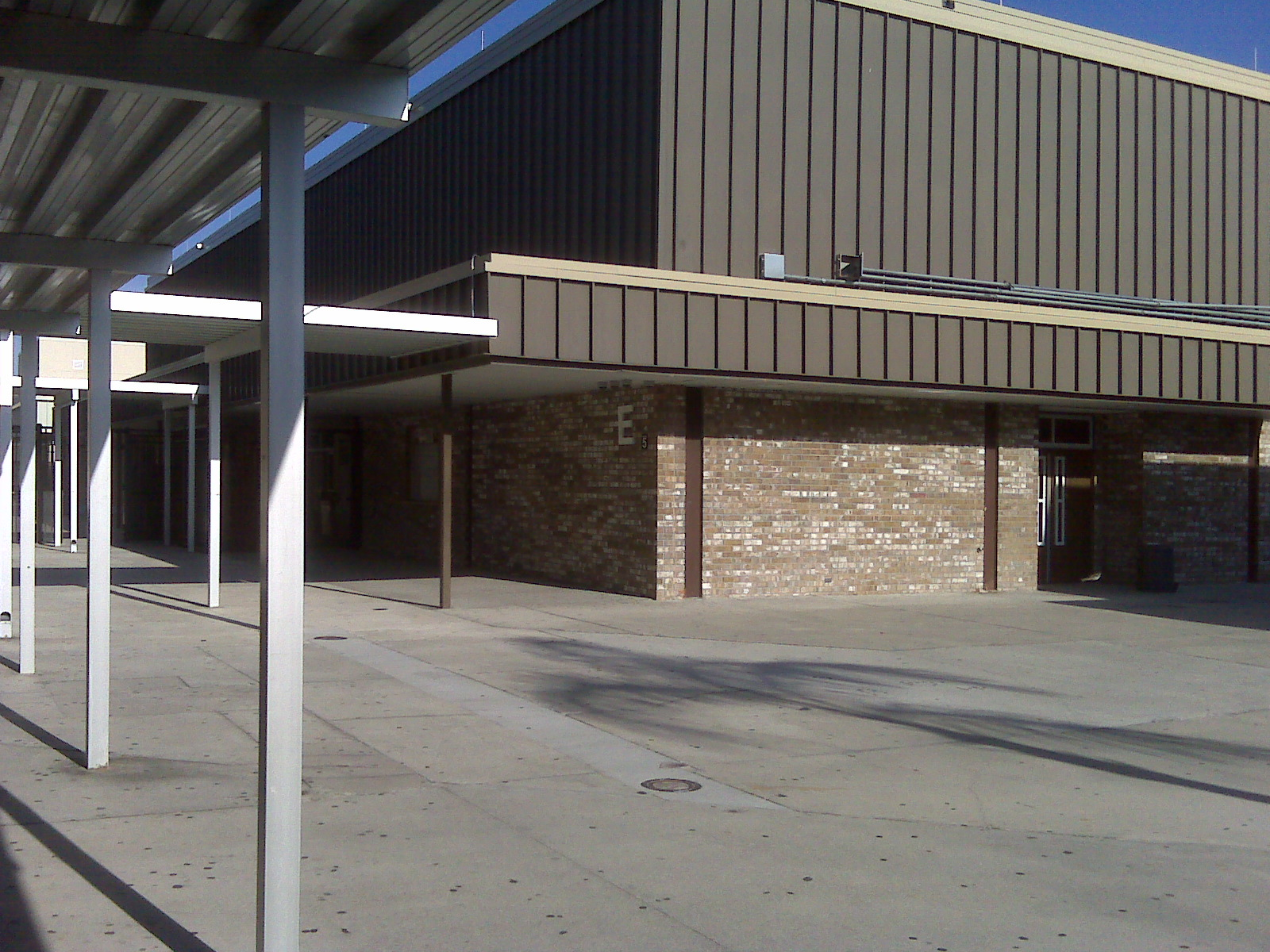
Old gym, original construction from 1981.

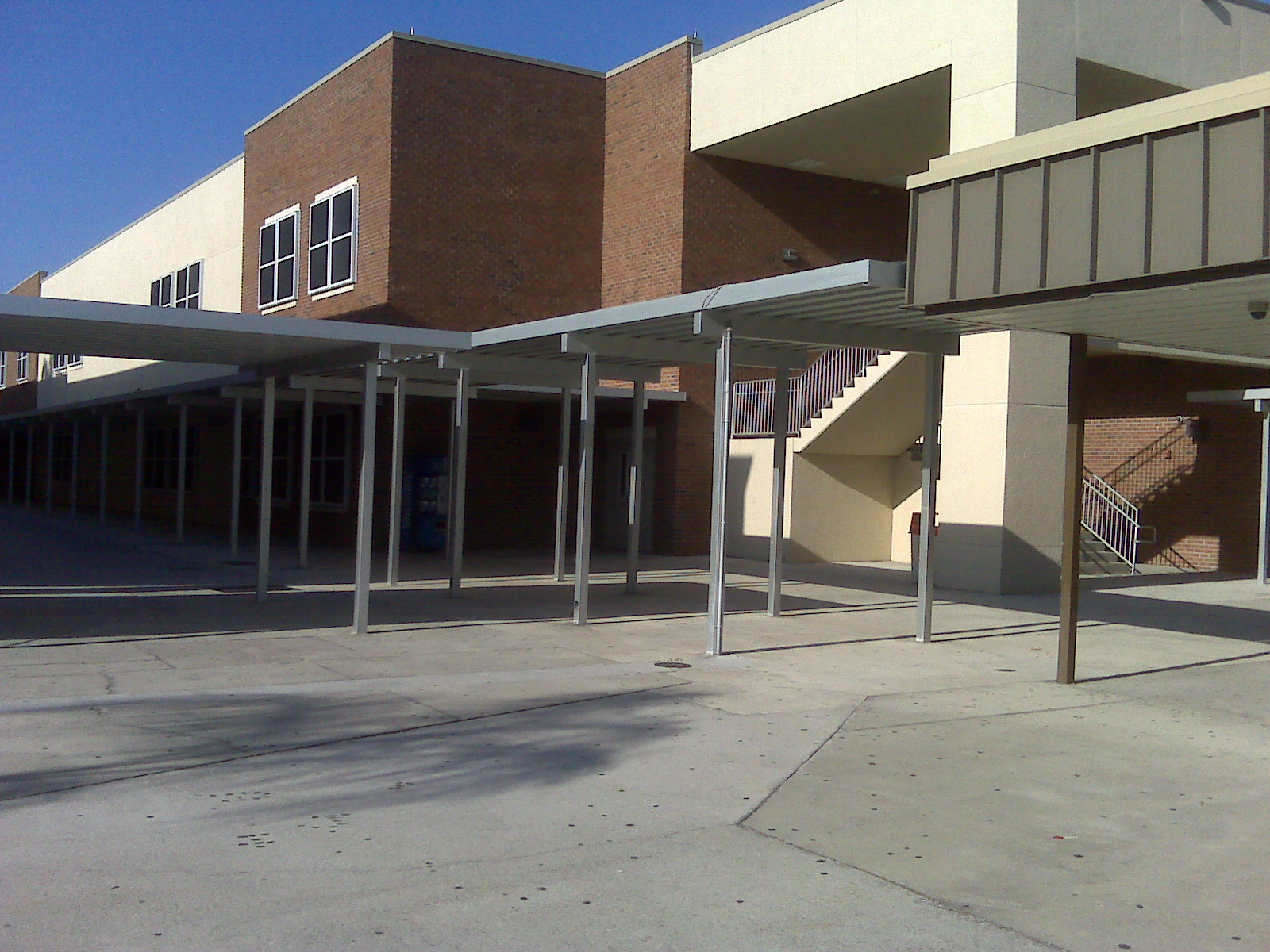
"B" classroom building, finished in 2004

Port Charlotte High School is located in Murdock, adjacent to the Port Charlotte Town Center mall, the Murdock Circle Apartment Complex, and Charlotte Technical College. Its campus consists of multiple brick-and-concrete buildings constructed between 1981 and 2007, connected by paved walkways, along with some "relocatable" classrooms.

In 1996, the school board was discussing increasing student capacity to 2,315. Major campus renovations took place in the late 1990s and early 2000s, largely defining the campus as it is today. Plans were presented to the school board in 1998 by Jeff Cobble of Harvard Jolly Clees Toppe Architects of St. Petersburg to redesign the 1980s-era campus. Original plans for the modern-style redesigned campus included buildings modeled on improvements already made to Charlotte and Lemon Bay High School, as well as renovation of the auditorium, improvements to athletic fields, and a paved thoroughfare intended to give a "main street atmosphere". The renovations were planned in four phases and had a multimillion-dollar budget. Pirate Park, an open courtyard in the middle of the campus, was reduced to make way for the improvements.

A 1999 survey recommended that the original media center library be demolished and replaced with a new one. Demolition began that year to make way for the new two-story media "C" building, a modern building envisioned as a technology and technical center on campus and includes an updated media center with a larger common area than the original one, the Pirate TV production lab, technology labs, and numerous classrooms featuring classes in art, world languages, and information technology. Construction was delayed due to issues the school district had with contractors, including the first contractor being fired and replaced for allegedly using "unlicensed workers," but the "C" building was finished in 2001. Some staff and students were critical of the changes at the time of construction, with complaints about ongoing noise during the school day and changes to Pirate Park. Covered walkways were completed in 2002, and the two-story "B" classroom building was completed in 2004. The new Champ's Cafe was completed in 2001. In 2003, the new "B building", the two-story academic classroom building, was finished. The most recently completed structure is the new gym, construction of which concluded in 2007. The new gym did not replace the older one, but rather, was an addition.

The school's athletic fields have been improved numerous times since 1981. The football field, track, and soccer fields were revamped in 2000 as part of the campus refresh, following a design produced by Harvard Jolly Clees Toppe Architects, with a total cost then estimated at $770,000.

== Governance ==
Port Charlotte High School is a public school supported by public funds, as defined by Florida Statute 1003.01. It is owned and operated by the Charlotte County School Board, a non-partisan five-member panel of officials elected by the citizens of Charlotte County responsible for controlling and organizing public schools within the county. The school is operated through funding appropriated by the District School Board of Charlotte County, which is in turn funded through local taxation and appropriations from the state and federal government. The local school board operates the school in accordance with the requirements and guidelines set forth by the Florida Constitution and Florida State Statutes, with some programs, such as Champ's Cafe (under the National School Lunch Program) and NJROTC, falling under United States federal jurisdiction.

== School structure ==
PCHS Pirate Pride poster seen on the walls throughout the PCHS campus as well as on the back of the PCHS Student Planner. Pirate P-R-I-D-E is "Preparation, Respect, Integrity, Determination, and Excellence."

Students are grouped by grade level: freshmen (ninth grade), sophomores (tenth grade), juniors (eleventh grade), and seniors (twelfth grade). As of 2009, students had a seven period academic day, five days per week, 180 days per year. The school year starts in August and concludes in May or June every year, based on the district-wide school calendar developed by the Charlotte County School Board, and is divided into two semesters. Grades are reported for credit every nine weeks, and semesters are 16 weeks long. As of the 2023–2024 school year, PCHS had an average class size of 20. The maximum class size for core curriculum class at a high school in Florida is 25 per Florida Statute 1003.03 1(c).

As of 2025, Port Charlotte High School's leadership consisted of one principal and three assistant principals.

The school previously published The Pirate Page in local newspapers from Sun Coast Media Group, a student-produced publication covering school-related news.

=== Demographics ===
As of the 2023–24 school year, Port Charlotte High School hosted 1,659 students. Of the student body, 911 were male, and 748 were female. 410 were in ninth grade, 478 were in tenth grade, 420 were in eleventh grade, and 351 were in twelfth grade. 888 students were white, 406 were Hispanic, 197 were black, 120 were "two or more races," 35 were Asian, 12 were Native Hawaiian or Pacific Islander, and 1 was American Indian or Alaska Native.

== Admissions ==
Port Charlotte High School is part of Charlotte County's system of open enrollment, which was already in place when the school was founded, under which students are assigned a to a traditional public school based on location, but may apply to attend a different one. Parents may request a change of school for their already enrolled student in February. Except for some students with an Individualized Educational Plan, students relying on transportation by school bus may only attend Port Charlotte High School if they reside within its geographic boundaries. Geographic boundaries for all schools are posted on the school district's website.

As of 2025, Port Charlotte High School's assigned area boundaries run from near the intersection of Kings Highway and Kingsway Circle, westward along the DeSoto and Sarasota County lines, to the end of Chancellor Blvd at the Myakka River. The boundary continues southward to the tip of El Jobean, eastward to the waterway near Carlisle Avenue NW, and north along the waterway to Tamiami Trail. From the point, the boundary continues southeast along Tamiami Trail to a waterway between Harbor Boulevard and Normandy Drive. The boundary continues north along the waterway to its intersection with Midway Boulevard and continues east to Kings Highway, and northeast along Kings Highway to Kingsway Circle. High school students residing in all of El Jobean, all of Murdock, and much of Port Charlotte are assigned to the school by default.

== Curriculum ==
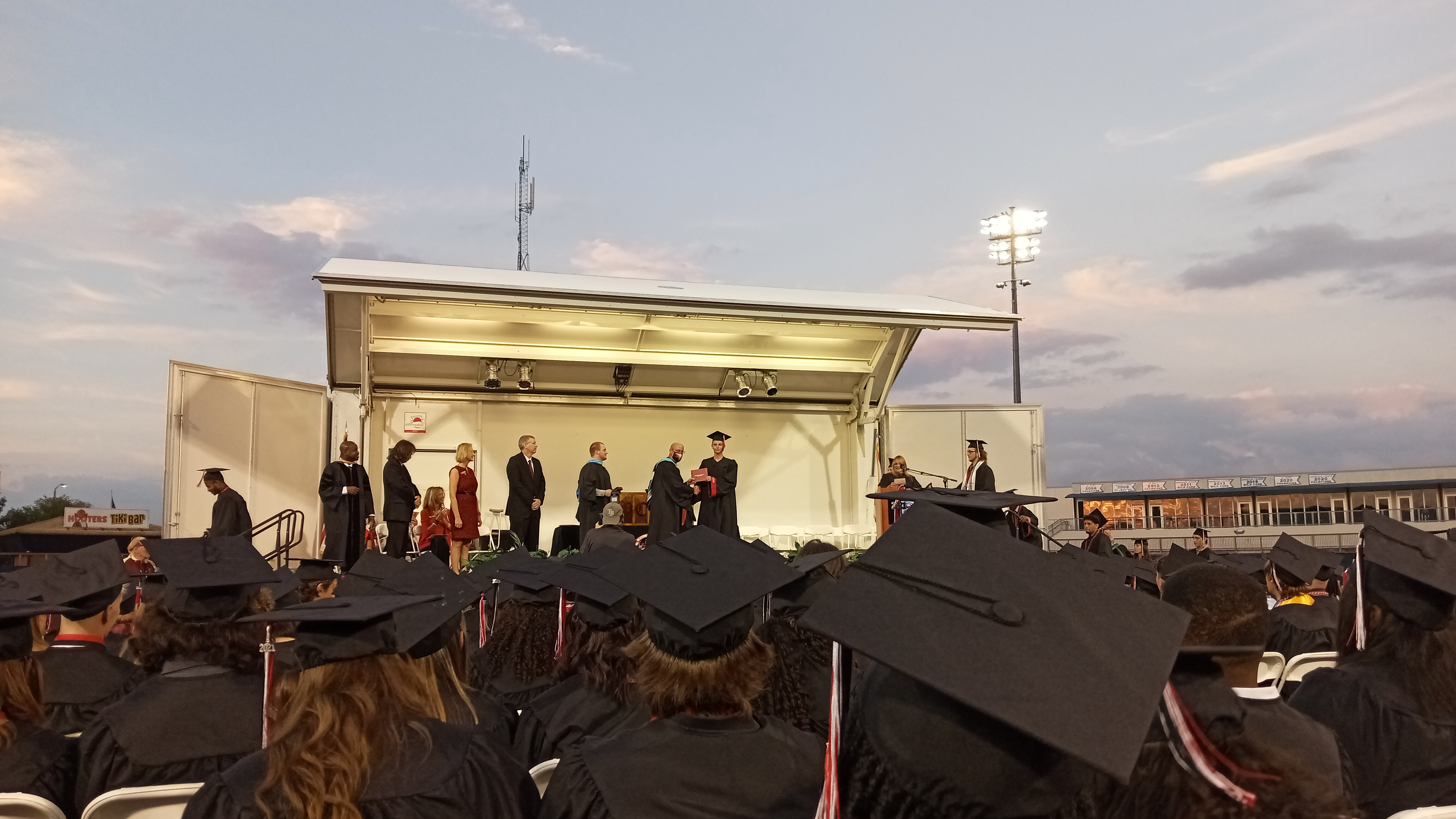
Port Charlotte High School's 2020–2021 school year graduation at Charlotte Sports Park

As a public school, Port Charlotte High School uses a curriculum prescribed by the Florida Department of Education and the Charlotte County School Board, which is regulated under Part IV of Florida Statutes, Chapter 1003. Specifically, the curriculum follows the high school student progression plan set forth by the school board. Dual-enrollment is offered in partnership with Florida Southwestern State College and Charlotte Technical College, with the latter providing training in automotive mechanics, culinary arts, construction, and early childhood education, among other fields. Port Charlotte High School participates in the Cambridge AICE program and the College Board's Advanced Placement program, and the school maintains a department dedicated to the special needs of exceptional students. Curriculum has historically followed an emphasis of "Focus on Their Future".

Port Charlotte High School participates in Florida's standardized testing and is rated by the state annually.

Port Charlotte High School Accountability Report
School Year	School Grade	School Year	School Grade
1999–2000	C	2012–2013	A
2000–2001	C	2013–2014	B
2001–2002	A	2014–2015	B
2002–2003	C	2015–2016	C
2003–2004	C	2016–2017	C
2004–2005	C	2017–2018	B
2005–2006	B	2018–2019	C
2006–2007	C	2019–2020 (Note: Not calculated due to the COVID-19 pandemic interrupting the school year.)	—N/a
2007–2008	A	2020–2021	C
2008–2009	A	2021–2022	C
2009–2010	B	2022–2023	B
2010–2011	C	2023–2024	C
2011–2012	A	2024–2025	C

== Extracurricular activities ==
=== Athletics ===
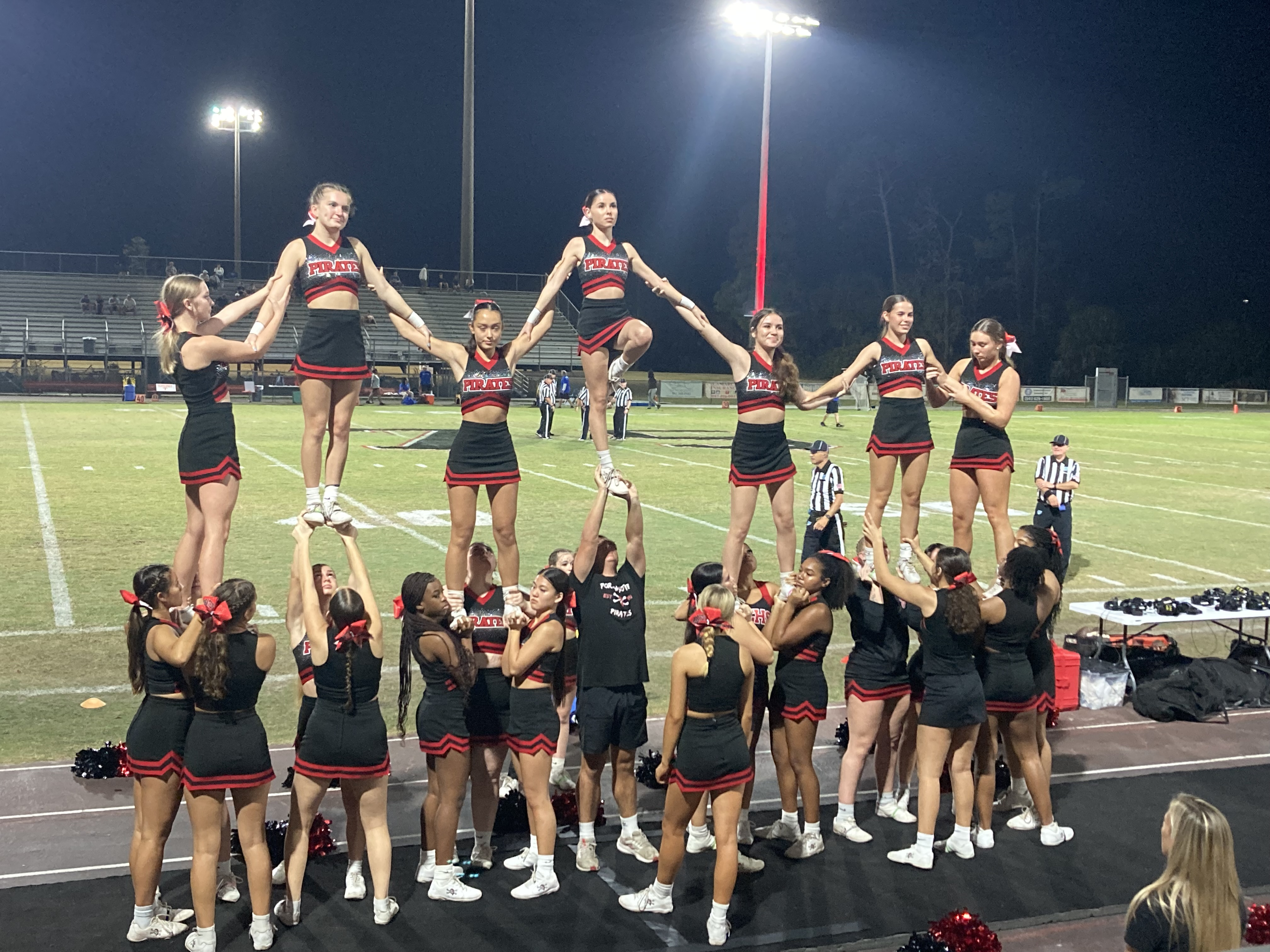
PCHS cheerleaders at a football game

The PCHS athletic department operates programs in football, basketball, baseball, softball, track, cheerleading, golf, wrestling, soccer, volleyball, bowling, swimming, lacrosse, diving, cross country running, and weightlifting, and tennis. Athletics at PCHS are regulated by the Florida High School Athletic Association under classification 5A, district 11 (as of 2025).

The Charlotte Tarpons have long been known Pirates' cross-river rival, with the annual varsity football game between the two teams being known as the Battle of the Peace River, or the Peace River Classic, named after the Peace River which separates Port Charlotte High School from Charlotte High School in Punta Gorda. The rivalry began in 1982, when the Tarpons defeated the Pirates 42–0 in their first meeting. From the school's founding in the 1980s to the 2010s, the Tarpons proved to be a formidable opponent in football, with the Englewood Sun noting in 2003 that the rivalry had "been one-sided for longer than many of Friday's participants have been alive" As of 2021, the Tarpons had a 36–5 advantage over the Pirates over the entire course of Port Charlotte High's existence. However, a 2024 article in the Charlotte Sun notes a sharp reversal in trend, in which Port Charlotte is said to have "bigger fish to fry" than the Tarpons after the "Pirates plunder Tarpons". In 2025, MaxPreps noted that "Port Charlotte skates past Charlotte with ease," covering the team's 35–7 victory, with another article noting it is the Pirates' fourth win in a row against their cross-river rival.

The Pirate football team played in regional playoffs in 1998, 1999, 2002, 2011, 2013, 2015, 2016, 2017, 2019, 2022, and 2023. The Pirates won their first regional championship on November 28, 2025. Individuals from Port Charlotte High achieved state championship in boys cross country in 1994 (class 5A) and 1999 (class 3A). The Pirate volleyball team was runner up for state champion in 1988. The Pirates were runner up for state champion in girls' weightlifting in 2007, 2015, and 2021, with individuals Michelle Athlerley, Shannon Gribben, Katie Ryuk, and Tara Yount from Port Charlotte achieving state champion titles in 2015, 2006, and 2021, respectively. The boys' and girls' basketball and soccer teams have advanced to regional playoffs on multiple occasions, but they have not achieved a championship title.

=== Clubs and organizations ===
Port Charlotte High School hosts numerous student- and staff-sponsored clubs and organizations. As of 2025, there were 25 officially recognized clubs at the school. Some of the school's clubs and organizations have received awards and recognition in their own right.

==== Model United Nations ====
The school's Model United Nations has been recognized for its performances at conferences at both the national and international levels.

Team members host an annual Mini-Mun conference for students from local public and private middle schools. They also present six-week-long public-speaking and debate seminars at several local elementary schools. The seminars culminate in a public debate between teams from the elementary schools.

==== Naval Junior Reserve Officers' Training Corps ====
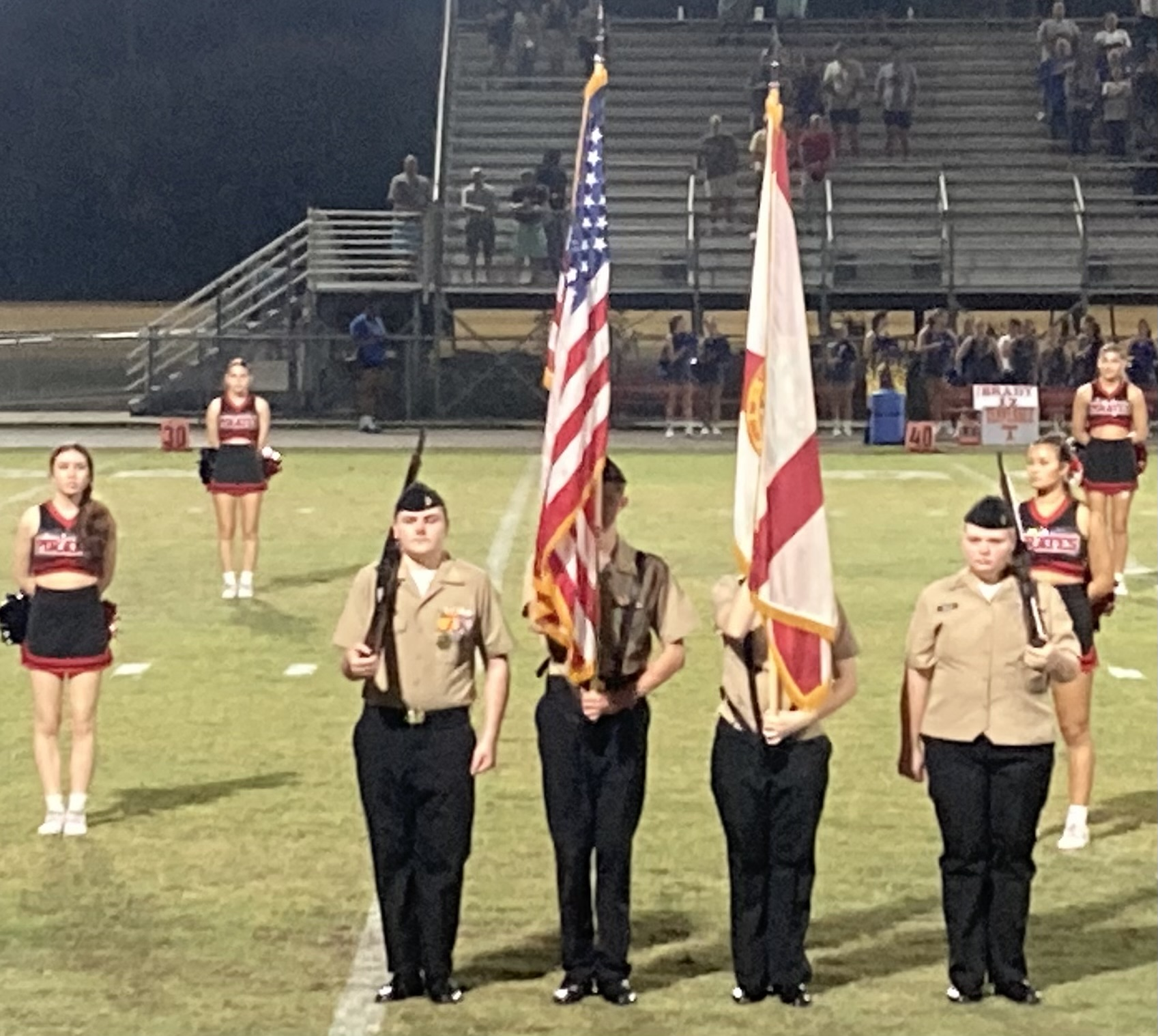
NJROTC Color Guard just before the performance of the national anthem at a football game, flanked by cheerleaders.

The Naval Junior Reserve Officers' Training Corps (NJROTC) is a program that allows high school students to participate in the academic and physical training aspects of naval service, while also providing leadership opportunities for those involved. It does not require a commitment to military service following high school graduation. The company of cadets are overseen and instructed by two retired United States Navy personnel, who are in turn overseen by the United States Navy itself through the form of Area Managers. Port Charlotte's unit is a member of NJROTC Area Seven, and is known for service to its community.

The Pirate NJROTC unit has received many awards over the years, including, but not limited to the Distinguished Unit Award, which it has been awarded over seven consecutive academic years - 2001–2007. The unit is a part of Area 7, which consists of units in Alabama, Florida, and Georgia.

The unit has seven "teams" within its infrastructure that allow participating cadets to receive extracurricular training and experience of their choice: an armed and unarmed drill team, color guard, honor guard, academic team, orienteering team, marksmanship team and a physical training ("PT") team. The teams compete against other Area Seven units at colleges, universities, military installations, and other high schools. The teams also compete with other units across the United States.

==== Pride of Port Charlotte Bands ====
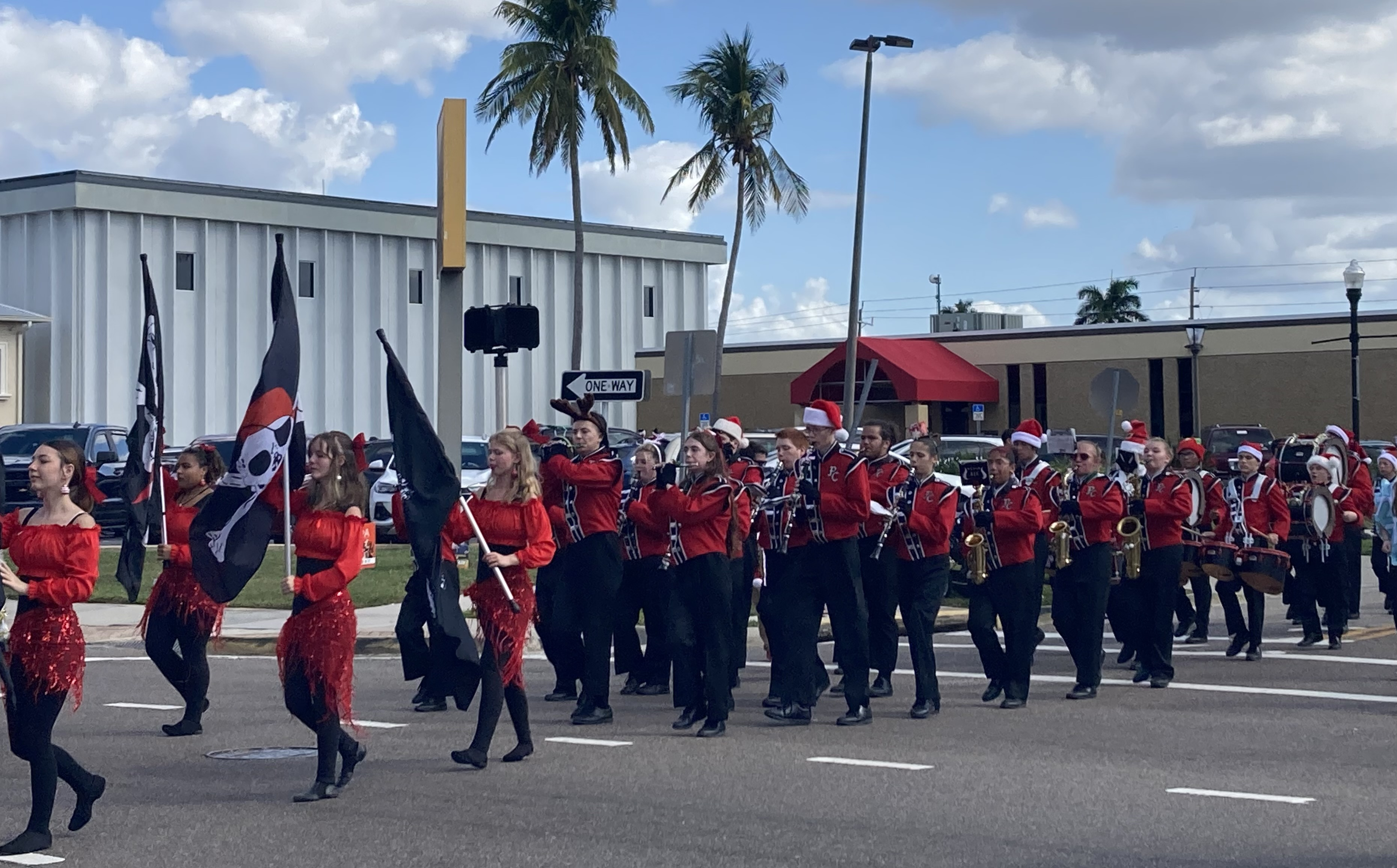
The Pride of Port Charlotte Marching Band performing in a Christmas parade in downtown Punta Gorda

Port Charlotte High School's "Pride of Port Charlotte" Bands have a history of ranking among the top bands in the state of Florida. In 2000, the competitive marching band won first place at the Southern Showcase of Champions Marching Festival in Gainesville, Florida. The Pride of Port Charlotte Marching Band has participated at many famous events, such as the Fiesta Bowl, the Macy's Thanksgiving Day Parade and Saint Patrick's Day Parade in New York City, the New Year's Day parade in London, England, and the Cotton Bowl Parade in Dallas, Texas among many others. The pride concert and jazz bands are also extremely successful, consistently receiving superior ratings from the Florida Bandmasters Association.

== Awards and recognition ==
In 2009, Port Charlotte High School was recognized by U.S. News & World Report as a "Bronze Medal School" for academic excellence. PCHS was one of 1,189 schools nationwide to receive a bronze medal.

=== Teacher and staff awards ===
Algebra teacher Nancy Kenneally, who taught at Port Charlotte High since its opening in 1981, received a Presidential Award for Excellence in Science, Mathematics, and Engineering Mentoring for the state of Florida in 1998, 1999, and 2000, and received the award nationally in 2001. Michelle Kasanofsky was awarded a Shine Award by governor Rick Scott and was named Charlotte County teacher of the year in 2013.

== Notable people ==
=== Alumni ===
- Kim Pawelek Brantly, middle and long-distance runner
- Vinnie Fiorello, drummer and lyricist who co-founded Less Than Jake and Fueled by Ramen
- John Hall, football player
- Anthony Hargrove, football player
- David Holmberg, baseball player
- Matt LaPorta (transferred), baseball player and 2008 Olympian
- Asher Levine, fashion designer and business owner
- T. J. Luther, football player

=== Faculty ===
- Bob Burke, college football coach and player who served as an assistant coach to the football team
- Doug Dunakey, professional golfer who coached the golf team after retirement
- Mark Ivey, college football coach and player who previously coached the offensive and defensive line of the football team
- Pat Stewart, college football coach and player who worked as a defensive coordinator
