= Asher Levine =

American fashion designer

- Born: March 12, 1988 (age 38)
- Education: Pace University
- Website: asherlevine.com

Asher Levine (born March 12, 1988) is an American fashion designer. He is the designer for his eponymous progressive label, Asher Levine.

== Early life and education ==
Levine was raised in Port Charlotte, Florida, where he began sewing at the age of 10 and attended Port Charlotte High School. While a student at Port Charlotte, Levine led the school's gay-straight alliance club. However, when protestors from Westboro Baptist Church in Topeka, Kansas came to the school in 2005, he failed to rally support for the club from the majority of the student body and some students even mocked the club. Shortly after he graduated from PCHS in 2006, Levine got on a plane and moved to New York City to attend Pace University where he experimented with design in the underground avant-garde nightlife scene. He graduated from the university in 2010 with a degree in 'Business Management and Entrepreneurship.'

== Career ==
Shortly before graduation, he founded his label.

Levine is best known for designing and fabricating custom garments worn by the Black Eyed Peas, Will.i.am, Bruno Mars, Whoopi Goldberg, Scissor Sisters, Sam Sparro, Dangerous Muse, Adam Lambert, Johnny Weir, La Roux, Cazwell, Peaches, Rita Ora, comedian Caroline Reid's aka “Pam Ann”, Jim Steinman, and - Taylor Swift - for her record-breaking Bad Blood Music Video. Swift's video, which debuted at the 2015 Billboard Music Awards, attracted over 1 Billion Views on Vevo.com, YouTube, Xbox, Roku, and other Vevo platforms. The designer has also worked with Lady Gaga. on several occasions, including for her "Marry the Night music video.

Though custom designs have formed the foundation of the label's notoriety, his debut women's and mainline menswear collection have begun to garner attention of its own. Levine's earlier designs were featured in the November 2011 issue of Vogue Italia, photographed by Emma Summerton and styled by legendary stylist, Patti Wilson. His designs have also been featured in major publications such as i-D, Numéro, Interview Magazine, L'Uomo Vogue, Vogue and Rolling Stone.

For his latest collection, Levine utilized draped boiled wools, molded leather scales and accessories, exotic furs, and laser cut crepe silks that encompass his perspective on fashion. Most of Levine’s work focuses on made to measure and local manufacturing. Asher Levine is known for incorporating technology within clothing, but this is the first time he enhances the manufacturing process with intelligent optical measurement software.

His collections exhibit various methods of molding and casting to construct various items in the collection. These innovations can be seen in the three-dimensional hounds tooth printed moto-jacket. The raised print was created by enlarging the relief carving of a traditional houndstooth print onto a rubberized material slab to generate yards of silicone fabric. The final result is a reinterpretation and marriage of the classic motorcycle jacket with a new take on the traditional houndstooth print. He demonstrated his talent for combining fashion and technological innovation by collaborating with MakerBot Industries, the leading innovator of 3D printing. The partnership led to the first-ever pair of 3D printed sunglasses for the collection leading to CNN writer Laurie Segall calling it “the hottest accessory on the runway at [New York] Fashion Week”. Besides ceaselessly creating and pushing the boundaries of modern fashion, Levine has also been a guest lecturer at higher education institutions such as Stanford University, Fashion Institute of Technology, and Pace University.
