= T. J. Luther =

American football player (born 2000)

No. 88 – Edmonton Elks
- Position: Wide receiver
- Roster status: 6-game injured list
- CFL status: American

Personal information
- Born: May 13, 2000 (age 26); Arcadia, Florida, U.S.
- Listed height: 5 ft 11 in (1.80 m)
- Listed weight: 189 lb (86 kg)

Career information
- High school: Port Charlotte (Port Charlotte, Florida)
- College: Wofford (2018–2020); Gardner–Webb (2021–2022)
- NFL draft: 2023: undrafted

Career history
- New York Jets (2023)*; New England Patriots (2023–2024)*; Pittsburgh Steelers (2024)*; Green Bay Packers (2024)*; Carolina Panthers (2024)*; Edmonton Elks (2025–present)
- * Offseason or practice squad member only

Awards and highlights
- Grey Cup champion (2026); First-team All-Big South (2022)
- Stats at Pro Football Reference

Tyreece "T. J." Luther (born May 13, 2000) is an American professional football wide receiver for the Edmonton Elks of the Canadian Football League (CFL). He played college football for the Wofford Terriers and Gardner–Webb Bulldogs.

== Early life ==
Luther grew up in Arcadia, Florida and attended Port Charlotte High School where he lettered in football and track & field. During high school, he was a four-year starter and as a senior, he had 724 receiving yards and 16 touchdowns, along with 262 rushing yards and six touchdowns. He later committed to play college football at Wofford.

== College career ==
=== Wofford ===
During Luther's true freshman season in 2018, he played in all 13 games and started one at wide receiver. He finished the season with 14 receptions for 323 yards and four touchdowns along with three rushes for 51 yards and eight kickoff returns for 189 yards. During the 2019 season, he played in ten games and started in seven of them. He finished the season with 447 receiving yards and three touchdowns on 19 catches along with 45 rushing yards on ten carries and 357 yards on 14 kickoff returns. During the 2020-21 season, he played in and started four games before he opted out and finished the season with six catches for 108 yards and a touchdown along with 179 kickoff return yards.

On April 2, 2021, after the season ended, Luther announced that he was entering the transfer portal. He ultimately transferred to Gardner–Webb.

=== Gardner–Webb ===
During the 2021 season, Luther played in and started seven games as the team's primary kickoff return man. He finished the season with 23 caught passes for 384 yards and four touchdowns averaging in 16.7 yards per catch and returned seven kickoffs for 179 yards. During the 2022 season, he played in 12 games and started two of them. He finished the season with 55 receptions for 1,035 yards and seven touchdowns.

== Professional career ==
Pre-draft measurables
Height	Weight	Arm length	Hand span	Wingspan	40-yard dash	10-yard split	20-yard split	20-yard shuttle	Three-cone drill	Vertical jump	Broad jump	Bench press
5 ft 11 1/4 in (1.81 m)	189 lb (86 kg)	30 7/8 in (0.78 m)	9 3/8 in (0.24 m)	6 ft 3 3/8 in (1.91 m)	4.50 s	1.63 s	2.53 s	4.40 s	7.39 s	39.0 in (0.99 m)	10 ft 7 in (3.23 m)	14 reps
All values from Pro Day

=== New York Jets ===
On April 29, 2023, Luther signed with the New York Jets as an undrafted free agent after going unselected in the 2023 NFL draft. Luther was released on August 29.

=== New England Patriots ===
On September 1, 2023, Luther was signed to the New England Patriots practice squad. The Patriots released him on October 18. Luther was re-signed to the Patriots' practice squad on November 7. He signed a reserve/future contract on January 8, 2024, but was released on June 6.

=== Pittsburgh Steelers ===
On August 14, 2024, Luther signed with the Pittsburgh Steelers. He was waived on August 26.

=== Green Bay Packers ===
Luther was signed by the Green Bay Packers to their practice squad on September 10, 2024. He was released by Green Bay on October 19.

=== Carolina Panthers ===
On December 3, 2024, Luther was signed to the Carolina Panthers practice squad. He signed a reserve/future contract with Carolina on January 6, 2025. On August 25, Luther was waived by the Panthers.
