= Kevin Turco =

American football coach (born c. 1976)

Biographical details
- Born: c. 1976 (age 49–50)
- Education: Western New England College (1998); University of Saint Mary

Playing career
- 1994–1995: Western New England
- Position: Quarterback

Coaching career (HC unless noted)
- 1999: Westfield HS (MA) (DL)
- 2000–2001: Western New England (ST/DL)
- 2002–2003: Saint Mary (KS) (DL)
- 2004 (spring): Saint Peter's (DL)
- 2004: South Carolina (GA)
- 2005: East Carolina (GA)
- 2006: Newberry (DL)
- 2007–2010: Newberry (OL)
- 2010 (spring): Miami Dolphins (intern)
- 2011–2013: NW Oklahoma State (AHC/OL)
- 2014: NW Oklahoma State (AHC/OC/OL)
- 2014: NW Oklahoma State (interim HC)
- 2015–2016: Urbana (AHC/OL)
- 2017–2018: Lindenwood–Belleville

Head coaching record
- Overall: 3–20

Kevin Turco (born c. 1976) is an American former college football coach. He was the head football coach for Northwestern Oklahoma State University in 2014 and Lindenwood University – Belleville from 2017 to 2018. He also coached for Westfield High School, Western New England, Saint Mary (KS), Saint Peter's, South Carolina, East Carolina, Newberry, Urbana, and the Miami Dolphins of the National Football League (NFL). He played college football for Western New England as a quarterback.

== Head coaching record ==
| Year | Team | Overall | Conference | Standing |
|---|---|---|---|---|
Northwestern Oklahoma State Rangers (Great American Conference) (2014)
| 2014 | Northwestern Oklahoma State | 3–6 (Note: Turco was named interim head coach with nine weeks remaining in the season following the resignation of Alan Hall.) | 3–6 | T–7th |
| Northwestern Oklahoma State: | | 3–6 | 3–6 | |
Lindenwood–Belleville Lynx (Mid-States Football Association) (2017–2018)
| 2017 | Lindenwood–Belleville | 0–10 | 0–6 | 7th (MEL) |
| 2018 | Lindenwood–Belleville | 0–4 (Note: Turco was fired with seven weeks remaining in the season, Pat Stewart was named interim head coach, and Lindenwood–Belleville finished the season 0–11.) | 0–0 | N/A |
| Lindenwood–Belleville: | | 0–14 | 0–6 | |
| Total: | | 3–20 | | |
