= Anthony Hargrove =

American football player (born 1983)

No. 95, 93, 69, 94
- Position: Defensive end

Personal information
- Born: July 20, 1983 (age 43); Brooklyn, New York, U.S.
- Listed height: 6 ft 3 in (1.91 m)
- Listed weight: 282 lb (128 kg)

Career information
- High school: Port Charlotte (FL)
- College: Georgia Tech
- NFL draft: 2004: 3rd round, 91st overall pick

Career history
- St. Louis Rams (2004–2006); Buffalo Bills (2006–2007); New Orleans Saints (2009–2010); Philadelphia Eagles (2011)*; Seattle Seahawks (2011); Green Bay Packers (2012)*; Dallas Cowboys (2013)*
- * Offseason or practice squad member only

Awards and highlights
- Super Bowl champion (XLIV); Sporting News ACC All-Freshman (2001)

Career NFL statistics
- Total tackles: 168
- Sacks: 19.5
- Forced fumbles: 4
- Fumble recoveries: 5
- Defensive touchdowns: 1
- Stats at Pro Football Reference

Anthony La'Ron Hargrove (born July 20, 1983) is an American former professional football player who was a defensive end in the National Football League (NFL). He was selected by the St. Louis Rams in the third round of the 2004 NFL draft. He played college football for the Georgia Tech Yellow Jackets.

Hargrove also played for the Buffalo Bills as well as winning Super Bowl XLIV with the New Orleans Saints, beating Peyton Manning and the Indianapolis Colts. He was also a member of the Philadelphia Eagles and Seattle Seahawks in 2011, and Green Bay Packers in 2012.

== Early life ==
Hargrove played high school football at Port Charlotte High School in Florida. He played quarterback and free safety for the Pirates, before moving to defensive line in college.

== College career ==
Hargrove started 13 of 24 games for the Georgia Tech Yellow Jackets, with 70 tackles (36 solo) with six sacks, 19 tackles for loss, two forced fumbles, two fumble recoveries, and three passes defensed. He was academically ineligible for the season as a junior in 2003, but started every game at weakside defensive end as a sophomore.

== Professional career ==
=== St. Louis Rams ===
Hargrove was selected in the third round (91st overall) by the St. Louis Rams. On July 24, 2004, Hargrove signed a three-year $1.25 million contract with the Rams, including a signing bonus of $442,000. As a reserve in 2004, Hargrove played in 15 games and started two. He totaled 31 tackles (23 solo) and recorded one sack. In 2005, he was the Rams starting right defensive end, totaling 51 tackles (43 solo) and 6.5 sacks. In 2006, he played in four games with two starts and had five tackles and one-half sack. Early in the 2006 season Hargrove had an unexplained two-day absence which caused him to be made inactive and then traded.

=== Buffalo Bills ===
Hargrove was traded by the Rams to the Buffalo Bills on October 16, 2006, in exchange for a fifth-round pick in the 2007 NFL draft. Hargrove played in 10 games in 2006 and had 19 tackles (14 solo) and recorded a sack to make his 2006 totals 24 tackles and 1.5 sacks with both the Bills and Rams. On March 1, 2007, Hargrove signed the Bills' one-year tender of $850,000 for the 2007 season. In 2007, he played 12 games and made 28 tackles (18 solo) and had 1.5 sacks after serving a four-game suspension, which cost him $200,000 of his 2007 salary.

On August 11, 2007, Hargrove was suspended by the NFL for the first four games of the regular season for breaking the NFL's substance abuse policy. It was reported on January 18, 2008, that Hargrove had failed another drug test. Due to past violations of the NFL's substance abuse policy, Hargrove received a one-year suspension on January 24, 2008. It was announced he had been reinstated by the league on February 23, 2009.

=== New Orleans Saints ===
On May 18, 2009, Hargrove signed a contract with the New Orleans Saints. New Orleans Saints defensive coordinator Gregg Williams moved Hargrove inside to defensive tackle where he flourished.

On November 8 of the same year Hargrove validated the Saints' decision by recovering a fumble from the Carolina Panthers and scoring a 4th-quarter touchdown, sealing a 30–20 victory for the Saints. Besides the rare occurrence of a touchdown scored by a defensive lineman, the game was Panthers coach John Fox's first loss in the Louisiana Superdome and put New Orleans at a season-starting eight wins and no losses for the first time in Saints history.

Hargrove was a restricted free agent after the 2009 season, and it was reported that the Detroit Lions were interesting in signing him, but on April 5, 2010, Hargrove signed the Saints' qualifying tender, and the Saints said he would return to the team in 2010.

While a player for the Saints, Hargrove is alleged to have been involved in a bounty program where coaches offered extra payments to defensive players who injured or otherwise knocked key offensive players out of the game. Hargrove faced an eight-game suspension in conjunction with the scandal, and was alleged to have told NFL officials that Saints coaches had instructed players to lie to league officials about the existence of the program.

=== Philadelphia Eagles ===
The Philadelphia Eagles signed Hargrove on August 3, 2011. He was released during final roster cuts on September 3.

=== Seattle Seahawks ===
The Seattle Seahawks signed Hargrove on September 9, 2011.

On December 18, 2011, during a game against the Chicago Bears, wide receiver Johnny Knox sustained a serious back injury after attempting to recover his own fumble and awkwardly colliding with Hargrove. Knox required immediate surgery in order to stabilize an injured vertebra. The injury forced him to retire from the NFL.

=== Green Bay Packers ===
The Green Bay Packers signed Hargrove on March 29, 2012.

On May 2, 2012, the NFL suspended Hargrove for the first eight games of the 2012 season after naming him as one of the ringleaders of the New Orleans Saints bounty scandal. According to the league, Hargrove signed a statement admitting his role in the scheme, and also told at least one other player that the Saints had put a bounty on Brett Favre in the 2009 NFC Championship Game. He'd also lied to investigators when the league initially probed the Saints about the bounty scandal in 2010. Hargrove, along with the other suspended players, intends to appeal. His suspension was later overturned.

Hargrove was released on August 24, 2012.

On October 9, 2012, four weeks and three days after an internal appeals panel vacated suspensions imposed on Hargrove, Saints linebacker Jonathan Vilma, Browns linebacker Scott Fujita and Saints defensive end Will Smith, the league has re-issued the discipline without any changes or reductions, according to a league source. This meant that Vilma was suspended a full season, Fujita was suspended three games, Smith was suspended four games, and Hargrove was suspended eight games.

On December 12, 2012, "In a sharp rebuke to his successor's handling of the NFL's bounty investigation, former commissioner Paul Tagliabue overturned the suspensions of four current and former New Orleans Saints players (including Hargrove) in a case that has preoccupied the league for almost a year."

=== Dallas Cowboys ===
The Dallas Cowboys signed Anthony Hargrove on May 16, 2013. Hargrove was released by the Cowboys on June 20.

== Personal ==
When Hargrove was 6, the Brooklyn tenement where he lived with his mother and two of his four half-siblings burned down. He lived in homeless shelters and foster care until his mother died when he was 9. An aunt in Port Charlotte adopted him.

Hargrove has said that he began abusing drugs during his time with the Rams. He went through a series of failed drug tests and other difficulties during his tenure with the Rams and the Bills. After his 2008 suspension, he spent more than a year in treatment centers in South Carolina and North Miami Beach. Eight months after leaving the treatment center, he found himself back in Miami to play in the Super Bowl. In view of his comeback, Hargrove's Saints teammates voted him the winner of their 2009 Ed Block Courage Award.

In June 2011, Hargrove's older brother Terence Hargrove died after being stabbed numerous times in North Port Florida.

Hargrove's daughter, Amiah, is a Freshman forward on the Nebraska Cornhuskers women's basketball team.

His son, Tre Carroll, was on the FAU Basketball team that went on the run to the Final Four in 2023 NCAA March Madness tournament.

== Current ==
Hargrove has recently joined the MTV Mavericks Special Olympics team as the Speed and Agility trainer. He has also coached with CoachUp.

In June 2016, Hargrove became an assistant coach for the Christopher-Zeigler-Royalton (CZR) team (a cooperative team that represents two high schools in Franklin County, Illinois). In June 2017 he became head coach.

In the spring of 2022, Hargrove was named the defensive line coach at Limestone University in Gaffney, SC, where he is a part of former NFL veteran Mike Furrey's staff.
