= Tre Carroll =

American basketball player (born 2003)

No. 12 – Greensboro Swarm
- Position: Power forward
- League: NBA G League

Personal information
- Born: April 16, 2003 (age 23) Port Charlotte, Florida, U.S.
- Listed height: 6 ft 8 in (2.03 m)
- Listed weight: 233 lb (106 kg)

Career information
- High school: Charlotte (Punta Gorda, Florida)
- College: Florida Atlantic (2021–2025); Xavier (2025–2026)
- NBA draft: 2026: undrafted
- Playing career: 2026–present

Career history
- 2026–present: Greensboro Swarm

Career highlights
- First-team All-Big East (2026); AAC co-Most Improved Player (2025); Second-team All-AAC (2025)
- Stats at Basketball Reference

Tre Anthony Carroll (born April 16, 2003) is an American basketball player for the Greensboro Swarm of the NBA G League. He played college basketball for the Florida Atlantic Owls and Xavier Musketeers.

== Early life and high school career ==
Carroll was born on April 16, 2003, in Punta Gorda, Florida. He grew up in an athletic family; his mother, Tricia, was a 1,000-point scorer at Port Charlotte and Charlotte High Schools and later became a basketball official, while his father, Anthony Hargrove, was a multi-sport athlete who won a Super Bowl with the New Orleans Saints.

Carroll attended Charlotte High School, where he excelled as a power forward, twice earning the Herald-Tribune Boys Basketball Player of the Year award. During AAU season, he played for TeamParsons 17-under National Team.

=== Recruiting ===
Despite offers from multiple schools, Carroll attended Florida Atlantic University to stay close to home.

College recruiting
| Name | Hometown | School | Height | Weight | Commit date |
|---|---|---|---|---|---|
| Tre Carroll; PF | Punta Gorda, FL | Charlotte (FL) | 6 ft 7 in (2.01 m) | 227 lb (103 kg) | Oct 17, 2020 |
| Tre Carroll; PF | Recruit ratings: Rivals: 247Sports: ESPN: (78) | | | | |
Overall recruit ranking: 247Sports: 230
Note: In many cases, Scout, Rivals, 247Sports, On3, and ESPN may conflict in their listings of height and weight.; In these cases, the average was taken. ESPN grades are on a 100-point scale.; Sources: "Florida Atlantic 2021 Basketball Commitments". Rivals.; "2021 Florida Atlantic Owls Recruiting Class". ESPN.; "2023 Team Ranking". Rivals.

== College career ==
=== Florida Atlantic ===
Carroll redshirted his freshman year at FAU in 2021–22. In his redshirt freshman season (2022–23), he was part of FAU's historic run to the 2023 Final Four, averaging 3.4 points in 5.7 minutes per game off the bench. His limited minutes included a season-high 11 points against UTSA, shooting 2-for-2 from three-point range.

In his junior season (2024–25), Carroll appeared in all 34 games with 14 starts, averaging 12.2 points, 5.2 rebounds, and 1.0 blocks per game. He scored a career-high 24 points against FIU and 20 points at Memphis, shooting 38% from three-point range. His performance earned him the 2024–25 AAC Co-Most Improved Player, Amir Abdur-Rahim Sportsmanship Award, and AAC Second Team honors.

Carroll announced an NIL deal with VI Coffee Bar in Boca Raton, on August 14, 2024.

On April 6, 2025, Carroll entered the NCAA transfer portal, citing FAU as his "home away from home."

=== Xavier ===
Carroll committed to Xavier University on April 12, 2025, enrolling at Xavier for his final year of eligibility.

During the 2025-26 season, Carroll led the Musketeers in scoring, becoming the fifth player in school history to be named to the All-Big East first team.

He was selected to the East All-Stars team for the 2026 NABC-Reese's Division I College All-Star Game. He is also preparing for the 2026 NBA draft.

== Professional career ==
On July 3, 2026, it was announced that Carroll received an invitation to the NBA Summer League with the Washington Wizards. On September 22, Carroll signed a training camp contract with the Charlotte Hornets. However, he was waived by Charlotte the same day.

== Personal life ==
Carroll married his childhood best friend, Suron Draden, in August 2025.

== Career statistics ==
Legend
| GP | Games played | GS | Games started | MPG | Minutes per game |
| FG% | Field goal percentage | 3P% | 3-point field goal percentage | FT% | Free throw percentage |
| RPG | Rebounds per game | APG | Assists per game | SPG | Steals per game |
| BPG | Blocks per game | PPG | Points per game | **Bold** | Career high |

=== College ===
| Year | Team | GP | GS | MPG | FG% | 3P% | FT% | RPG | APG | SPG | BPG | PPG |
|---|---|---|---|---|---|---|---|---|---|---|---|---|
| 2022–23 | Florida Atlantic | 18 | 0 | 5.7 | **.641** | **.545** | .750 | 1.8 | .4 | .0 | .1 | 3.4 |
| 2023–24 | Florida Atlantic | 24 | 0 | 7.9 | .493 | .200 | .704 | 1.8 | .4 | .3 | .1 | 4.0 |
| 2024–25 | Florida Atlantic | **34** | 14 | 22.1 | .523 | .388 | **.755** | 5.2 | 1.6 | **.8** | 1.0 | 12.2 |
| 2025–26 | Xavier | 32 | **32** | **31.6** | .501 | .333 | .709 | **5.8** | **2.6** | **.8** | **1.3** | **17.8** |
| Career | | 108 | 46 | 19.0 | .515 | .345 | .728 | 4.0 | 1.4 | .5 | .7 | 10.6 |
