= Pat Stewart (American football) =

American football coach (born c. 1967)

Biographical details
- Born: c. 1967 (age 58–59); Colorado Springs, Colorado, U.S.
- Education: Western State University (1990, 1992); University of Northern Colorado (1996)

Playing career
- 1985–1988: Western State (CO)
- Position: Linebacker

Coaching career (HC unless noted)
- 1989–1993: Western State (CO) (LB)
- 1994: Northern Colorado (GA/DL)
- 1995: Port Charlotte HS (FL) (DC)
- 1996–1998: Olivet (AHC/DC)
- 1999–2000: Nebraska–Kearney (LB)
- 2001–2005: Nebraska–Kearney (DC/LB)
- 2006–2010: Western State (CO)
- 2011: Seton Hill (DC)
- 2012–2014: Land o' Lakes HS (FL)
- 2017–2018: Lindenwood–Belleville (DC)
- 2018: Lindenwood–Belleville (interim HC)
- 2019 (spring): Lindenwood–Belleville
- 2020–2022: Lindenwood (LB)

Head coaching record
- Overall: 10–51 (college); 16–14 (high school)

Accomplishments and honors

Awards
- 2× All-RMAC (1987–1988)

Patrick Stewart (born c. 1967) is an American former college football coach. He was the head football coach for Western State University—now known as Western Colorado University—from 2006 to 2010, Land o' Lakes High School from 2012 to 2014, and Lindenwood University – Belleville from 2018 until the program was disbanded in the spring of 2019. He also coached for Northern Colorado, Port Charlotte High School, Olivet, Nebraska–Kearney, Seton Hill, and Lindenwood. He played college football for Western State as a linebacker.

== Head coaching record ==
=== College ===
Year	Team	Overall	Conference	Standing	Bowl/playoffs
Western State Mountaineers (Rocky Mountain Athletic Conference) (2006–2010)
2006	Western State	3–8	2–6	T–8th	
2007	Western State	1–10	0–8	9th	
2008	Western State	2–8	2–7	T–8th	
2009	Western State	3–8	3–6	7th	
2010	Western State	1–10	1–8	T–9th	
Western State:		10–44	8–35		
Lindenwood–Belleville Lynx (Mid-States Football Association) (2018)
2018	Lindenwood–Belleville	0–7 (Note: Stewart was named interim head coach with seven weeks remaining in the season following the firing of Kevin Turco.)	0–6	7th (MEL)	
Lindenwood–Belleville:		0–7	0–6		
Total:		10–51			

=== High school ===
Year	Team	Overall	Conference	Standing	Bowl/playoffs
Land o' Lakes Gators () (2012–2014)
2012	Land o' Lakes	4–6	2–5	6th	
2013	Land o' Lakes	8–2	2–2	3rd	
2014	Land o' Lakes	4–6	1–3	4th	
Land o' Lakes:		16–14	5–10		
Total:		16–14			
