= Brides of Dracula =

Characters in Bram Stoker's 1897 novel Dracula

- Dracula character
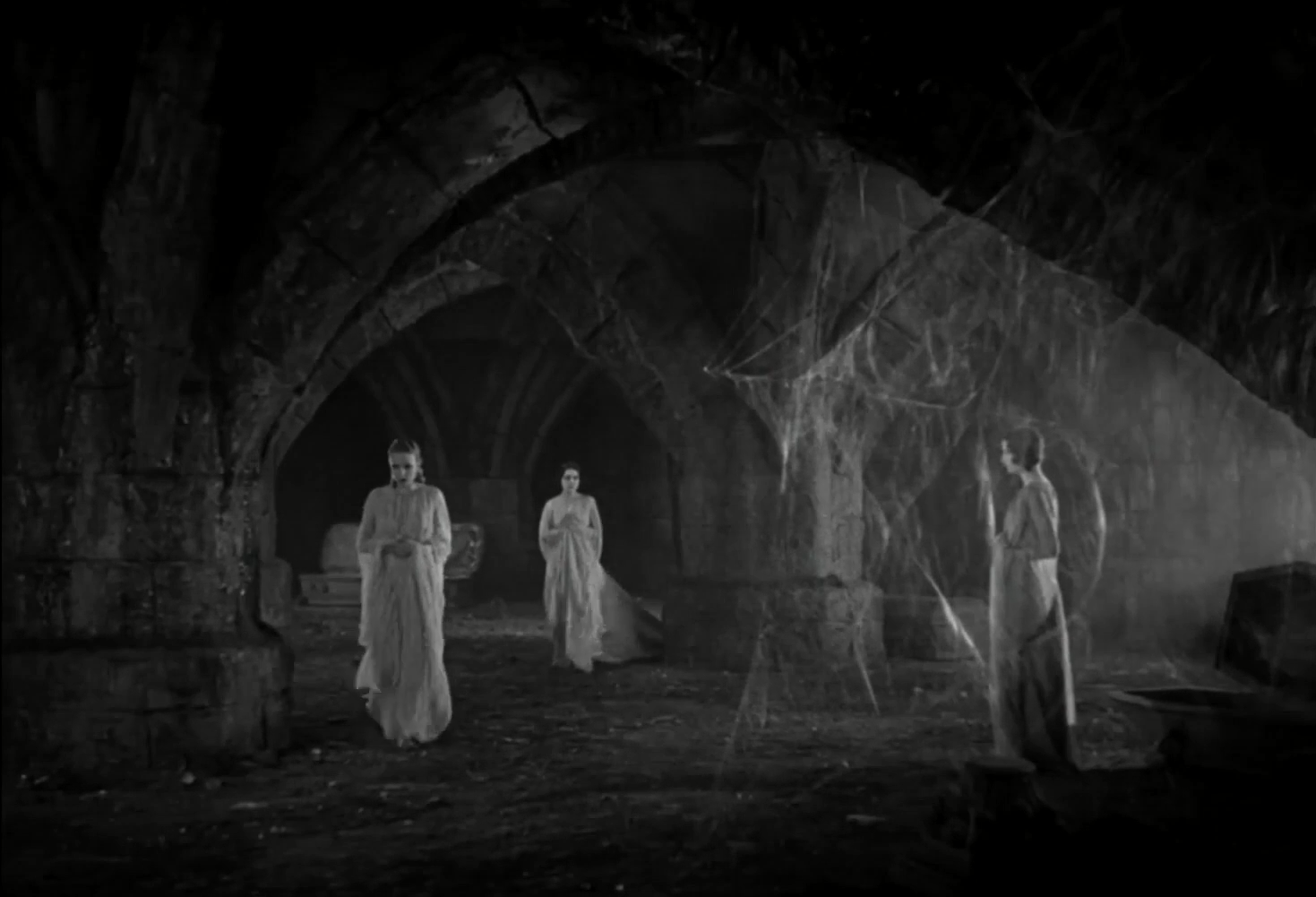
- Dorothy Tree, Geraldine Dvorak and Cornelia Thaw as Dracula’s brides in Dracula (1931).
- First appearance: Dracula
- Created by: Bram Stoker

In-universe information
- Nicknames: The Sisters; The Vixens; Weird Sisters; Dracula's Brides; The Brides
- Species: Undead human; Vampire
- Gender: Female
- Spouse: Possibly Count Dracula (unclear)
- Origin: Hungarian/Romanian
- Nationality: Austria-Hungary

The Brides of Dracula are fictional characters in Bram Stoker's 1897 novel Dracula. They are three seductive vampire "sisters" who reside with Count Dracula in his castle in Transylvania, where they entice men with their beauty and charm, and then proceed to feed upon them. Dracula provides them with victims to devour, mainly implied to be infants.

Like Dracula, they are the living dead, repulsed by sunlight, garlic and religious objects. In chapter three of the novel, two are described as having dark hair and red eyes, like Dracula, while the other as being fair, with blonde hair and blue eyes.

== Novel ==
Sometime near the beginning of the novel, after Jonathan Harker arrives in Dracula's castle, Dracula warns Harker that, if he leaves his room, to never sleep in any other room in the castle, but does not tell him why, clearly aware that the sisters will kill him.

Late one night, Jonathan explores the castle. He sits at a table writing in his journal and, as he begins to fall asleep, sees three women standing in the moonlight who cast no shadows. The women proceed to seduce him and, as one of them begins to kiss his neck, he feels her sharp teeth barely scrape against his flesh. Dracula then grabs her neck and hurls her away, chastising the brides for trying to feed on Harker when he was not done with him. He promises to give Harker to them after his business deal is concluded and gives them a "wiggling bag" (presumed by Harker to be a human child) to appease them. Harker soon fears for his life, at one point thinking he sees the brides dancing in the sky outside his bedroom, which strengthens his resolve to escape. Dracula makes good on his word and leaves Harker to the sisters when he heads for England. Though Harker manages to escape the castle alive shortly after, he is badly traumatized by the encounter and is diagnosed with brain fever. Though they lose their victim, the brides continue to haunt the castle and terrorize the nearby village.

The sisters are seen again near the end of the novel as the protagonists pursue Count Dracula to Transylvania. The sisters suddenly appear at a camp consisting of Abraham Van Helsing and Jonathan's wife Mina. Sensing that Mina is cursed with vampirism, they beckon her to join them, referring to her as their "sister" and promising not to harm her. However, Van Helsing had previously crushed a sacred wafer and scattered it in a circle around the campsite. Due to this protective barrier, both Mina and the sisters are unable to cross its border. Although the vampires keep away from the camp, they remain in the darkness until sunrise, upon which they flee back to the castle. At the coming of daylight, Van Helsing finds that their horses are dead, possibly having been drained of blood by the brides. After Van Helsing binds Mina in another ring of sacramental bread, he subsequently goes to Dracula's castle alone to destroy the vampires and sterilize Dracula's tomb, keeping him from ever being able to enter it again. After locating the vampires' graves, he finds them asleep 'open-eyed'. He attempts to kill the first but almost fails as he sees her beauty. Caught in an enchantment, he becomes entranced and lost in a state of uncertainty. Becoming overwhelmed with emotions, he feels compelled to protect her instead and even contemplates love for her. He suddenly hears a 'Soul Wail' from Mina which breaks the enchantment, allowing him to finish his work. First using a blacksmith hammer, he strikes a stake into her, then proceeds to operate on her, detaching the head from the body and filling the mouth with garlic. He repeats this process with the other two, taking him an entire day to complete. It is unknown whether or not Dracula feels any grief for their deaths.

== Characters ==
In the novel, the three vampire women are not individually named. Collectively, they are known as the "sisters", and are at one point described as the "weird sisters". Although the three vampire women in Dracula are generally referred to as the "Brides of Dracula" in popular culture and media, they are never referred to as such in the novel. Whether they are married to Dracula is not mentioned in the novel, nor are they described as having any other relation to him.

The origin and identity of the Sisters, as well as the true nature of their relationship with Count Dracula, is never revealed. One of the three may have been identified in the short story "Dracula's Guest", as the vampire named Countess Dolingen of Gratz. The protagonist of the story, who is never identified, but presumed to be Jonathan Harker, encounters her at her tomb in Munich. Just as she is about to bite him, a great wolf who is presumed to be Dracula intervenes and destroys her. The wolf keeps the protagonist warm from the cold and yelps for nearby soldiers to come to their location. In the novel, Harker writes about one of the female vampires in the moment he is with them, stating, "I seemed somehow to know her face and to know it in connection with some dreamy fear, but I could not recollect at the moment how or where."

The two dark-haired vampire women are described as facially resembling the Count, in that the three have aquiline noses. Literary scholar Jan B. Gordon suggests this that it may have been Stoker's intent that these two are Dracula's daughters, extending the sexuality metaphor of vampirism to incest. When the brides first discover Harker, the blonde vampire is encouraged to feed on him first, with one of the others stating, "Yours is the right to begin", signifying that she has some status over the others. This could imply that the blonde vampire is Dracula's wife or consort, and the mother of the two dark-haired women if they are indeed his daughters. When Van Helsing discovers the sisters' tombs, the blonde is far more opulent than the others', as if for a loved one or one of high status. Harker describes the women as "ladies by their dress and manner", indicating that the vampires are of high lineage, further suggesting the idea that they are Dracula's family. The blonde vampire is shown to act in a mildly rebellious manner toward Dracula when he scolds her for attempting to feed on Harker; Dracula's reaction upon discovering the sisters with Harker is both that of a jealous husband and an angry father. The vampire women claim that Dracula does not love them, nor has he ever loved them, but Dracula insists he does love them and shows he cares for them by providing them with victims to feed upon. However, it is not explained why he left them behind in Transylvania rather than taking them to London with him.

Even though it is never specified, it is possible that the term "sister" was not meant in the literal sense and is, instead, more comparable to the relationship of the women and not as they are to Dracula. They are also depicted in the novel calling Mina Harker their sister after she is forced to drink Dracula's blood, afflicting her with vampirism. Mina and her best friend (and Dracula's future victim) Lucy Westenra also call each other sisters in the novel despite not having any blood relation. The vampire women may be his wives throughout his lifetime, descendants of his whom he turned into vampires or simply nonspecific women he killed and turned into vampires to create more of his kind.

As vampires, the sisters are powerful in their own right; their beauty and seductive charm belie lethal, predatory interiors. Their beauty and flirtatious manner appear to be their greatest power when it comes to bewitching their victims into a trance-like state. Harker and Van Helsing are both attracted to and yet repulsed by them. They can seemingly appear out of nowhere and are inhumanly strong, as shown when they kill Van Helsing's horses. They also have the power of flight, as seen when they fly in the air with their dresses trailing behind them.

The vampires serve as foreshadowing for the threat of vampirism in the story which, as seen with Lucy, later on, includes Dracula's power of corruption over his victims once he has drained them of all their blood and transformed them into vampires.

== Screen adaptations ==
Commonly all three brides appear in film adaptations of the novel, though some film adaptations depict them as a blonde, a brunette, and a redhead. They are typically depicted as enchantingly beautiful young women, coquettish and seductive in manner, often appearing like succubi in the night, dressed in flowing silk nightgowns (despite the novel describing them as being dressed as noblewomen), and behaving in a wild and sexually aggressive manner.

- The three brides made silent appearances in the 1931 film Dracula and the Spanish language version of Drácula. (The latter film, shot simultaneously on the same sets at night with a separate cast and crew, depicts the brides as more obviously sexual than in the more chaste English-language version.) In the English-language film, they are played by Geraldine Dvorak, Cornelia Thaw, and Dorothy Tree. They are not seen after Dracula cast them aside and attacks Renfield. In the Spanish film, they themselves attack Renfield, but are not seen again after the fade out.
- In both Drakula İstanbul'da (1953) and Horror of Dracula (1958) only a single bride appears. In the latter film, the unnamed bride is played by Valerie Gaunt, who tricks and attacks Jonathan Harker and later is staked by him, growing old as she dies.
- The three brides make silent appearances in the 1968 television adaptation Dracula. Although they have no dialogue, the Brides are considerably feral in their behavior, snarling, screeching, and clawing at their victim, Jonathan Harker. They are also depicted as being somewhat disheveled instead of beautiful, with ragged clothing and filthy, matted hair. Notably, one of the brides is a black woman (played by Nina Baden-Semper) which appears to be unique amongst Dracula adaptations. The other two brides were portrayed by Margaret Nolan and Valerie Muller.
- The three brides appear and have lines in the 1970 film Count Dracula.
- The three brides appear and have lines in the Czechoslovak TV film Hrabě Drakula (1971). The brides in this version wear elaborate gowns befitting their status as noblewomen and have personal titles: Madame, Marquise, and Countess, respectively. They are portrayed by Olga Jirouskova, Marie Joanovicova, and Vera Kresadlova.
- The three brides are present but silent in the 1973 television adaptation Bram Stoker's Dracula (starring Jack Palance). They are played by Sarah Douglas, Virginia Wetherell, and Barbara Lindley. In this version, they succeed in feeding on and killing Jonathan Harker, and turn him into a vampire.
- All three appear and have lines in the 1977 BBC production entitled Count Dracula. They are played by Susie Hickford, Sue Vanner, and Belinda Meuldijk. One of the brides in this adaptation is a French woman.
- The 1973 television series Purple Playhouse adaptation of Dracula features only two brides rather than three. They first materialize in the library, and attempt to feed upon a sleeping Harker. Dracula prevents them from killing him and orders them to leave. They later appear to Harker shortly after Dracula has left for England, stating that now that Dracula has left them, they are "his brides", and proceed to feed upon him. They are not seen after this.
- In Francis Ford Coppola's 1992 film Bram Stoker's Dracula, the brides were played by Monica Bellucci, Michaela Bercu, and Florina Kendrick. Bellucci, Bercu, and Kendrick's dialogue was in Romanian, and Kendrick reportedly helped Bellucci speak her native tongue correctly. In this adaptation the vampire portrayed by Kendrick is clearly modelled on Medusa the Gorgon, and has living snakes coiled through her hair; another (played by Bellucci) appears to be based upon an Arabian princess due to her attire. The brunette vampire, portrayed by Kendrick, is the leader, rather than the blonde (portrayed by Bercu). All three brides have speaking lines – the one played by Bellucci is the bride who calls Jonathan into their chamber (in English), the bride played by Bercu is the one who tells Dracula he has never loved, and the bride played by Kendrick taunts Van Helsing.
- In the 1995 spoof Dracula: Dead and Loving It, only two brides appear. They are heavily sexualized; when they first arrive in Renfield’s room they attempt to seduce him. Dracula saves him from the brides and sends them away before convincing the simple-minded Renfield he had simply had a strange dream. The brides are neither named nor have any spoken dialogue in this film, and their fate at the end of the film is unknown.
- Three brides appear in the 2002 Italian TV mini-series Dracula (known as Dracula's Curse in foreign markets). As in the 1992 version, they speak in their native tongue and play up their supernatural nature by being able to fly and phase through objects.
- While the Brides usually remain nameless, they are named Verona, Aleera and Marishka in the 2004 film Van Helsing, respectively portrayed by Silvia Colloca, Elena Anaya, and Josie Maran. Verona is the oldest of the brides and seems to have chosen the other brides. Aleera, the second of the trio, is portrayed as the most vicious. Their roles are greatly expanded into secondary antagonists, motivated by a need to find a way for their offspring to live, as their vampire children are born dead. They are also given the ability to transform into harpy-like creatures and fly.
- At the beginning of the 2012 film Dracula 3D, Dracula attacks a young woman named Tania (portrayed by Miriam Giovanelli) after she secretly meets a lover, making her a vampire and his minion. He later passes her off as his niece to Harker, whom she tries to seduce. Tania is eventually dispatched by Van Helsing.
- In the 2020 Dracula TV series, Lujza Richter plays one of the vampire brides, named Elena. In this version Dracula keeps all his brides locked in boxes, conducting experiments on them and not permitting them to move freely around the castle. He also seems to refer to anyone that he turns into a full vampire as a "bride" (as he also uses the term to refer to Jonathan Harker, who is killed and turned into the undead in this version). As vampires in this series take on the characteristics of those they feed on, Elena is depicted as child-like due to mostly being fed babies.

== TV series ==
In 2015, NBC began to develop a TV series about the Brides of Dracula characters titled Brides, written by Roberto Aguirre-Sacasa and produced by Greg Berlanti and Sarah Schechter. The series was built on the premise "What if Van Helsing did NOT kill the three brides of Dracula? What if they survived for centuries and are now living in New York City?", with the series being described as a sexy reimagining of Dracula as a family drama with a trio of strong, diverse female leads, a show about empowered women and their attempts to maintain wealth, prestige, legacy, and their non-traditional family. In October 2019, the series was still being developed with the intention to sell it to a streaming service.

On January 8, 2020, it was announced that ABC handed out a pilot order to the series. Aguirre-Sacasa will pen the script and exec produce alongside Berlanti and Schechter. Maggie Kiley will direct the pilot. The Brides will be a co-production between ABC Studios and Warner Bros. Television. In March 2020, Deadline Hollywood reported the cast: Gina Torres as Cleo Phillips, the leader of this vampire trio and now a maven of New York City real estate; Katherine Reis as Lily Stevens, the youngest sister and now a striving singer; Chris Mason as Roland Grant, a stylish real estate mogul who arrives in town to challenge Cleo for professional supremacy and who has secret ties to Dracula; Sophia Tatum as Justine Strang, an aspiring model; Goran Višnjić as Dracula, the powerful, ageless, and iconic King of Night who “turned” each of his three brides and was left for dead at his destroyed castle in the Carpathian mountains; Erin Richards as Renée Pélagie, the sister who is now the head of a top modeling agency in New York City, known for her torrid affairs with her beautiful female models; and Charlie McElveen as Arthur Seward, an ambitious young news reporter working the graveyard shift at his paper covering news of the bizarre, and the love interest to Lily. On June 29, 2020, ABC decided to drop the series from the 2020–2021 lineup in the wake of the COVID-19 pandemic, but the series is being pitched to other networks.

== On stage ==
- They appear in Dracula, the Musical by Frank Wildhorn and have their own song "Forever Young".
- In the Czech musical Dracula, the brides are called "nymphs". They are the victims of Dracula, slightly resentful but still devoted to him. They are jealous and mischievous, and enjoy troubles and gossiping. They serve as a comical relief, but at the same time, they represent Dracula's dark, vampiric side.
- They also appear in the French Canadian musical Dracula – Entre l'amour et la mort.
- They appear in the Northern Ballet's Dracula by David Nixon and are portrayed by Rachael Gillespie, Minju Kang, and Sarah Chun in the 2019 production of the ballet, which was recorded and showed in UK cinemas on Halloween and then broadcast on BBC4 in 2020.

== Characters based on the original Brides ==
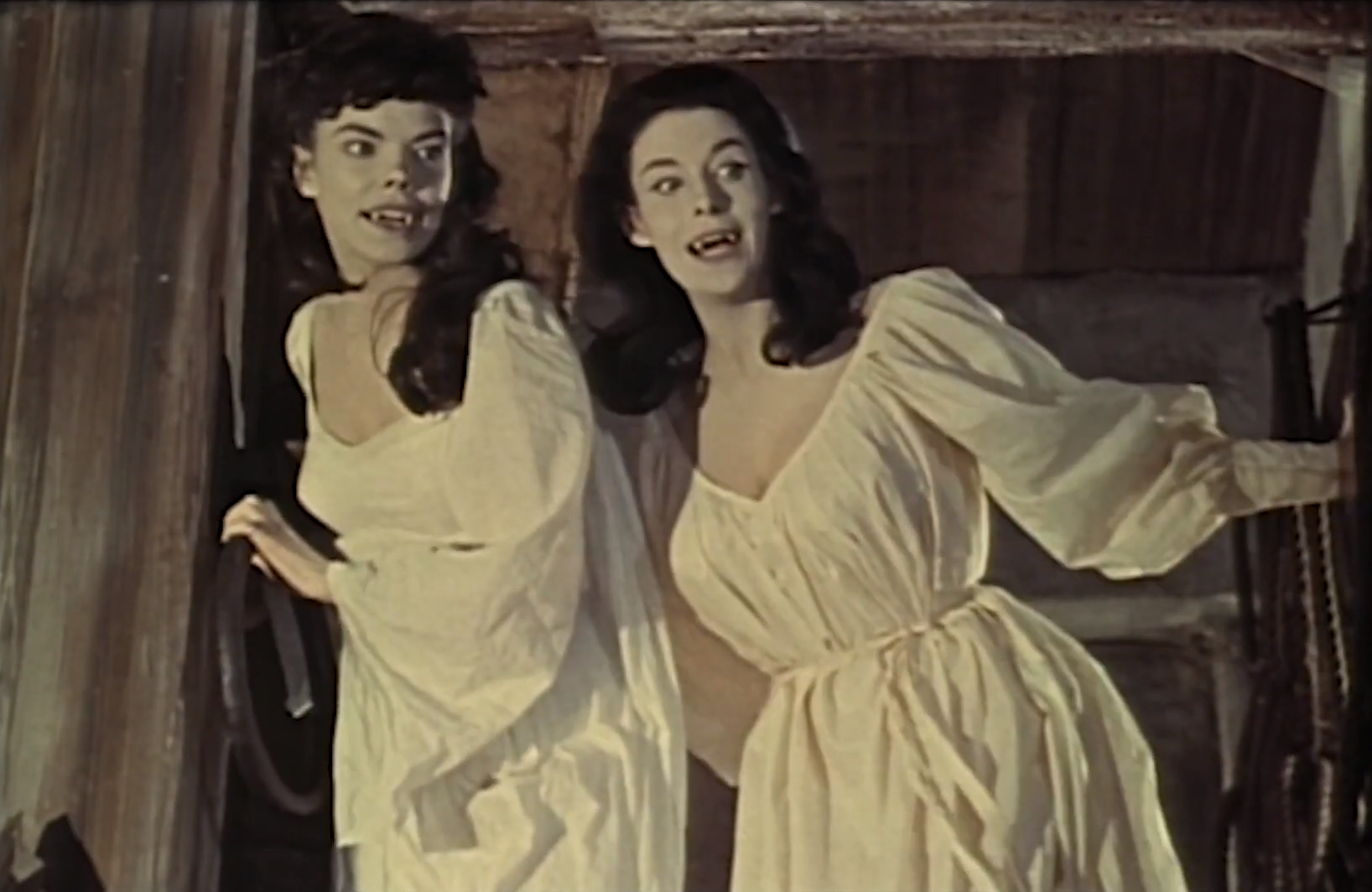
Andrée Melly and Marie Devereux in The Brides of Dracula

- In the 1943 film Son of Dracula, Dracula (using the alias Alucard) marries a woman named Kay Caldwell (Louise Allbritton) who willingly becomes a vampire because she wants to become immortal.
- In the 1960 Hammer film The Brides of Dracula, the Baron Meinster (David Peel) is a vampire who attacks an unnamed local village girl (played by Marie Devereux) and the heroine Marianne's friend Gina (Andrée Melly), turning them into vampires and his "brides". Although he actually proposes to Marianne (Yvonne Monlaur), his plan to turn her is thwarted by Professor Van Helsing (Peter Cushing), who kills the Baron while the two vampire brides seemingly escape. Despite the film's title, Dracula never appears in it.
- In Count Yorga, Vampire (1970), which is a modern-day re-telling of Dracula, Yorga likewise has his own set of Brides, first starting out with two: a red-haired Bride and a blonde (who is later revealed to be Donna's deceased mother), then later adding the protagonist's brunette friend, Erica to the ranks. The sequel, The Return of Count Yorga increases the number of Brides to a least a dozen, with the protagonist's sister, Ellen, and a friend, Mitzi, joining them.
- The Brides of Dracula concept was also present in the 1987 horror-comedy The Monster Squad, in which Dracula abducts three young women and turns them into his vampire brides.
- The Scooby-Doo franchise has adapted a bride of Dracula multiple times, in Who's Minding the Monster?, A Halloween Hassle at Dracula's Castle, and Scooby-Doo and the Reluctant Werewolf.
- In Dracula 2000, the brides are turned at different times throughout the movie. Jennifer Esposito, Jeri Ryan and Colleen Ann Fitzpatrick portray the brides, Solina, Valerie, and Lucy respectively.
- The brides also appear in the television series Buffy the Vampire Slayer in the season 5 premiere of "Buffy vs. Dracula" (2000). They are referred to as "The Three Sisters" and are credited as "Vampire Girls". They are portrayed by Marita Schaub, Lesli Jean Matta, and Jennifer Slimko. The novel Bloody Fool for Love names them Marita, Lesli and Jennifer after the actors who played them.
- In Hotel Transylvania (2012), Dracula's wife Martha (voiced by Jackie Sandler) is an homage to the Brides of Dracula.
- In the Dungeons & Dragons adventure module Curse of Strahd, three brides of Strahd (named Ludmilla Vilisevic, Anastrasya Karelova, and Volenta Popofsky) appear as enemies in the catacombs of Castle Ravenloft. Also in the catacombs are tomb markers mentioning a wife (Sasha Ivliskova) and a bride (Patrinna Velikovna), both of which can return as undead and attack the players. A male companion of Strahd named Escher appears in the adventure as well, possibly based on Harker.
- In Resident Evil: Village, Alcina Dimitrescu's three adopted daughters, Bela, Cassandra and Daniela, are a homage to the Brides.

== In literature ==
- In The Dracula Tape (1975) by Fred Saberhagen, the brides attempt to undermine Dracula. They are named Melisse, Wanda, and Anna.
- In the alternate history novel Anno Dracula (1992), Dracula becomes dominant in Britain and eventually weds Queen Victoria, becoming Prince consort and Lord Protector. Despite being married to Victoria he keeps his retinue of Brides. It is mentioned that one of the Brides is Barbara of Celje.
  In the first sequel, The Bloody Red Baron, the Brides of Dracula are mentioned as including Mata Hari, Lady Marikova (from the novel The House of Dracula by Ronald Chetwynd-Hayes), Lola-Lola (from the film The Blue Angel), Sadie Thompson, Lemora and Baron Meinster (from the film The Brides of Dracula).
  In the beginning of the second sequel, Dracula Cha Cha Cha, a list of Dracula's official Brides is given. They are: Elisabeta of Transylvania (from Bram Stoker's Dracula), 1448–1462; Ilona Szilagy (Vlad III's real-life second wife), 1466–1476; Marguerite Chopin of Courtempierre (from Vampyr), 1709–1711; Queen Victoria, 1886–1888; and Sari Gábor, 1948–1949. The plot surrounds Dracula's engagement to Princess Asa Vajda (from Black Sunday).
- The Chelsea Quinn Yarbro trilogy Sisters of the Night, with each book featuring the story of one of the Brides: The Angry Angel (1998) featuring Kelene, The Soul of an Angel (1999) featuring Fenice Zucchar and The Angel of Death (unpublished) featuring Zhameni.
- In The Diaries of the Family Dracul by Jeanne Kalogridis, the Brides are imagined as Zsuzsanna Tsepesh, a descendant of Vlad Dracul (believed in the novels to be his niece); Dunya, a Transylvanian servant of Vlad's mortal descendants, and Elisabeth Bathory, the notorious Hungarian noblewoman who murdered hundreds of her servants and bathed in their blood.
- In Fangland (2007), author John Marks re-imagines the Brides of Dracula as Greek brothers.
- In the Vampire Bride Dark Rebirth series by Rhiannon Frater, the original three Brides are named Cneajna, Elina and Ariana. The protagonist Glynis Wright becomes Dracula's fourth bride.
- In The Deathless Girls by Kiran Millwood Hargrave, the two dark-haired brides are sisters Kisaiya and Lillai. The blonde bride is an unnamed countess.
- In the Marvel Universe, the three Brides in the original novel are identified as Nikolett Bodo, Bettina Kaposvar and Emese Kisfaludi. They have been Brides since at least 1691 as revealed in the story Suffer Not a Witch in the Dracula Lives series. In the two-part story called The Pit of Death, set in 1809, the protagonist Lupescu is thrown into the titular pit while invading Dracula's castle. He is attacked by seven of Dracula's Brides, among them his blind wife, Velanna Lupescu. He manages to stake all seven and arranges their bodies into the shape of a cross so that Dracula would be unable to approach them to remove the stakes.
- A number of Brides are seen in the Marvel Comics series The Tomb of Dracula, ranging from victims long since turned from ancient times to recent ones of modern-day. In the story The Return to...Transylvania!, Dracula seeks out his Bride Marissa Constanda to turn him into a vampire, after he had previously become human. She refuses, telling Dracula that she now serves a new master. In the story Into the Tomb, Blade encountered two Brides named Beatrix Nanai and Catherine Kiskvnalas while looking for his mother Tara Cross, who had also been turned into a Bride. All three were killed by Blade.
- The Brides are seen in the DC Comics mini series, Victorian Undead II: Sherlock Holmes vs Dracula led by Lucy Westerna in trying to ambush the heroes when they come to investigate a possible hiding spot of Dracula's. Curiously despite the Brides being centuries older, Dracula gave Lucy command over them, likely because of her resistance to religious symbols due to being turned in a modern era.
- Dracula and his brides make a cameo appearance in the Tales of the Teenage Mutant Ninja Turtles story "Night of the Living Gingerbread".
- In the mini-series Grimm Fairy Tales present Helsing, three of the Brides track down the protagonist and try to kill her. She kills two of them before the third retreats. Near the end of the story, when the heroes track Dracula to his mansion during a party, we see he has amassed a large group of women as his Brides though orders them to let the protagonist pass so she may confront him. They show up briefly in the first issue of the sequel mini-series "Helsing vs Dracula".
- The Brides appear in Jonathan Green's ACE gamebook Dracula: Curse of the Vampire, here named Lilith, Lamia and Melusina. They are described as three seeresses who seek refuge with Dracula and are turned into his vampiric consorts. At one point, if the player takes the role of Jonathan Harker, he can see the Brides transform into monstrous forms: The eldest Bride into a living corpse, the other two into a snakewoman and a werebat, respectively.
