= Mina Harker =

Fictional character

- Dracula character
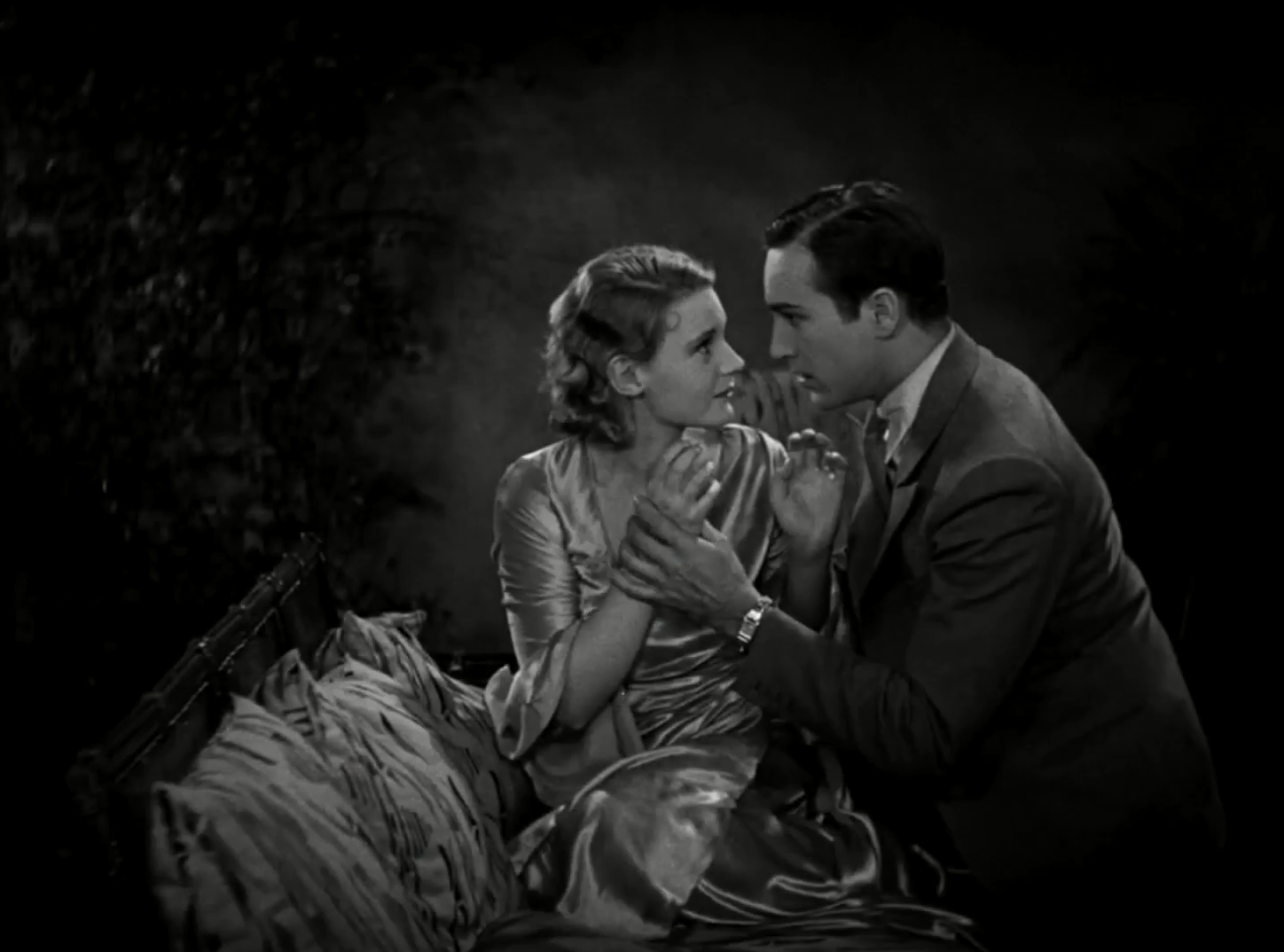
- Mina Harker as played by Helen Chandler with Jonathan Harker, played by David Manners, in Dracula (1931)
- Created by: Bram Stoker
- Portrayed by: See below

In-universe information
- Aliases: Miss Mina Murray; Madam Mina
- Species: Human
- Gender: Female
- Occupation: Schoolteacher
- Spouse: Jonathan Harker
- Children: Quincey Harker
- Nationality: British

Wilhelmina "Mina" Harker (née Murray) is a fictional character and the female protagonist in Bram Stoker's 1897 Gothic horror novel Dracula. In the original novel, Mina is a young schoolmistress who is bitten three times by Dracula, who also feeds her with his own blood, dooming her to become a vampire should she die. She remains telepathically connected with Dracula for the rest of the novel. Mina uses her inherent telepathic abilities to track Dracula's movements under the hypnotism of Abraham Van Helsing. Following Dracula's death, Mina is freed from the vampiric curse.

Throughout the years, the character has been portrayed in numerous media, from film to theater. In some adaptations, she is romantically paired with Count Dracula, either as his soulmate or as the reincarnation of his deceased wife. Other versions are believed to blend aspects of the character with historical accounts surrounding Vlad the Impaler’s unnamed first wife, who reportedly committed suicide in 1462 by throwing herself from the tower of Poenari Castle into the Argeș River to avoid capture by an encroaching army.

== Dracula ==
She begins the story as Miss Mina Murray, a young schoolmistress who is engaged to Jonathan Harker, and best friends with Lucy Westenra. She visits Lucy in Whitby on July 24 of that year, when schools would have closed for the summer. Unlike her best friend, Mina is an orphan who never knew her father or mother. Personality-wise, Mina is virtuous, intelligent and practical. She is praised as having a "man's brain" by her male counterparts, who are often surprised and impressed by her secretarial resourcefulness and insights, and becomes their moral mother figure who provides emotional support and religious ethical guidance.

After Mina's fiancé Jonathan escapes from Count Dracula's castle, she travels to Budapest and joins him there. Mina cares for him during his recovery from his traumatic encounter with the vampire and his brides, and the two return to England as husband and wife. Back home, they learn that Lucy has died from a mysterious illness stemming from severe blood loss as the result of repeated attacks by an unknown, blood-drinking animal. The animal, they learn, was none other than Dracula taking a different shape.

It is because of Mina that the party learn of the count's plans, as she is the one who collects all of the relevant information regarding the Count—including the various characters' journals, letters, and newspaper clippings—places it in chronological order, and types out multiple copies, giving them to each of the other protagonists. The result is the epistolary novel itself. Mina and Jonathan then join the coalition around Abraham Van Helsing, and turn their attention toward destroying the count. The party uses this information to discover clues about Dracula's plans and further investigate the locations of the various residences he purchases as a means to track him and destroy him. Each subsequent action the party takes is recorded by the various members and added to the collection of events surrounding Dracula.

After Dracula learns of this plot against him, he takes revenge by visiting - and biting - Mina at least three times. Dracula also feeds Mina his own blood, dooming her to become a vampire should she die. Afterwards, he kills Renfield and destroys all of the copies of their compiled records except for one, which Dr. Seward kept in a safe. The rest of the novel deals with the group's efforts to spare Mina a vampiric fate by tracking and attempting to kill Dracula. When Van Helsing attempts to bless her by placing a host against her forehead it burns her flesh, leaving a scar, thus proving that Dracula has made her unholy. Mina slowly succumbs to Dracula's influence, switching back and forth from a state of consciousness to one of semi-trance, during which she is telepathically connected with Dracula. Mina uses her inherent telepathic abilities to track Dracula's movements under the hypnotism of Van Helsing. Dracula later flees back to his castle in Transylvania, followed by the entire group who split up. As Van Helsing takes Mina with him on his journey to Dracula's castle to slay the Brides of Dracula, the rest of the party attempt to locate and raid the ship Dracula is using. As time passes, Van Helsing's ability to hypnotize Mina diminishes significantly. Her appearance and manner become more vampire-like, to the point where she loses her appetite as well as her ability to stay awake during the day.

While Mina and Van Helsing are at camp, Van Helsing crumbles a sacred wafer in a circle around Mina as she sleeps during the daytime. Upon waking, she is unable to cross the circle at all. Van Helsing reasons that if Mina is unable to exit the circle, vampires would be unable to enter as well. This is confirmed when, later in the night, the brides come to the camp, but are unable to cross the ring around Mina and Van Helsing. The brides beckon her to join them but fail to do so. Van Helsing is relieved when he notices how Mina looks at them with fear and disgust, and he realizes she isn't like them yet. The brides fly back to Dracula's castle before sunrise, where they meet their demise at Van Helsing's hands. Curiously, when Van Helsing is about to stake the first bride, he is stopped by her beauty and hesitates, but is then snapped out of it by a "soul wail" from Mina; Van Helsing is unsure if he imagined it or she used some of her newfound power to help him. When the party kills Dracula just before sunset, Dracula's vampiric spell is lifted and Mina is freed from the curse.

The book closes with a note written seven years later, about Mina's and Jonathan's married life, and the birth of their first-born son. They name their son Quincey in remembrance of their friend, Quincey Morris, who was killed by Dracula's Roma minions during the final confrontation. The birth of Jonathan and Mina's son signifies hope and renewal of life as the close of the novel ushers in the 20th century.

== In other books ==
=== Novels and Comics ===
- Mina is one of the main characters in 1975 novel The Dracula Tape by Fred Saberhagen, which is a retelling of Bram Stoker's Dracula from Dracula's point of view, and is also a recurring character within the ten-part book series which this is the first book of.
- In Anno Dracula, a 1992 novel by Kim Newman, the first in the Anno Dracula series, Mina Harker became a vampire and Dracula's bride. The novel tells an alternate history in which Dracula marries Queen Victoria and rules England as her consort, and vampirism is widespread.
- Mina is the central character in the 1994 book Mina ... The Dracula Story Continues, and the 2000 sequel Blood to Blood: The Dracula Story Continues, by Marie Kiraly.
- The Letters of Mina Harker is a 1998 novel by Dodie Bellamy, in which the author identifies with the character of Mina, and mixes fiction with autobiography, fictionalizing Mina as a woman living in 1980s San Francisco.
- Mina Murray (returning to her maiden name after having divorced her husband) is one of the lead characters of Alan Moore and Kevin O'Neill's comic book series The League of Extraordinary Gentlemen (1999-2019). She is a bisexual suffragist and leader of the titular team, and is involved in a romantic relationship with Allan Quatermain. She and Allan are the only remaining members of the initial League after a Martian invasion. She subsequently becomes immortal, remaining young even in the year 2009. She is in a polyamorous relationship with the gender-changing omnisexual Orlando. It is implied that she still feels trauma over her encounter with Dracula and has disfiguring scars on her neck, which she covers with a red scarf.
- In Dracula the Un-dead, (2009) co-written by Dacre Stoker, a great-nephew of the original author, Mina's son, Quincey, is claimed to be a product of rape and Dracula's biologically human son, conceived at some point when Dracula was attacking Mina.
- In From the Pages of Bram Stoker's Dracula: Harker (2009), written by Tony Lee and endorsed by Dacre Stoker and Ian Holt, Mina becomes bound to Dracula's spirit as his remaining allies attempt to use her unborn child as his new body.
- Mina Murray appears in the novel European Travel for the Monstrous Gentlewoman (2018)(the second novel in The Extraordinary Adventures of the Athena Club series) by Theodora Goss. In the novel she is former governess of Mary Jekyll, daughter of the infamous Dr. Jekyll. Mary receives a letter from Mina, asking for her help, and sets on a mission to help Mina, discovering later that Mina Murray isn't all that she seems.
- In "Lucy Undying" (2024) by Kiersten White, Mina Murray is Lucy's former governess, and Lucy is infatuated with Mina. It's revealed later that Mina is manipulative antagonist, who orchestrates inheritance scheme and uses others around her for her again.

=== Japanese media ===
In the light novels (also later adapted into two anime films and a manga series) Vampire Hunter D, the ancient vampire Count Magnus Lee refers to a "Mina the Fair" who was pursued by the "Sacred Ancestor" (revealed in the English dub of the first film to be "our sire Count Dracula"). It is implied that she may be the mother of D (the son of the Sacred Ancestor).

In the 1997 manga series Hellsing, a character referred to only as "The Shi" is eventually revealed to be Mina Harker. While Dracula (later Alucard) was defeated, the curse still remained active deep within her body, as Dracula did not truly die. Some time prior to or during World War II, Mina's remains are stolen by Millennium, using the vampiric essence within her bones as the basis of their artificial vampire project. Her corpse remained in their possession until the year 2000, likely being incinerated in the final volume during the destruction of Millenniums flagship. Mina is also seen in a flashback of Alucard's defeat as Dracula, with Arthur Holmwood embracing her as Dracula lay dying.

In the 2005 manga series Dance in the Vampire Bund, the central female vampire protagonist is named "Mina Țepeș", a reference to Vlad Țepeș, one of the inspirations for Dracula.

== Portrayals ==
Over the years, Mina has been portrayed in numerous adaptations across film, television, animation, and stage, and several other characters have also been inspired by or based on Mina.

=== Films ===
- In F. W. Murnau's Nosferatu (1922), the character is renamed Ellen, due to the copyright issues surrounding this film, and is portrayed by Greta Schröder. In a significant deviation from the original novel, she sacrifices herself to Count Orlok (the film's version of Dracula) so he will be destroyed by the rising sun.
- Helen Chandler played her in Universal Pictures' Dracula (1931), directed by Tod Browning and starring Bela Lugosi as the Count. In this adaptation, Mina was Dr. John Seward's daughter and so it is implied that her name was Mina Seward.
- Lupita Tovar played Eva (the film's version of Mina) in Drácula (Spanish version, 1931).
- In the 1953 Turkish film Drakula İstanbul'da (Dracula in Istanbul) Güzin (the film's version of Mina) is played by Annie Ball. The events of the novel are updated to 1950s and Dracula here moves to Turkey from his castle in Transylvania. Güzin is a cabaret dancer. At one point Dracula places Güzin under his hypnotic control and has her dance for him on the stage (to the accompaniment of a supernaturally played piano) as he sits alone in the audience. As she finishes this command performance, Dracula applauds, and then tells her "Tonight you danced better than any other night. I won't harm you. You are a beautiful being. I will drink you bit by bit".
- In Hammer Horror's Dracula (1958), Mina was portrayed by Melissa Stribling and was married to Arthur Holmwood instead of Jonathan Harker.
- In a 1970 Spanish-Italian-German horror film Count Dracula, Mina was portrayed by Maria Rohm and Christopher Lee played the title role, though it was not a Hammer production like his other Dracula films. This adaptation tried to stay faithful to the novel.
- In the 1978 adult horror film Dracula Sucks, Mina is portrayed by Annette Haven and it is implied that she becomes a vampire by the end of the movie.
- In the 1979 romantic horror comedy Love at First Bite Dracula moves to New York in 1970s and pursues there fashion model Cindy Sondheim (played by Susan Saint James), whom Dracula recognizes as a reincarnation of his true love; Mina is mentioned as a previous reincarnation. Cindy does retain some of the memories from her past life.
- In the 1979 film Nosferatu the Vampyre, a remake of the 1922 Nosferatu, the names of female characters were swapped. What was Lucy's character in the novel is now named Mina (played by Martje Grohmann), here she is the first one to be killed by Dracula, and what was Mina's character in the novel is now named Lucy (played by Isabelle Adjani) – who here is wife of Jonathan Harker – and Dracula's primary victim.
- Mina was played by Jan Francis in the 1979 film Dracula directed by John Badham, in which she is Van Helsing's daughter. This adaptation also switches Mina's role and makes Lucy (played by Kate Nelligan) – who here is the daughter of Dr. Seward – Jonathan Harker's fiancée and Dracula's primary victim.
- Mina was portrayed by Winona Ryder in Bram Stoker's Dracula, the 1992 Francis Ford Coppola film adaptation of the novel, in which she is believed to be the reincarnation of Dracula's centuries-dead wife, Elisabeta.
- In Mel Brooks' parody Dracula: Dead and Loving It (1995), Mina is portrayed by Amy Yasbeck. Here she is Dr. John Seward's daughter.
- In the 2003 film The League of Extraordinary Gentlemen, Mina Harker was portrayed by Peta Wilson. In a deviation from the comic the film was based on, the film has Mina remain a partially-turned vampire (a Dhampir) after Dracula's death, and she keeps the surname Harker, having outlived her husband Jonathan rather than divorced him. Unlike the comic, there is no relationship between her and Allan Quatermain, but she attracts some interest from both Doctor Henry Jekyll and Special Agent Tom Sawyer, and a past relationship with Dorian Gray is hinted at before he is revealed to be a double agent working for their enemy.
- In 2012 vampire horror film Dracula 3D by Dario Argento Mina Harker was portrayed by Marta Gastini. In this version she comes to Dracula's castle in search of her husband Jonathan Harker and turns out to look exactly like Dracula's wife, Dolingen de Gratz, who died some centuries ago.
- In the 2012 vampire horror film Dracula Reborn, which takes place in 21st century California, Lina Harker (Mina in this version) was portrayed by Victoria Summer. In this version Lina becomes a vampire by the end of the film, kills her husband Jonathan and becomes the Master Vampire, taking over Dracula's home and position after his demise.
- In 2013, Monal Gajjar portrayed Meena (Mina in this version) in the Indian Malayalam-language horror film Dracula 2012. In this film Dracula moves from Romania to India in 2010s.
- A woman named Mina appears at the end of Dracula Untold (2014), portrayed by Sarah Gadon. Following the film's climax, the movie (which mostly takes place in the 15th century) flashes forward to the present day, when a woman named Mina, who strongly resembles Dracula's long-dead wife Mirena, is approached by Dracula himself. After Dracula compliments Mina and recites Mirena's favourite piece of poetry, which turns out to be Mina's favourite poem as well, the movie ends with the two departing together.
- In 2021 film Bram Stoker's Van Helsing, Mina Harker (portrayed by Helen Crevel) briefly appears at the end of the film in order to give information to Professor Van Helsing.
- Mina is portrayed by India Lillie Davies in Dracula: The Original Living Vampire (2022) by The Asylum. Here, she is a real estate agent instead of Jonathan Harker, helping Dracula move into his new home. She is now in a same-sex relationship with detective Amelia Van Helsing. She is believed to be the reincarnation of Dracula's long lost bride who died on the day they were meant to be wed.
- In the 2024 film Nosferatu, a remake of the 1922 Nosferatu, the character is again renamed to Ellen Hutter and is portrayed by Lily-Rose Depp. Unlike in Murnau's film, Ellen is a haunted young woman who has previously established connection to Count Orlok (the film's version of Dracula), when she accidentally made a psychic pact with him and became his astral lover when she was younger. That created an obsession that resulted in Orlok coming to Germany and unleashing horrors and plague on the town. Professor Von Franz (the film's version of Van Helsing) does all the research instead of her, finds a way to kill Orlok, and talks Ellen into sacrificing herself to him in order to stop the plague.
- Jocelin Donahue in Abraham's Boys (2025) An American horror film based on the short story of the same name by Joe Hill. Taking place nearly 2 decades after the events of the novel, Mina married the much-older Dr. Abraham Van Helsing after the death of her first husband. The pair have two teen sons, Max and Rudy, and moved to California to escape the influence of vampires. Mina is a physically delicate and mentally muddled woman who appears to dislike her strict husband, whom she feels obligated to feel "grateful" towards for holding off the vampiric influence which formerly controlled her. She comes to question whether he hadn't trapped her himself with years of manipulation using medicine, influence, and hypnotism instead of truly "saved" her from a vampire.
- In the French film Dracula (2025), Mina is portrayed by Zoë Bleu Sidel. In this version she lives in Belle Epoque Paris in 1889 and is a reincarnation of Dracula's wife Elisabeta, who was accidentally killed by Dracula in fifteenth century.

=== Television ===
- In 1968 British TV film Dracula Mina Harker was played by Suzanne Neve. It's implied that she becomes a vampire by the end of the film.
- In 1971 Czechoslovak TV film Hrabě Drakula Mina Harker was played by Klára Jerneková. It was a fairly faithful adaptation of the novel. It was the first screen adaptation to show Mina drinking Dracula's blood from the cut on his chest.
- In the 1973 television film Bram Stoker's Dracula Mina is portrayed by Penelope Horner.
- Blair Brown portrayed Mina Harker in the Dracula (Purple Playhouse).
- The BBC produced a version entitled Count Dracula in 1977. Mina was played by Judi Bowker. The film was fairly faithful to Stoker's original novel, except that it portrayed Mina and Lucy as sisters.
- The mini-series Dracula's ring (1978) is an updated variation set in Malta and Denmark, with Mina Harker renamed Mina Mortensen and played by Danish actress Brita Fogsgaard.
- In the 2002 Italian two-part English-language TV miniseries Dracula, Mina is portrayed by Stefania Rocca. This adaptation updates the events of the novel to the 21st century and takes place entirely in Budapest. Mina is the one who kills Dracula in the end.
- In 2005, Sreeja Chandran portrayed the character in the Indian Malayalam-language television series Dracula, which aired on Asianet.
- In 2006 a British television film entitled Dracula aired, with Stephanie Leonidas in the role of Mina Murray. She is depicted as a Roman Catholic. The film makes some changes to the original novel; Jonathan Harker dies and by the end of the film, Mina and Dr. John Seward have become a couple.
- In 2008, Beenu Baradwaj essayed her role in the Indian Telugu-language television series Dracula, which aired on Gemini TV.
- Zoe Tapper portrayed Mina Harker in Demons (2009) as a half-vampire whose full powers come out when she ingests some of Dracula's blood, which still flows in her veins. Her 'default' state leaves her blind, with psychic abilities that she can use to sense the nature of the demons the main characters are presently facing.
- Jessica De Gouw portrayed Mina Murray in the TV series Dracula (2013). In this role, she is a medical student who is engaged to Jonathan Harker and is the reincarnation of Dracula's long-dead wife, Ilona.
- Olivia Llewellyn portrays Mina Murray in the TV series, Penny Dreadful (2014–2016). In this continuity she is the daughter of Sir Malcolm Murray (Timothy Dalton) and best friend of Vanessa Ives. She is transformed into a vampire by Dracula, and her father shoots her to save Vanessa Ives.
- Morfydd Clark portrays Mina Murray in the miniseries Dracula (2020). In this continuity she is engaged to Jonathan Harker and visits him in the convent in Hungary after his escape from Dracula's castle. The convent is infiltrated by Dracula, who kills everybody and then wears Harker's skin to get to the last survivors, Sister Agatha Van Helsing and Mina. Agatha surrenders her life in exchange for Mina's, who was let go by Dracula. Later, Mina creates a foundation in Jonathan's name.
- A procedural in a contemporary New York City with Dr. Abraham Van Helsing, who uses his uniquely inquisitive mind working alongside his ex, relentless FBI special agent Mina Harker, to solve New York City’s most harrowing cases is in the development at CBS and Lionsgate Television.

=== Animation ===
- A character based on Mina appears in an American animated television series called Mina and the Count about a seven-year-old girl named Mina Harper (voiced by Ashley Johnson, and later, Tara Strong) and her encounters with Vlad the Count, a 700-year-old vampire (voiced by Mark Hamill).
- In a 2000 anime film Vampire Hunter D: Bloodlust the protagonist Vampire Hunter D sees a vision of his human mother in a room filled with blood, in which she apologizes to D for birthing him as a dhampir, and states that she couldn't help it as she was a human in love with D's vampire father. D, realizing that it's a vision conjured by his enemy Carmilla, strikes this vision of his mother down with his sword. In Vampire Hunter D's lore his mother is implied to be Mina, while his father is mentioned to be Dracula.

=== Characters based on Mina ===
- The film Count Yorga, Vampire (1970), which is a modern retelling of Dracula, has a character similar to Mina named Donna (played by Donna Anders) being the main target of the titular vampire. It is the death of her mother, whom Yorga was dating, that starts the plot. She is later hypnotized and lured to his manor where she finds that her mother has become a vampire. Unlike Mina, Yorga succeeds in turning her into a vampire and Donna proceeds to attack her boyfriend after Yorga is killed at the end of the film.
- A navigator Mina Murray played by Alexandra Kamp appears in Dracula 3000 (2004), the futuristic story about Dracula set in outer space in the 30th century. This Mina is not intended to be the same person as the character in the novel.
- An elderly Mina Harker is played by Elisabeth Counsell in The Invitation (2022). However this version of Mina is just random villager who is in league with the titular vampire of the movie

=== On stage ===
- Mina was played by Edith Craig (daughter of actress Ellen Terry) in the first stage adaptation of the novel, called Dracula, or The Un-Dead, that was written and directed by Bram Stoker himself, and performed once only at the Lyceum Theatre in London for the sole purpose of securing a stage copyright on the material in England. It took place on May 18, 1897.
- Mina was played by Dora Mary Patrick and Dorothy Vernon in Hamilton Deane's 1924 play in Derby and London, England. In this version the events of the novel were updated to 1920s, happen entirely in England and were turned into drawing-room mystery drama. In 1927 the play was brought to Broadway by producer Horace Liveright, who hired John L. Balderston to revise the play for American audiences. As a result of Balderston's revision, the names of female characters were swapped, and what was Stoker's Mina character became now Lucy Seward, daughter of Dr.Seward. She was played on Broadway by Dorothy Peterson. Ann Sachs played the role of Lucy Seward in the revival of the play in 1977. Lauren Thompson replaced Sachs in the role some time later before the play closed in 1980. It was the first adaptation of the novel, where Dracula showed some romantic feelings for her, including kissing her on the lips and saying to the men in the play that she would become his consort.
- Mina was played by Victoria Kingsley in 1927 play by Charles Morrell. The play was commissioned by Florence Stoker, who wanted a new stage play that she could completely own, as she was dissatisfied with royalties from Deane's play. The play had large sections of verbatim dialogue from the novel and a number of Shakespearean references. It also included the scene, where Mina drank blood from Dracula's chest (which was absent from Deane's play), with Dracula saying to her "Come, drink of my blood, that you may become even as I". The play premiered in Royal Court Theatre in Warrington, England and run for a few weeks.
- Mina was played by Cecilia Milone in 1991 original Argentinian production of Dracula el musical. The musical is the most popular musical in Argentina and had several revivals.
- Mina was played by Melissa Errico in 2004 Broadway production of Dracula, the Musical by Frank Wildhorn.
- Mina was played by Andrée Watters in 2006 French Canadian musical Dracula – Entre l'amour et la mort.
- Mina was played by Nathalie Fauquette in 2011 French musical Dracula, l'amour plus fort que la mort. The part was entirely dancing one.
- Mina was portrayed by Abigail Prudames in 2019 Northern Ballet's production of Dracula by David Nixon. The production was recorded and showed in UK cinemas on Halloween and then broadcast on BBC4 in 2020.
- Mina was portrayed by Yuka Ebihara in 2022 Polish National Ballet's production of Dracula by Krzysztof Pastor.The production was recorded and uploaded on Youtube in 2025.
- Mina was played by Danielle Jam in 2023 National Theatre of Scotland's production of Dracula: Mina's Reckoning where she played the protagonist in a feminist retelling of Dracula. The production was all-female and non-binary, was recorded and will be on the NTS Education Portal.

=== Video games ===
The 2003 video game Castlevania: Aria of Sorrow features Mina Hakuba, a childhood friend and love interest of protagonist Soma Cruz, who is later revealed to be the reincarnation of Dracula. Mina's given name and family name bear a clear resemblance to Mina Harker's name, and the relationship she shares with Soma parallels that of Dracula and Harker. Mina also appears in Castlevania: Dawn of Sorrow, but cannot be interacted with, only appearing in the intro and ending, though a doppelganger of Mina is killed by the main antagonist midway into the game in order to try and force Soma into becoming the new dark lord of the castle.

A Vampire by the name of Mina Ha was introduced to the Hero Shooter Deadlock in 2025, although her backstory and character differ from the original, the name remains as an homage to Bram Stokers original.

=== Miscellaneous ===
- In the radio drama Dracula by The Mercury Theatre on the Air, which was broadcast in 1938, Mina was played by Agnes Moorehead. In the drama, Dracula refers to her as "my bride" and "my love" at one point. Mina is the one who stakes him in the end. Dracula was played by Orson Welles.
- In the web series Carmilla (2014-2016), Laura Hollis, who is subject of affection from vampire Carmilla, says, "What would Mina Harker do? Get bitten. Mina Harker would totally try and act all alluring to the bloodsucking fiend and totally get bitten. Let's not do that.”
- Magic: The Gathering's 2021 set Crimson Vow released a set of alternate cards based on characters and locations from Dracula. Included among them was a version of the card Thalia, Guardian of Thraben bearing the name and likeness of Mina Harker.
