= Lucy Westenra =

Fictional character

- Dracula character
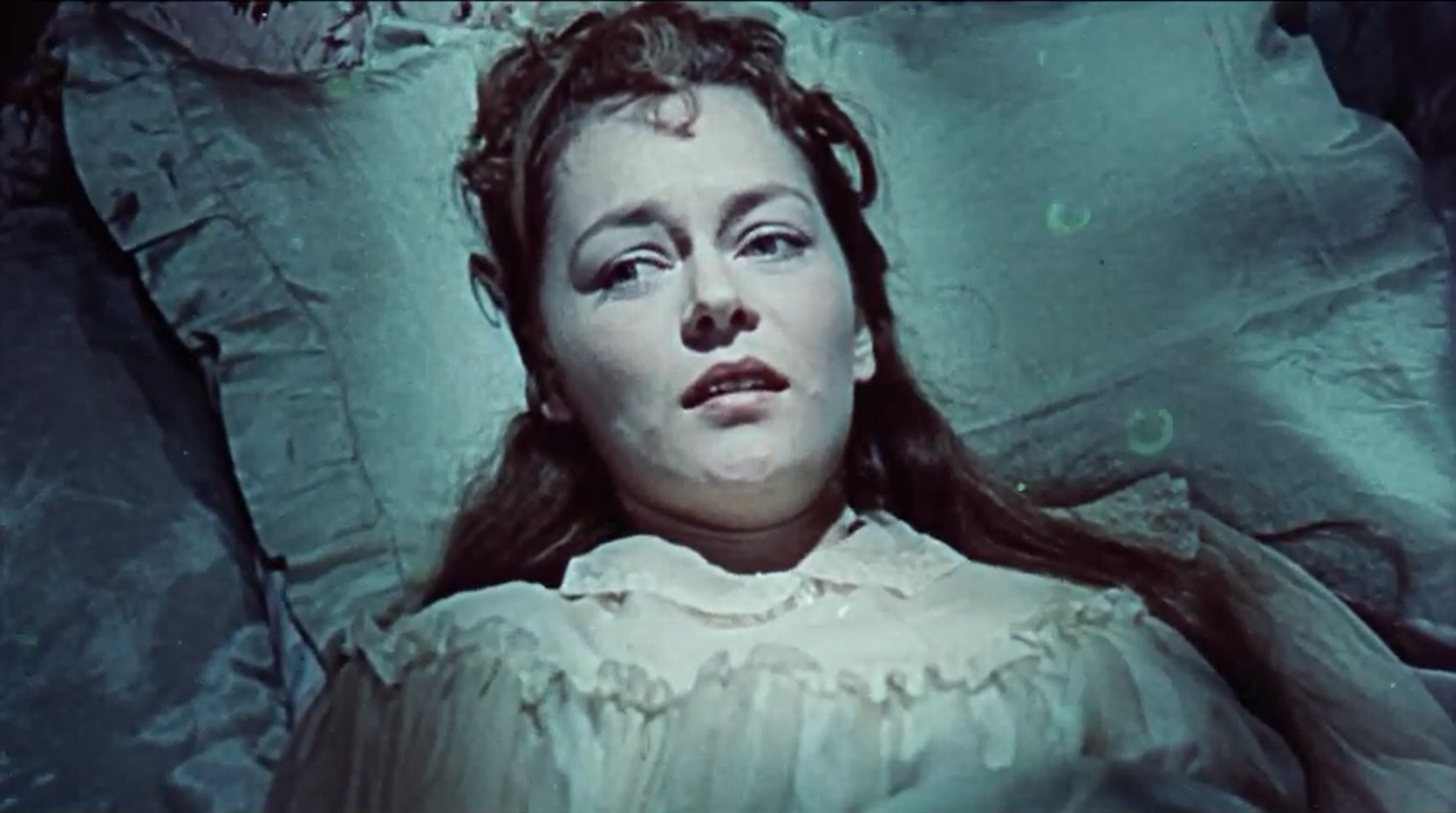
- Carol Marsh as Lucy in the 1958 film
- Created by: Bram Stoker

In-universe information
- Species: Human; Vampire
- Gender: Female
- Occupation: Socialite
- Family: Mrs. Westenra (mother)
- Significant other: Arthur Holmwood
- Nationality: British

Lucy Westenra is a fictional character in the 1897 novel Dracula by Bram Stoker. She is the 19-year-old daughter of a wealthy family and is Mina Murray's best friend. Early in the story, Arthur Holmwood, John Seward, and Quincey Morris, propose to Lucy on the same day. Despite deep affection for them all, she turns down the latter two and accepts the proposal of her true love, Arthur. Before Lucy can marry, Count Dracula attacks her while she is sleepwalking outside. Her health declines, and Seward enlists the help of his friend and mentor Abraham Van Helsing. Their efforts to cure her fail, and Lucy dies. She returns after her death as a vampire and attacks children, who dub her the "Bloofer Lady". The suitors and Van Helsing eventually corner her into her crypt and destroy her, putting her soul to rest.

Lucy has appeared in most adaptations of Stoker's novel, although they change many aspects of her character. For example, the 1927 stage play swaps her and Mina's names.

== Character history ==
A 19-year-old Lucy Westenra writes to her friend Mina that she would like to marry all of three of her suitors, so none of them will feel sad. They propose to her on the same day, Arthur Holmwood, the wealthy heir of Lord Godalming; Quincey Morris, a Texan adventurer; and Dr John Seward, a psychiatrist—and she chooses Holmwood. Lucy falls ill, and much to the men's dismay no explanation can be found. Seward summons Dr Abraham Van Helsing from the Netherlands, who deduces that a vampire has been feeding on her. Van Helsing attempts to thwart Dracula by securing the house with garlic blossoms but is unsuccessful when Lucy's mother, whom everyone else has kept ignorant to avoid worrying her, removes it. Their secrecy is in vain for she dies of fright when a large wolf (implied to be controlled by Dracula or the vampire himself in a different shape) attacks her and Lucy while Van Helsing and Seward are absent. Lucy herself is close to death when Van Helsing and Seward visit her with Arthur and Quincy the next morning. However, under the vampire's influence, she becomes even more prone to sleepwalking and is drawn outside, where the Count fatally drains her of blood. In her final moments, her vampiric side emerges and tries to bite Arthur, but Lucy regains her human senses and before dying asks Van Helsing to "guard [Holmwood], and give me peace".

A week after her burial, Lucy rises from the grave as a vampire and attacks children. Van Helsing makes some inferences by the telltale bite marks on their necks, the timing of her death and the start of the attacks. While visiting her tomb after dark, the men encounter her undead corpse feeding on a child. Far from the pure, kind-hearted young woman she was in life, she appears as a predatory temptress. Seward notes this corruption: "Lucy Westenra, but yet how changed. The sweetness was turned to adamantine, heartless cruelty, and the purity to voluptuous wantonness".

Van Helsing repels her attempts to seduce her former fiancé with a crucifix. Her vampire form flees into her tomb as the sun rises. Van Helsing and her suitors open her coffin and drive a wooden stake through her heart, destroying the vampire form and allowing Lucy to rest in peace. To ensure that Dracula will not reclaim her, they fill her mouth with garlic before decapitating her and soldering the lid to her coffin. Lucy's death motivates her suitors and Mina to join forces with Van Helsing and Jonathan Harker in hunting and destroying Dracula.

== Historical background ==
According to Sally Ledger, Lucy "is at first sight an archetype of Victorian femininity" but later shares characteristics with the then-feminist ideal of the New Woman.

Leslie Ann Minot pointed out, in a 2017 essay on Lucy Westenra and other 19th century female characters, that if Dracula is an overt portrayal of a sexualized monster then her attacks on children would then equate to "the sweet Lucy sexually molesting toddlers"; Minot sees this as one reason why the character has received less attention than others. She historicizes the character (and the novel) by placing it against a backdrop of a number of well-publicized cases of molestation and abuse of children by mother figures, particularly in the context of baby farming, citing the case of Margaret Waters. Victorian society had begun to take an interest in the welfare of children, resulting in the Factory and Workshop Act 1891 (54 & 55 Vict. c. 75) and the foundation of the SPCC, which would become the National Society for the Prevention of Cruelty to Children.

Stoker was well aware of these developments and was close friends with W. T. Stead, the newspaper editor who supported the SPCC, published lurid accounts of child abuse and was himself jailed for the abduction of a 13-year old girl, which he organized as a demonstration. Stoker used newspaper clippings in the novel that are pastiches of the sensationalist writings of Stead and others about child prostitution, in particular Stead's "The Maiden Tribute of Modern Babylon", and he describes the lower-class victims in much the same way. Their childish talk leads to "bloofer lady" as a child's way of saying "beautiful lady". This "bloofer lady" talks to children and lures them with the promise of riches and games, and after returning, bearing bite marks, they become emaciated and weak and wish to return to the "bloofer lady". All this is described in language similar to that of newspaper reports on procuresses seducing children into prostitution. Minot also called Lucy "a demonic mother-parody, taking nourishment from children instead of giving it".

Her surname is derived from the Westenra family of Ireland, descended from Dutch Protestant settlers of the Van Wassenaer family; Derrick Westenra, 5th Baron Rossmore was a notable figure at the time Dracula was written.

== Appearances ==
=== On screen ===
Year	Title	Actress	Notes
1922	Nosferatu	Ruth Landshoff	Ruth (a character similar to Lucy) is the sister of shipbuilder Harding, in the 1922 German silent film
1931	Dracula	Frances Dade	Although the film is based on the stage adaptation, which switched Mina and Lucy's names, Universal's film retains the naming of Stoker's novel. However, Lucy's last name has been changed to Weston.
1931	Dracula	Carmen Guerrero	In the Spanish-language version by Universal of the same year, Carmen Guerrero portrays Lucia Weston.
1953	Drakula İstanbul'da	Ayfer Feray	In this Turkish adaptation, the character of Sadan is based on Lucy.
1958	Dracula	Carol Marsh	Lucy is depicted as Arthur Holmwood's sister, renamed Lucy Holmwood, with Jonathan Harker being her fiancé. She becomes a victim, and later "bride" of Dracula as revenge against Jonathan for destroying his former bride. Lucy meets the same fate as her literary character, although she tries to attack Arthur before being destroyed. Hammer's adaptation has been recognized as the first one to faithfully adapt Lucy's storyline from the novel of falling ill, becoming a vampire, and then finally dying.
1968	Dracula	Susan George	Named Lucy Weston, she is depicted as taking an interest in Dracula, despite her engagement to Arthur. After becoming a vampire, she is the one who bites Mina.
1970	Count Dracula	Soledad Miranda	This version of Lucy is portrayed faithfully to her counterpart in the novel.
1971	Hrabě Drakula	Hana Maciuchová	Czechoslovak adaptation. Lucy's last name is never mentioned in this version.
1973	Dracula	Fiona Lewis	In Dan Curtis's television film, Lucy's character is depicted as the reincarnation of Dracula's wife. This film marks the first instance of the "reincarnation motif", depicting either Mina or Lucy as the Count's former wife, appearing in a Dracula adaptation.
1973	Dracula	Charlotte Blunt	In the 1973 Dracula episode of the Canadian Purple Playhouse TV series, Mina and Lucy are portrayed as sisters, with Lucy's full name being Lucy Murray.
1977	Count Dracula	Susan Penhaligon	In the BBC's adaptation, Mina is portrayed as a member of the Westenra family and Lucy's sister.
1979	Nosferatu the Vampyre	Martje Grohmann	A remake of the 1922 film Nosferatu. In this version, what was the Stoker's Lucy character is now named Mina, she is the one to be killed by vampire. What was Stoker's Mina character is now named Lucy Harker, she is wife of Jonathan Harker and Dracula’s second and main victim. She is played by Isabelle Adjani.
1979	Dracula	Jan Francis	In this version, what was the Stoker's Lucy character is now named Mina Van Helsing, she is the daughter of Dr Abraham Van Helsing. What was the Stoker's Mina character is now named Lucy Seward, the daughter of Dr Seward and fiancée of Jonathan Harker. This character survives Dracula's power and only momentarily becomes his bride. She is played by Kate Nelligan.
1992	Bram Stoker's Dracula	Sadie Frost	This version directed by Francis Ford Coppola eroticizes Lucy, making her more than seductive and coquettish, even tempting. She is drawn into Dracula's control because of her sleepwalking. She also has three suitors as in the novel.
1995	Dracula: Dead and Loving It	Lysette Anthony	The Mel Brooks's parody.
2002	Dracula	Muriel Baumeister	In this Italian miniseries in the English language (also known as Dracula's Curse) Lucy is a modern girl who wants to sleep in many beds in many cities, have new experiences and live for ever. She also has three suitors as in the novel.
2002	Dracula: Pages from a Virgin's Diary	Tara Birtwhistle	This is a black-and-white silent film/ballet version by Royal Winnipeg Ballet directed by Guy Maddin
2006	Dracula	Sophia Myles	Her character remained largely unchanged from the one in the novel, although she serves as an unintentional catalyst for events as her husband, Arthur Holmwood, arranges for Dracula to come to Britain in the hope that Dracula will be able to cure him of the syphilis that prevents him from consummating his marriage to Lucy.
2008	Dracula	Lakshmi	It's the 2008 Indian Telugu-language television series for Gemini TV.
2012	Dracula 3D	Asia Argento	In this version, the character is named Lucy Kisslinger and is daughter of the local mayor at the Transylvanian village.
2013	Dracula 2012	Priya Nambiar	It's the Indian Malayalam-language film. Her full name is Lucy Thomas.
2013	Dracula	Katie McGrath	In this version, Lucy Westenra is a closeted lesbian and harbors secret romantic feelings for Mina.
2020	Dracula	Lydia West	In the BBC's 2020 miniseries, Lucy Westenra is re-imagined as a modern, promiscuous party girl, and a willing victim/associate of Dracula. However, after she is cremated before she can awaken as a vampire, she spends a few hours apparently deluding herself into believing that she is still beautiful before she is forced to face her true appearance, after which she commits suicide.
2021	Bram Stoker's Van Helsing	Charlie Bond	Film focuses on Dracula's attacks on Lucy, her transformation into a vampire and her eventual staking.
2024	Nosferatu	Emma Corrin	A remake of the 1922 film. In this version, Lucy is renamed Anna Harding and is the pregnant wife of shipyard owner Friedrich Harding. Anna is infected with plague by Count Orlok (a renamed Dracula) to threaten Ellen Hutter (a renamed Mina) into reaffirming a pact she unwittingly made with him years ago. When Ellen does not comply, he kills Anna and the Harding children the following night; a grieving Friedrich also contracts plague and dies while kissing her entombed corpse.

==== Characters based on Lucy ====
- In 1970's Count Yorga, Vampire, a modern retelling of the Dracula story, a woman named Erica Landers (played by Judy Lang) plays a role similar to Lucy, being a good friend to the co-female lead, Donna (who resembles Mina's role), likewise being kind and perky before she is targeted by Yorga and bitten. She experiences erratic behavior after becoming stoic, feeding on her pet kitten, acting violent then seductive to her boyfriend, Paul, and becoming afraid of what she is becoming. Yorga ultimately feeds on Erica a second time, which kills her and transforms her into a vampire and one of his undead brides. Unlike Lucy, however, she survives to the end of the story even after her master is killed.
- In Mina and the Count series, Lucy Harper, protagonist's (Mina Harper) sister is based on Lucy.
- In Dracula 2000, singer Vitamin C played Lucy Westerman, one of Dracula's vampire victims then brides in 2000 New Orleans. The character shows no similarity to the original character from the book though and is not a modern adaptation of the character since the plot of the movie serves as sequel to original events, which happened in 1897 in London.
- In Michael Oblowitz's 2001 movie The Breed, Lucy Westenra, played by Bai Ling, is a wealthy beautiful vampire artist and has a human detective boyfriend.
- The 2019 mobile game Castlevania: Grimoire of Souls features the character Lucy Westenra, from the game's plot, who does not become a vampire. Instead, she remains untouched by the forces of darkness throughout her goal to aid the player in defeating Dracula. Coincidentally, she ends up associating with Dracula, albeit unknowingly.
- Ana Ilic portrayed Lucy in Dracula: The Original Living Vampire (2022). Here, Lucy is an eroticized character who only has a few scenes in the film, such as her being bitten and turned by Dracula. She is just some random victim of Dracula and has no personal connections with any of the main characters of the story.
- In the 2022 film The Invitation (loosely based on the novel), Lucy is portrayed by Alana Boden. Here she is portrayed as one of the brides at the wedding and already a vampire. She forms a bond with the protagonist, Evie, and ultimately sacrifices herself so she can escape.

=== On stage ===
- The first stage production was an adaptation by Stoker himself, performed only once, at the Lyceum Theatre on 18 May 1897 under the title Dracula, or The Undead; Miss Foster played the part of Lucy Westenra.
- In the 1924 play Dracula by Hamilton Deane the character is named Lucy Westera and she is already dead in the beginning of the play. In 1927 John L. Balderston revised the play for American audiences and the names of female characters were swapped. What was Lucy character is now named Mina Weston and she is also already dead at the beginning of the play. The Mina character is now named Lucy Seward, Dr Seward's daughter, who falls under Dracula's power but is saved from death at the end of the play. Dorothy Peterson originated the role of Lucy Seward in the Broadway production of the play.
- In the Argentinian Drácula, el musical, by Pepe Cibrián and Angel Mahler, Lucy was played by Paola Krum (1991 and 1992), Alejandra Radano (1994), Karina K (1997), Romina Groppo (2000), Georgina Frere (2003), Florencia Benítez (2007), Georgina Reynaldi (2007), Luna Perez Lening (2011).
- In The Transylvanian Clockworks by Don Nigro, Lucy was portrayed by Kate Twa.
- In Drácula Siglo XXI (2011) by Argentinian composer Pablo Flores Torres, she is played by Gabriela Moya Grgic
- In Dracula, The Musical, which opened on Broadway in 2004, Lucy Westenra was played by Kelli O'Hara.
- In 2006, Gabrielle Destroismaisons portrayed Lucy in a French Canadian musical production Dracula - Entre l'amour et la mort.
- In 2011, Anaïs Delva played the role of Lucy Westenra in the French musical Dracula – L'amour plus fort que la mort.
- In 2023, Ailsa Davidson played the role of Lucy Westenra in the National Theatre of Scotland production of Dracula: Mina's Reckoning
- In 2026 Caitlin Green played the role of Lucy Westerman, alongside Jp Stockwell’s Dr Seward as her Fiancé and Sen Saunders as her sister Mina Westerman, in a Liz Lochhead adaptation of Bram Stokers Dracula directed by Elara Heart. Noda praised her performance saying “ Her uninhibited and eccentric sister Lucy was beautifully brought to life by Caitlin Green, who really convinced us her strength was ebbing away from an unknown illness.”

=== In novels ===
- In December, 2010, Simon and Schuster (Gallery Books) released "The Secret History of Elizabeth Tudor, Vampire Slayer" purportedly as told to Lucy Weston.

=== In comics ===
- Lucy Westenra has several appearances in the Marvel Comics - mostly in retellings of the Dracula story, as compiled by Bram Stoker - and has (with her name occasionally misspelled) an entry in the Official Handbook of the Marvel Universe.
- Lucy is a central character in the WildStorm (later DC) comic, Victorian Undead 2: Sherlock Holmes vs Dracula. In the story, her human fate is the same as in the novel but the story deviates as her betrothed, Arthur Holmwood, helps spirit her body away before Van Helsing, Quincy Morris and Dr Seward can stake her, allowing her to become a vampire. Lucy allies with Dracula and attacks the heroes while overseeing a plague engineered by the Count. Holmes manages to wound her severely in the face with a flare, scarring her. To recover, Lucy betrays Arthur, feeds on and kills him to recover her features. When the hunters arrive at Dracula's hideout, she leads Dracula's Brides to attack the group. However, when two of the brides are killed, she offers a trade by killing the final bride for them in exchange for her life. She flees, but not before apologizing to Johnathan Harker about Mina's death (who, in this rendition, was bitten by Dracula and took her own life by sunlight to avoid becoming a vampire), claiming "she doesn't know what she's missing". The book ends with the vampiric Lucy still at large as the hunters focus on stopping Dracula from murdering the Queen of England.

=== Radio ===
In 1938, the CBS radio series The Mercury Theatre on the Air made its debut with Dracula. Lucy appears in the middle of the broadcast as the ill fiancée of Arthur Seward, and it is only later established that she is a victim of Dracula. Elizabeth Farrell performed as Lucy, opposite Orson Welles.
