= Hrabě Drakula =

- Directed by: Anna Procházková
- Screenplay by: Oldřich Železný, Anna Procházková
- Based on: based on Dracula by Bram Stoker
- Production company: Czechoslovak Television
- Release date: 22 July 1971
- Running time: 76 minutes
- Country: Czechoslovakia
- Language: Czech

Hrabě Drakula (Count Dracula) is a Czechoslovak 1971 black and white TV film adaptation of Bram Stoker's original novel Dracula.

This is the first adaptation of the novel to be directed by a woman (who also co-scripted the film).

== Plot ==
On behalf of his employer, Mr. Hawkins, Jonathan Harker travels to Transylvania to close a real estate transaction with Count Dracula. Jonathan keeps a written daily journal. Harker meets fearful, superstitious people on the coach to Bukovina. They are frightened at the mention of Dracula's name, and because Jonathan plans to go to the castle by night. A woman in the carriage gives him a crucifix. The coach only takes Jonathan so far, then Dracula's carriage picks him up. The Count himself, in disguise, drives the carriage. On their way to the castle, wolves chase the carriage. The Count sends them away. At the castle, the bearded and robust Count greets Jonathan. Dracula helps Jonathan with his bags and shows him to his room, making excuses for his servants' absence. Jonathan enjoys a supper in which the Count does not join him. Jonathan and Dracula discuss the sale of Carfax, the old London estate that the Count wants to buy. Dracula tells Jonathan he must stay at the castle for a while to help the Count perfect his English.

Jonathan cuts himself shaving, and in his shaving mirror, he notices that the Count has no reflection. The sight of the blood excites the Count, but the crucifix repulses him. Dracula takes Harker's mirror and tosses it out of the window. Jonathan soon realizes that he is alone at the castle with Dracula and that Dracula is not human. He wanders around the castle, falls asleep in one room, and is attacked by three vampire women - who refer to each other as Marquess, Countess, and Madame. Dracula stops their attack and gives the women a baby to feed on. The next evening Dracula tells Jonathan to write false letters home, in which he is to say that he already has left Transylvania. A woman comes to the castle, pleading for the return of her child, but wolves kill her. That night Jonathan sees Dracula climb head-first down the castle's wall. Getting desperate to find the key to the castle's front door and escape, Jonathan climbs out of his window and down an outer wall. He sees Romani loading coffins to the carriage in the yard. Jonathan soon finds a vault where the three vampire women repose in coffins, each in a deathlike trance. He finds the Count, also in a coffin in a similar state. Jonathan searches Dracula for the key. Unable to find it, he tries to kill the Count with a shovel but fails. Jonathan makes a desperate leap to escape.

Back in London, Jonathan celebrates being home from the hospital. He is among his friends- Arthur Holmwood and Lucy, Dr. John Seward, and Harker's wife, Mina. Jonathan is suffering from amnesia and has no recollection of what happened to him while he was abroad, and does not want to remember since he only knows that it was something unpleasant. Mina says that she hid his journal from him, so that he would not get upset by the memories. Lucy, meanwhile, is disappointed that he can't remember; she was looking forward to hearing what he had to say about the Carpathians since she shows interest in going there herself someday. She says she would like to borrow Jonathan's journal, and Lucy seems so impatient to do so she becomes agitated and passes out. Arthur reveals that Lucy suffers from a mysterious illness that left her pale and weak for three weeks. She also has two tiny wounds on her throat. Lucy's illness baffles Dr. Seward, so he sends for Professor Van Helsing to come from Holland to have a look at her. Van Helsing places garlic in Lucy's room and prescribes her garlic cream and peppermint tea. But Lucy removes the garlic, and Dracula enters her room. Lucy's mother, who was with her at that moment, dies of a heart attack. Lucy quickly fades away despite blood transfusion and beckons Arthur on her deathbed. Her teeth appear longer and sharper. Shortly afterward, Lucy dies and is buried. At Lucy's funeral, Mina suddenly turns around and then begins to walk towards something or somebody as if in a trance. Jonathan stops her and then sees the Count and recognizes him, but the Count vanishes. When Van Helsing asks him what's wrong, Jonathan says that he knows what's happened to him in the Carpathians and who is guilty of Lucy's death. Three nights after she was buried, Arthur is grieving in her room when he hears and sees Lucy calling to him outside. But Arthur understands that she is not Lucy anymore and repels her with garlic. Lucy leaves but wickedly promises Arthur that she will still get him, as he is still her groom. Van Helsing and others gather to discuss what they are to do now. Arthur tells them that Lucy came to him. Van Helsing shows them the newspaper, describing how three children have been kidnapped or wounded in the neck in the past few days after being kissed by a woman in white. While all the men are deeply concerned by this news, Mina is smiling strangely. Van Helsing tells them that they need to open the coffin of Lucy and cut her head off. Arthur is horrified and appalled, but Harker supports Professor. Van Helsing asks Jonathan to give him his journal, but when Harker asks his wife what she has done with it, Mina says she doesn't know what he is talking about. Jonathan finds the journal hidden among Mina's things, decides that she is tired and should go to bed.

Mina briefly touches her throat with her hand. Van Helsing leads Seward, Holmwood, and Harker to the graveyard by night. Inside the tomb, they find that Lucy's coffin is empty. Soon Lucy returns to the tomb carrying the child, which she drops when Van Helsing and others confront her. Lucy sweetly calls Arthur to come with her but retreats from Van Helsing's crucifix and returns to her tomb. Professor seals it, and they wait till daybreak. Then they re-enter Lucy's tomb, and Arthur stakes Lucy, while Van Helsing reads a prayer. A peaceful expression appears on Lucy's face, and Professor allows Arthur to kiss her.

Van Helsing and other men discuss what they know about their enemy, Dracula. Van Helsing has written to Budapest University and from the answer knows that Count Dracula is Voivode Dracula, who became famous in battles against the Turks. He also talks about the vampire's strengths and weaknesses, including the need to rest on his home soil and how Dracula wants to increase his undead empire by moving to London. They suddenly hear the laughter in the next room, run there, and find unconscious Mina on the floor. On her neck, they discover two wounds. The men go to Carfax, a place Harker sold to Dracula in London, and sterilize the boxes with communion wafers. However, two boxes are missing. Dracula confronts them there; Jonathan swings at him with his knife, but it only slashes the Count's coat, and gold coins spill out. Jonathan realizes that they left Mina at home completely alone.

Meanwhile, Dracula enters Mina's room, drinks her blood, then slashes his chest and makes her drink his blood, saying that now she belongs to him and if he tells her to come, she will go to him. The men burst in but are too late. Van Helsing tries to break Dracula's hold and presses a wafer to Mina's forehead, but it burns her. Professor understands that now they have to rely on Mina's psychic link to Dracula to learn where he is. They find out that Dracula is on the ship and is heading back to Transylvania. The heroes go by train to win time. When they reach Dracula's castle, Mina becomes excited, behaves as if she is at home, runs from Jonathan across the castle's halls, laughing wantonly and igniting the lights in the castle by the mere swish of her hand. The heroes spend the night in the castle, putting garlic wreaths as barriers in the room. Three vampire women appear, but they cannot enter the room. They call out to Mina, call her their sister, and promise to teach her lovely things, teach her to drink blood, promise to give her all those men who are with her now. Mina wants to go to them, but Arthur stops her. The next morning Van Helsing and Dr. Seward stake the three vampire women, and they crumble into dust.

After Dracula's wagon arrives, the Romani run away upon finding he is in the coffin-shaped box they have delivered. The men try to attack Dracula, but he gets away from them, telling Harker that Mina is his and coming with him. Mina runs off again, and Jonathan once more has to go chase her down. Dracula intercepts her with open arms, but Jonathan throws a dagger that pierces his heart. Dracula turns into dust, while the mark disappears from Mina's forehead. Jonathan's journal ends with a note that all these events happened seven years ago and that the castle still stands as it has before.

== Cast ==
- Ilja Racek - Count Dracula
- Jan Schánilec - Jonathan Harker
- Klára Jerneková - Mina Harker
- Jiří Zahajský - Arthur Holmwood
- Hana Maciuchová - Lucy
- Ota Sklenčka - Professor Van Helsing
- Václav Mareš - Dr. John Seward
- Olga Jirousková - Dracula's vampire bride
- Marie Joanovičová - Dracula's vampire bride
- Věra Křesadlová - Dracula's vampire bride

== Reception ==
The film has been found to be one of the most faithful adaptations of Stoker's novel.

== Legacy ==
It's the first adaption in which Mina's forehead gets burned by communion wafer, the first to show Van Helsing placing Mina under hypnosis and learning from her that Dracula has boarded a ship back to Transylvania, and the first to show the Brides of Dracula calling Mina "sister" and beckoning her to join them.
