= Abraham Van Helsing =

Fictional character created by Bram Stoker

- Dracula character
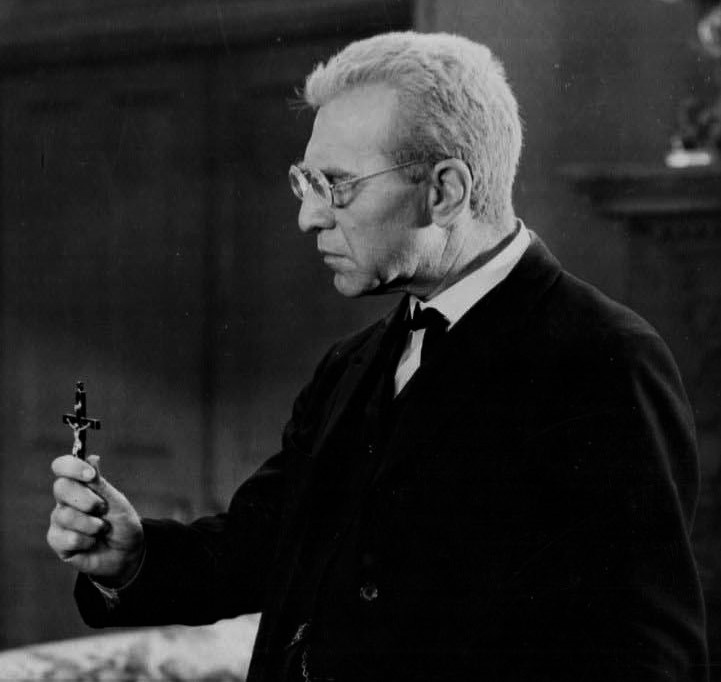
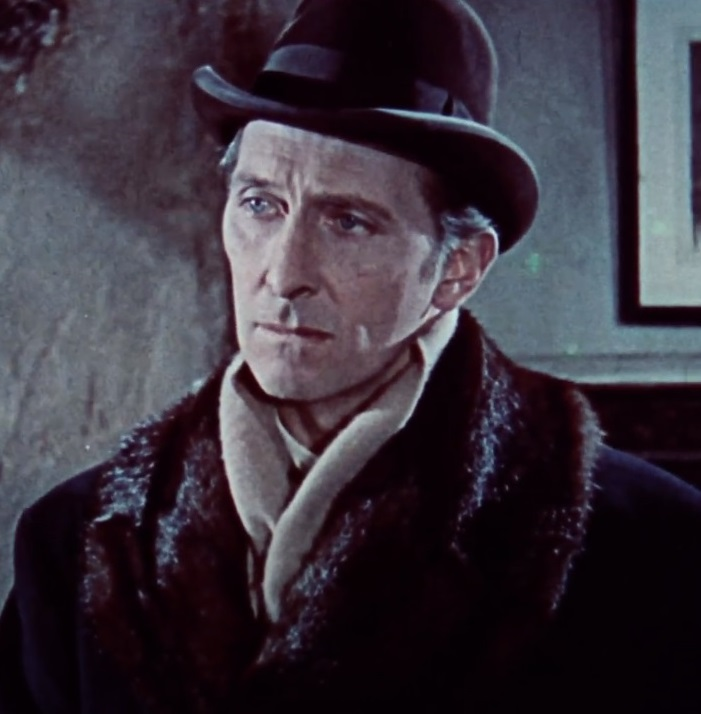
- First picture: Edward Van Sloan as Van Helsing in Dracula (1931); Second picture: Peter Cushing as Van Helsing in Dracula (1958)
- Created by: Bram Stoker

In-universe information
- Aliases: Van Helsing; Doctor Van Helsing; Professor Van Helsing
- Occupation: Professor, Doctor, Lawyer, Philosopher, Scientist, Metaphysician, and Vampire hunter
- Religion: Roman Catholic
- Nationality: Dutch
- Birthplace: Amsterdam, Netherlands

Professor Abraham Van Helsing (Dutch: [ˈaːbraːɦɑɱ vɑn ˈhɛlsɪŋ]) is a fictional character from the 1897 gothic horror novel Dracula written by Bram Stoker. Van Helsing is a Dutch polymath doctor with a wide range of interests and accomplishments, partly attested by the string of letters that follows his name: "MD, D.Ph., D.Litt., etc.", indicating a wealth of experience, education and expertise. He is a doctor, professor, lawyer, philosopher, scientist, medic, and metaphysician. He is able to speak three different languages: Dutch, English, and German. The character is best known through many adaptations of the story as a vampire slayer, monster hunter and the arch-nemesis of Count Dracula, and the prototypical and the archetypal parapsychologist in subsequent works of paranormal fiction. Some later works tell new stories about Van Helsing, while others, such as Dracula A.D. 1972 (1972), The Satanic Rites of Dracula (1973), Dracula (2020) and I Woke Up a Vampire (2023) have characters that are his descendants.

== Dracula ==
In the novel, Professor Van Helsing is called in by his former student, John Seward, to assist with the mysterious illness of Lucy Westenra. Van Helsing's friendship with Seward is based in part upon an unknown prior event in which Van Helsing suffered a grievous wound, and Seward saved his life by sucking out the gangrene. It is Van Helsing who first realizes that Lucy is the victim of a vampire, and he guides Seward and his friends in their efforts to save Lucy.

Van Helsing had a son who died. He says that his son, had he lived, would have had a similar appearance to Lucy's suitor Arthur Holmwood ("My heart bleed for that poor boy, that dear boy, so of the age of mine own boy had I been so blessed that he live, and with his hair and eyes the same"). Consequently, Van Helsing developed a particular fondness for Holmwood. Van Helsing's wife went insane from grief after their son's death, but as a Catholic, he refuses to divorce her ("with my poor wife dead to me, but alive by Church's law, though no wits, all gone, even I, who am faithful husband to this now-no-wife").

Van Helsing is one of the few characters in the novel who is fully physically described in one place. In chapter 14, Mina Harker describes him as:

a man of medium height, strongly built, with his shoulders set back over a broad, deep chest and a neck well balanced on the trunk as the head is on the neck. The poise of the head strikes me at once as indicative of thought and power. The head is noble, well-sized, broad, and large behind the ears. The face, clean-shaven, shows a hard, square chin, a large resolute, mobile mouth, a good-sized nose, rather straight, but with quick, sensitive nostrils, that seem to broaden as the big bushy brows come down and the mouth tightens. The forehead is broad and fine, rising at first almost straight and then sloping back above two bumps or ridges wide apart, such a forehead that the reddish hair cannot possibly tumble over it, but falls naturally back and to the sides. Big, dark blue eyes are set widely apart and are quick and tender or stern with the man's moods.

— Mina Harker's Journal, chapter 14, Dracula

Van Helsing's personality is described by John Seward, his former student, thus:

He is a seemingly arbitrary man, this is because he knows what he is talking about better than anyone else. He is a philosopher and a metaphysician, and one of the most advanced scientists of his day, and he has, I believe, an absolutely open mind. This, with an iron nerve, a temper of the ice-brook, and indomitable resolution, self-command, and toleration exalted from virtues to blessings, and the kindliest and truest heart that beats, these form his equipment for the noble work that he is doing for mankind, work both in theory and practice, for his views are as wide as his all-embracing sympathy.

— Letter From Dr Seward to Arthur Holmwood, chapter 9, Dracula

In the novel, Van Helsing is described as having what is apparently a thick foreign accent, in that he speaks in broken English and he uses German phrases such as "Mein Gott" (English: My God).

Adaptations of the novel have tended to play up Van Helsing's role as a vampire expert, sometimes to the extent that it is depicted as his major occupation. In the novel, however, Dr. Seward requests Van Helsing's assistance simply because Lucy's affliction has him baffled and Van Helsing "knows as much about obscure diseases as anyone in the world".

=== Development ===
In an 1897 interview in The British Weekly, Stoker said that Van Helsing was "founded on a real character". In Stoker's 1898 introduction to the Swedish and Icelandic versions of Dracula, he writes from an in-universe perspective that "the highly regarded scientist, who appears under a pseudonym here, may likewise be too famous throughout the educated world for his real name − which I prefer not to mention − to remain hidden from the public, especially from those people who have learned firsthand to appreciate and respect his brilliant mind and masterly skill, though they no more adhere to his views on life than I do."

Van Helsing may have been inspired by characters from Sheridan Le Fanu's Carmilla (1871–72), including Dr Martin Hesselius, "who makes little comment upon the strange narrative he introduces", and Baron Vordenburg, "who has read 'all the great and little works' on vampires and who has 'extracted a system of principles' that govern vampire existence".

=== Narrative ===
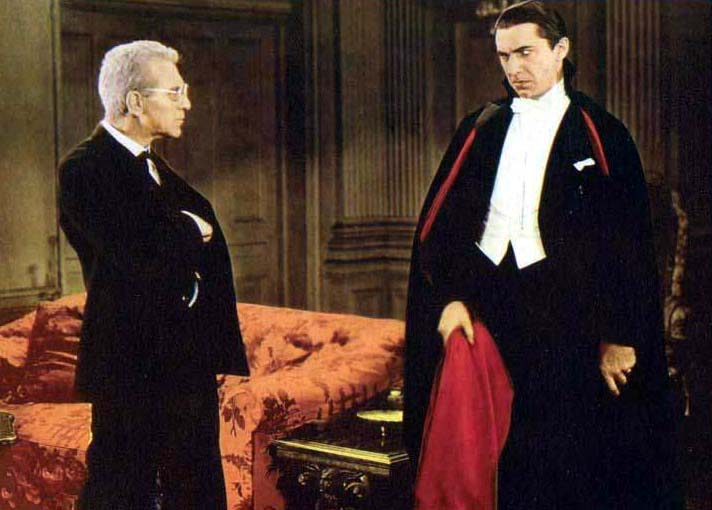
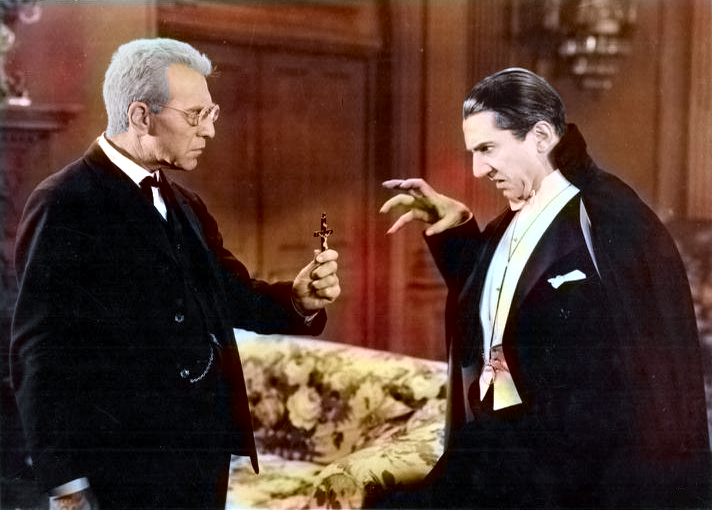
Colorized stills of Edward Van Sloan as Van Helsing confronting Béla Lugosi in Dracula (1931)

Count Dracula, having acquired ownership of the Carfax estate near London through solicitor Jonathan Harker, moves to the estate and begins menacing England. His victims include Lucy Westenra, who is on holiday in Whitby. The aristocratic girl has suitors such as John Seward, Arthur Holmwood, and Quincey Morris, and has a best friend in Mina Murray, Harker's fiancée. Seward, who works as a doctor in an insane asylum – where one of the patients, the incurably mad Renfield, has a psychic connection to Dracula – contacts Professor Van Helsing about Lucy's peculiar condition. Van Helsing, recognizing marks upon her neck, eventually deduces that she has been losing blood from a vampire bite. He administers multiple blood transfusions. Van Helsing, Seward, Arthur, and Morris each donate blood to her, but each night she continues to lose blood. He prescribes her garlic, makes a necklace of garlic flowers for her, and hangs garlic about her room. Lucy's demise was brought by her mother, who cleared the room of garlic and opened the window for fresh air, therefore inadvertently letting Dracula in. After Lucy's death, Van Helsing attempts to keep Lucy safe by placing a crucifix on her corpse, but it is stolen by a servant. After Lucy's funeral, she returns as a vampire, seeking out children. Eventually, Van Helsing, Arthur, Morris and Seward free the undead Lucy from her vampiric curse: Arthur uses a hammer to drive the stake through her heart and Van Helsing cuts off her head and puts garlic in her mouth.

Mina, now married to Harker, becomes increasingly worried about his brain fever. Van Helsing reviews his journal and Harker's health returns when he learns that his experiences in Transylvania were real. Mina discovers that various letters and accounts provide further intelligence on Dracula's movements, and shares these with Harker, Seward, Morris, and Van Helsing. They learn that Dracula's residence in Carfax is near Seward's, and Van Helsing's research reveals Dracula's weaknesses and strengths. Seward and Van Helsing also write to a university acquaintance to aid in further research. Staying at Seward's residence to better plan strategies in their efforts to deal with Dracula, they have frequent meetings and each member is assigned duties. At a later meeting a bat is seen at a window.

To destroy Dracula and prevent further spread of evil, the party enters his estate at Carfax and as a group encounters him for the first time. They discover that he has been purchasing properties in and around London, with plans to distribute 50 boxes of Transylvanian earth to them, used as graves so each property would become a safe lair. They visit these lairs and place sacramental bread in the boxes of the earth to "sterilize" them, preventing Dracula from further using them. Dracula entices Renfield to invite him into Seward's residence. Renfield is found critically injured by Seward and Van Helsing who operate on him, and Renfield informs them that Dracula went to see Mina. They go to Mina's room and find Harker hypnotized while Dracula is giving Mina the 'Vampire's Baptism of Blood', cursing her and the group for plotting against him. The party uses sacred items to repel Dracula, who transforms into a vapor and flees. He then destroys all the texts Mina had produced, except for one which was hidden.

Van Helsing places a wafer of sacramental bread upon Mina's forehead to bless her but it burns her flesh, leaving a scar. Mina, feeling that she is now connected with Dracula, asks Van Helsing to hypnotize her before dawn, the only time she feels she could freely speak. Through this hypnosis they learn that Mina has a telepathic link with Dracula, that she could tell everything he hears and feels, which could be used to track his movements. Mina agrees that any plans should be kept from her for fear that Dracula could read her thoughts. The group has additional encounters with Dracula as they continue to search for his residences throughout London and sterilize the boxes. Learning that his final grave is aboard a boat, Van Helsing deduces that Dracula is fleeing back to his castle.

When the party pursues Dracula to Transylvania, they split into groups. While Mina and Van Helsing travel straight to Dracula's castle, the others attempt to ambush the boat on which Dracula is a passenger. Van Helsing's influence over Mina diminishes each day, and her behavior changes as she sleeps more during the day, loses her appetite for food, and ceases to write in her journal. He finds that she cannot cross a circle of crumbled sacramental bread. Later, Dracula's vampiric wives approach their camp but they too are unable to cross into the circle of bread. Failing at their attempts to lure Van Helsing and Mina out of the circle, they flee back to Dracula's castle just before sunrise. Van Helsing binds Mina at a cave to keep her from danger as he goes into Dracula's castle to kill the vampires.

As Van Helsing runs through the castle searching its rooms, he finds Dracula's empty tomb and the three female vampires he saw earlier. He begins to do his operation on the first vampire but finds himself entranced by her beauty and unable to bring himself to harm her. In his feelings of enchantment, he even contemplates love for her. He is broken out of this enchantment when he hears a "soul wail" from Mina, awakening him. He proceeds to drive stakes into their hearts and sever their heads, one by one.

Van Helsing returns to Mina and they see the rest of their party as they chase a group of gypsies down the Borgo Pass and corner them. Armed with knives and firearms they overtake the gypsies and open the final box of Dracula; Jonathan Harker brings his Kukri knife down on Dracula's throat as the bowie knife of Quincey Morris simultaneously impales Dracula's heart in the final moments of daylight. At this moment Dracula's body crumbles to dust. After the struggle, Quincey is seen to have been fatally wounded.

Six years later, Van Helsing takes a grandfatherly role in regard to the young Quincey Harker, Jonathan and Mina's son.

== Equipment ==
Van Helsing is seen utilising many tools to aid him and his party in fending off Dracula, warding off vampires and in general defeating the undead:

- Skeleton keys used for lock picking to open the doors to many of Dracula's lairs located throughout London.
- Wreath of withered garlic blossoms
- Silver crucifix
- Sacred wafer brought from Amsterdam contained in an envelope or crushed and sprinkled around him in a circle as a protective barrier.
- Electric lamps which could be attached or secured against the chest.
- Revolver and knife for use against enemies weaker than Dracula.
- The branch of a wild rose could be placed on top of a coffin containing a vampire, immobilising it.
- Mountain ash used to repel the undead.
- Wooden stake and hammer to pierce a vampire's heart.
- Golden crucifix necklace, given to Lucy.

== On screen ==
=== Film adaptations of the novel ===
- Nosferatu, a Symphony of Horror (1922) was the first film version of Dracula. Although it followed the same basic plot as the novel, names were changed: Van Helsing is 'Professor Bulwer' (John Gottowt) and appears only in a few scenes. Unlike the book, he is a friend of 'Thomas Hutter' (the film's version of Jonathan Harker) before he meets 'Count Orlok' (a renamed Count Dracula), and he never meets the vampire face to face.
- In the initial 1931 Universal version of Dracula starring Béla Lugosi as the Count, Professor Van Helsing was portrayed by the actor Edward Van Sloan, who had previously played the part opposite Lugosi on stage. Van Sloan was the only cast member to reprise his role in the sequel Dracula's Daughter (1936). Additionally, archive footage from this film is used in the 2023 American action comedy horror film, Renfield.
- Eduardo Arozamena portrayed Van Helsing in Universal's simultaneously shot Spanish Dracula (1931).

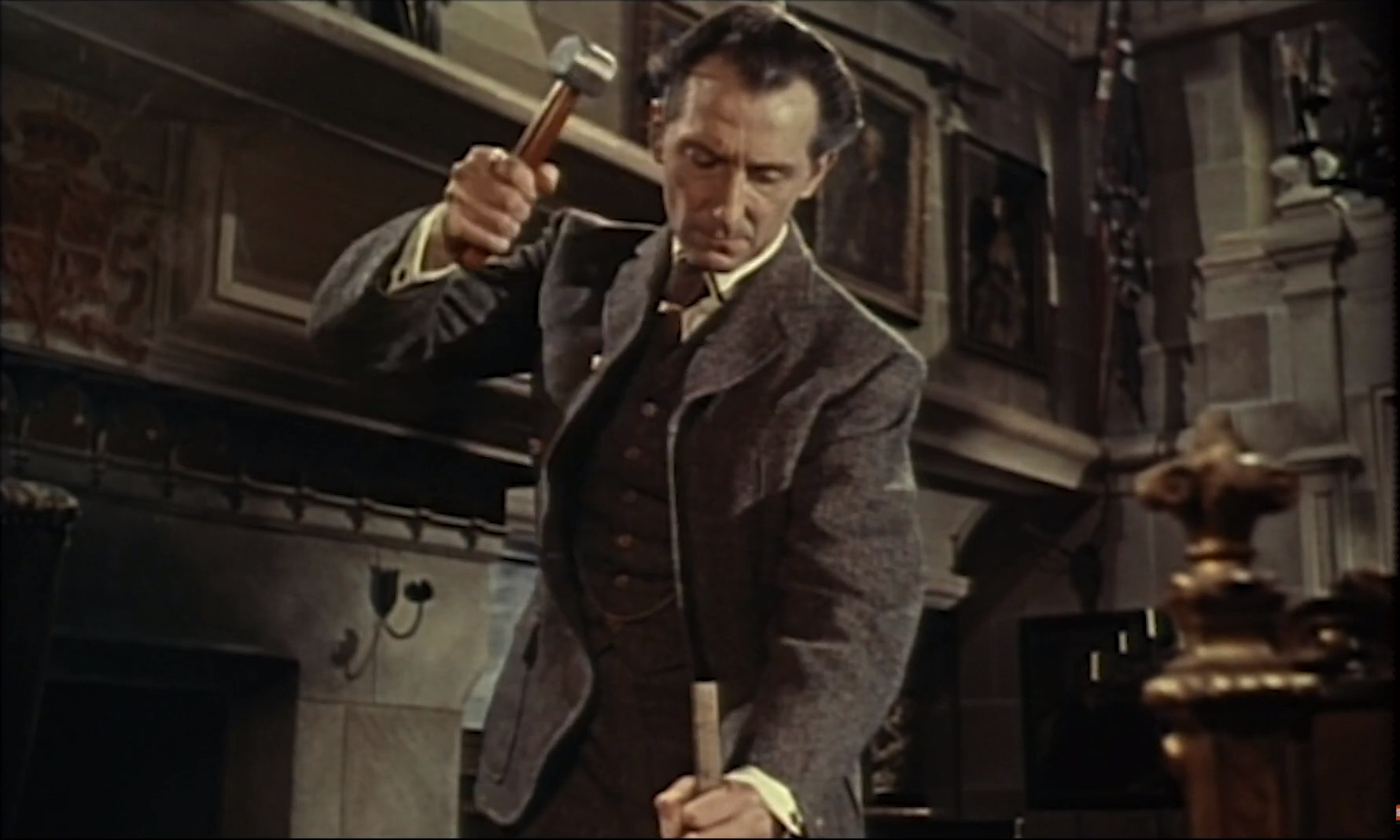
Peter Cushing as Van Helsing in The Brides of Dracula

- Peter Cushing's Doctor Van Helsing in the initial 1958 Hammer Dracula movie and its 1960 sequel The Brides of Dracula differed from the novel's in that the actor portrayed the character as a visibly younger man (as did Christopher Lee as the Count), and also one whose main vocation appears to be vampire hunting. His first name is never mentioned, though in the later Hammer Dracula films set in the 1970s (which apparently exist on a different timeline) Lee's Dracula battles Cushing's 'Lorrimer Van Helsing', a grandson of a previous vampire hunter, who appears as 'Lawrence Van Helsing' (also Cushing) in the prologue to Dracula A.D. 1972. In the final Hammer Dracula production The Legend of the 7 Golden Vampires (set mainly in 1904) Cushing again plays the original Van Helsing from the Hammer series.
- Herbert Lom played Van Helsing in Count Dracula (1970).
- Walter Ladengast played Van Helsing in Nosferatu the Vampyre (1979), a remake of the 1922 film. In this adaptation, Van Helsing is a physician who is committed to the principles of the Enlightenment and rejects the occult as pure superstition. As such, he initially disbelieves that Dracula is a vampire and does not assist the film's protagonist, Lucy, in combating him. Van Helsing only realizes his error at the end of the film, when he finds Dracula in a catatonic state beside the deceased Lucy. At this point, he drives a stake through the count's heart, but is arrested for murder by Wismar's townspeople at the urging of Jonathan Harker, who in this version has succumbed to vampirism himself.
- John Badham's 1979 version of Dracula saw Laurence Olivier portray Van Helsing as a frail old man whose daughter Mina becomes one of the undead, drawing him into a conflict with Frank Langella's Count that eventually costs the Professor his life.
- Anthony Hopkins portrayed Professor Van Helsing in Bram Stoker's Dracula in 1992. In this adaptation, Van Helsing is an extremely knowledgeable but eccentric and unpredictable scientist with a deep interest in the occult and experience combating vampirism. He is introduced delivering a lecture on sexually transmitted diseases in an anatomical theatre, implying that teaching medicine is his primary occupation. After coming into contact with Count Dracula, Van Helsing becomes the impromptu leader of the film's other, younger protagonists—including Jonathan Harker and others. He is shown to be a formidable fighter, using brutal methods to dispatch Lucy (who in this version succumbs to vampirism herself) and the brides of Dracula. Van Helsing spearheads the successful assault on Dracula's castle at the climax of the film.
- In the 1995 spoof film Dracula: Dead and Loving It, the movie's director Mel Brooks plays Professor Van Helsing. This version enjoys grossing out his medical students and is implied to be very familiar with Dracula, with him and the Count having a rather childish game of having the last word.
- David Moroni portrayed Van Helsing in Dracula: Pages from a Virgin's Diary (2002), a black and white movie version of the Royal Winnipeg ballet adaptation of the novel.
- Rutger Hauer in Dracula 3D (2012). In this version it is revealed that he used to control an insane asylum called Carfax, and it was there that he first encountered vampires.
- Keith Reay in Dracula Reborn (2012). The setting is modernized to present-day California and Van Helsing here is a relatively young and brutal vampire hunter, who is ready to kill people if they get in the way of vanquishing vampires.
- Mark Topping played Van Helsing in Bram Stoker's Van Helsing (2021). This film is dedicated to the part of the novel, which focuses on the illness and vampiric curse of Lucy Westenra, and her subsequent destruction as vampire.
- Christine Prouty in Dracula: The Original Living Vampire (2022). Here, Van Helsing is gender-swapped, now being a detective who is Mina's girlfriend, and a friend of chemist Jonathan Harker and Doctor Jack Seward. She does not believe in vampires and always relies on logic in contrast to Harker, who is convinced that there are vampires among them. She only believes this when she is forced to near the end of the film, and even then she is reluctant. After the battle with Dracula, it is revealed she has become a vampire.
- Willem Dafoe in Nosferatu, a remake of the 1922 film. This iteration, renamed Albin Eberhart Von Franz, is a scientist who fell from grace after devoting his studies to the occult. Von Franz is quick to recognize that Ellen (Mina's counterpart) is under the influence of Count Orlok (Dracula's analog) and conspires with her to defeat him, taking Thomas Hutter and Wilhelm Sievers (a renamed John Seward) to Orlok's manor while she sacrifices herself. While Von Franz, like Bulwer, does not meet Orlok face to face, he speaks with him while attempting to exorcise Ellen and encounters his corpse after his death.
- Christoph Waltz plays an unnamed priest based on Van Helsing in Dracula: A Love Tale in 2025.

=== TV adaptations of the novel ===
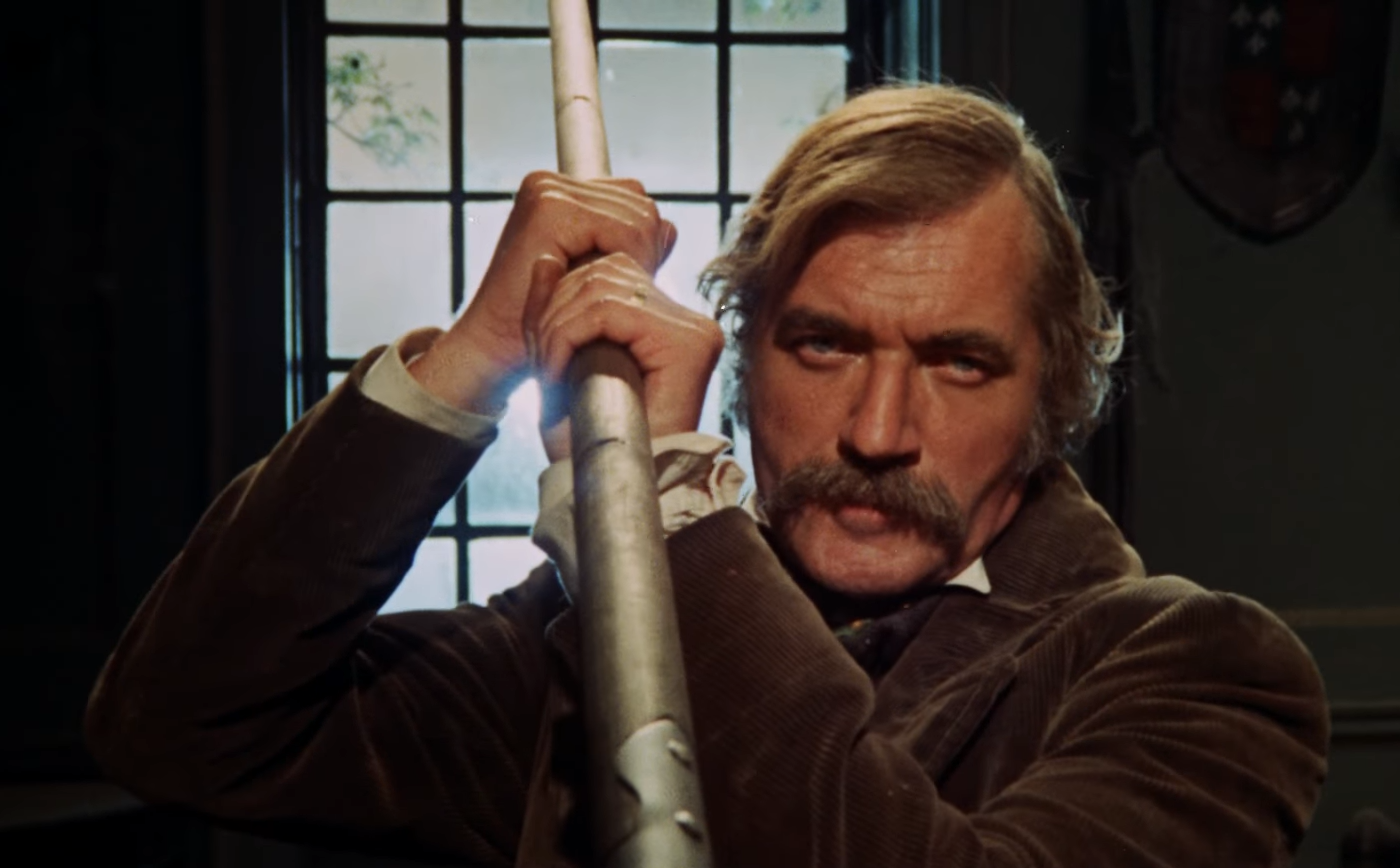
Van Helsing played by Nigel Davenport in Bram Stoker's Dracula.

- Bernard Archard in Dracula (1968)
- Ota Sklenčka in Hrabe Drakula (1971)
- Nehemiah Persoff in Dracula (1973)
- Nigel Davenport in Bram Stoker's Dracula (1974)
- Frank Finlay in the BBC adaptation Count Dracula (1977)
- Giancarlo Giannini (as Enrico Valenzi) in Dracula (2002)
- Captain Raju in the Asianet adaptation Dracula (2005)
- David Suchet in Dracula (2006)
- Thomas Kretschmann in Dracula (2013)
- Dolly Wells (as Sister Agatha Van Helsing / Zoe Van Helsing) in Dracula (2020)

=== Other screen appearances of the character ===
==== Films ====
- Jack Gwillim in the horror-comedy The Monster Squad (1987), in which Van Helsing opposes Duncan Regehr's Count Dracula.
- Peter Fonda in Nadja (1994)
- Christopher Plummer in Dracula 2000 (2000). After defeating Count Dracula (Gerard Butler), Van Helsing finds that the vampire lord cannot die by the conventional means of destroying a vampire and he only succeeded in paralyzing him in a deathlike state. When Dracula escapes after his coffin is stolen, Van Helsing's daughter and his assistant are able to defeat him after the elder Van Helsing's death.
- Hugh Jackman played Gabriel Van Helsing, in Van Helsing (2004) alongside costars Kate Beckinsale and Richard Roxburgh, loosely based on Stoker's character. Having been found on the steps of a church several years before with total amnesia, Gabriel hunts monsters for a secret organization made up of the world's religions (known as the Knights of the Holy Order) to rid the world of evil "that the rest of mankind has no idea exists", although he is the most wanted man in Europe for his conspicuous actions. In the movie he is sent to Transylvania to kill Count Dracula. When he arrives, Dracula tells Gabriel that they have already met and have quite a history together, with Dracula revealing over the course of the film that Van Helsing was the one who originally murdered him, as well as claiming ownership of a distinctive ring that Van Helsing has worn as long as he can remember. It is heavily implied that Gabriel is actually the angel Gabriel, with vague references to Dracula's murderer as the "Left Hand of God". Jackman also voiced the character in the animated spin-off Van Helsing: The London Assignment (2004).
- David Carradine in The Last Sect (2006).
- Wallace Shawn in Vamps (2012).
- It was announced on 6 December 2020 that Julius Avery is set to direct a Van Helsing movie reboot for Universal Pictures, with James Wan producing the horror-thriller.
- Titus Welliver in Abraham's Boys (2025). This is an American horror film based on the short story of the same name by Joe Hill, which presents itself as a sequel to the Dracula novel. Taking place nearly 2 decades after the events of the novel, Van Helsing married Mina Harker after the death of her first husband. The pair have two teen sons, Max and Rudy, and moved to California to escape the influence of vampires. Through the course of the film audience is invited to doubt if the events of the novel truly happened and Van Helsing was slaying vampires or if Van Helsing was delusional fanatic and was killing real humans claiming they were vampires.

==== Television ====
- David Warner in Penny Dreadful (2014), a hematologist consulted by Victor Frankenstein. He eventually admits he has known about vampires for some time and offers to give Frankenstein some much-needed instruction in the area.
- Michael Eklund in Van Helsing (2019), original patriarch of the Van Helsing family who managed to previously trap the Dark One and meets with his descendant Vanessa Van Helsing.
- A procedural in a contemporary New York City with Van Helsing as a crime fighter alongside his ex Mina Harker as an FBI special agent is in the development at CBS and Lionsgate Television.

== Appearances in other media ==
=== On stage ===
- In 1924 play Dracula by Hamilton Deane Van Helsing is portrayed as the arch-nemesis of Dracula. Deane himself played the role in British productions of the play. In 1927 the play was brought to Broadway by producer Horace Liveright, who hired John L. Balderston to revise the script for American audiences. The role of Van Helsing on Broadway was played by Edward Van Sloan. It is due to this play and its adaptation into 1931 film, that the notion of Van Helsing as Dracula's arch-enemy was introduced into popular culture (in the novel the two never had any conversations and Dracula never singled out Van Helsing out of the group of people who were after him).
- Van Helsing was played by Stephen Henderson in 2004 Broadway production of Dracula, the Musical by Frank Wildhorn.
- Van Helsing was played by Pierre Flynn in the 2006 French Canadian musical Dracula – Entre l'amour et la mort.
- Van Helsing was played by Aymeric Ribot in the 2011 French musical Dracula, l'amour plus fort que la mort.
- Van Helsing was portrayed by Ashley Dixon in the 2019 Northern Ballet's production of Dracula by David Nixon. The production was recorded and showed in UK cinemas on Halloween and then broadcast on BBC4 in 2020.

=== Novels ===
- The Robert Statzer novel To Love a Vampire (ISBN 978-1721227310) chronicles Van Helsing's days as a medical student, depicting his first confrontation with the occult during an encounter with Countess Elizabeth Báthory and her niece, Carmilla Karnstein. Originally published as a serial in the pages of Scary Monsters Magazine from March 2011 to June 2013, a revised version of To Love a Vampire was reprinted in paperback and Kindle editions in June 2018.
- In the 2009 Dacre Stoker novel Dracula the Un-dead, Van Helsing is now a 75-year-old man with heart problems, having apparently been disgraced in the medical profession for deaths caused by improper blood transfusions (although he defends his reputation by arguing that nobody knew about blood types until much later); he was also briefly a suspect in the Jack the Ripper murders due to his knowledge of anatomy and reputation for mutilating corpses for unspecified reasons. He later becomes a vampire himself after a meeting with Dracula revealed that Dracula was actually hunting the true monster of Elizabeth Báthory, but Van Helsing is killed in a confrontation with Arthur Holmwood, as Holmwood cannot accept the revelation that they were hunting the wrong threat. Holmwood throws himself at Van Helsing, causing the pair to fall out of a window and be impaled on the fence below.
- P. N. Elrod's novel Quincey Morris, Vampire takes up the story almost immediately after the conclusion of Bram Stoker's Dracula, but in this story (which shows vampires in a more sympathetic light) Van Helsing is unyielding and unwavering in his beliefs and his hatred of vampires to the point where he eventually alienates his former friends and allies.
- In Edward M. Erdelac's 2012 epistolary novel, Terovolas, Van Helsing suffers a bout of madness stemming from his encounter with Dracula's brides, and commits himself to Seward's care. Upon release, he voluntarily bears the personal effects of Quincey Morris back to the Morris family ranch in Texas, only to be embroiled in more supernatural doings related to a group of enigmatic Norwegian ranchers.
- The comic novel Dracula's Diary by Michael Geare and Michael Corby (ISBN 978-0825301438) completely re-tells the Stoker novel, with the young Count Dracula (who has been learning to act like a true British gentleman) becoming a secret agent for Her Majesty's government and Van Helsing an enemy agent for a foreign power who is continually thwarted by Dracula.
- In The Dracula Tapes (1975) by Fred Saberhagen, a psychotic, fanatical, bumbling Van Helsing opposes the urbane, if ruthless, Dracula.
- In Fangland by John Marks, the re-imagined Van Helsing is split into two separate characters, namely Clementine Spence and Austen Trotta.
- He also appears in the Department 19 series by Will Hill.
- In the 2017 novel A Betrayal in Blood by Mark A. Lathan, Mycroft Holmes asks his brother Sherlock to investigate Van Helsing's 'Crew of Light' after they have been cleared of murder charges due to Dracula's vampiric nature. In the course of the investigation, Holmes and Dr. Watson realize that Van Helsing is actually a 'retired' German spy who manipulated Seward and the Harkers in assisting his campaign against Dracula, Seward through his loyalty and the Harkers through blackmail of their role in the death of Jonathan's former employer. He also arranged for the death of Quincey Morris, and is all but explicitly stated to have manipulated Holmwood into his new marriage to a woman who owes Van Helsing unspecified favours. Holmes deduces that in reality, Dracula was never a vampire; Van Helsing faked all relevant evidence, such as hiring an actress with a passing resemblance to Lucy to attack children after her death. In reality Dracula was a reclusive old man and a former spy himself, whose only crime was a long-ago affair with Van Helsing's wife, this affair producing a son who was given up for adoption to become Arthur Holmwood. At the conclusion of the case, Van Helsing commits suicide by shooting himself in a train bathroom while Holmes and Watson are taking him back to England to stand trial after a final confrontation in Translyvania.
- At the end of the novel Dracul, the official prequel to the novel by Bram Stoker co-written by Dacre Stoker and J. D. Barker, it is suggested by a dialogue between Bram Stoker and Mina Harker that Van Helsing and Ármin Vámbéry could be the same person.

=== Radio and audio ===
- In radio drama Dracula by The Mercury Theatre on the Air, which was broadcast in 1938, Van Helsing was played by Martin Gabel. Dracula was played by Orson Welles.
- In the Big Finish Productions audio drama The Tangled Skein (adapted from the novella by David Stuart Davies) Van Helsing, acting alone, joins forces with Sherlock Holmes and Dr. Watson to investigate the presence of vampires in London. Although initially disbelieving of Van Helsing's convictions when they read about his lectures on vampires, the duo accept his word when they are confronted and nearly killed by a vampire in Hampstead Heath, joining Van Helsing in staking the vampire. While Van Helsing is forced to focus on his lectures over the next few days, he leaves his vampire-hunting equipment with Holmes and Watson, who track Dracula to Dartmoor, where he has hidden in Baskerville Hall, and are able to defeat him using Van Helsing's advice. After Dracula is defeated when trapped in the Grimpen Mire as the sun rises, Holmes gives Van Helsing Dracula's ring as a memento of their victory, concluding that Van Helsing's research is what enabled him to destroy Dracula.

=== Comics ===
Dracula and Rachel Van Helsing: The Tomb of Dracula No. 40 (Jan. 1976). Art by Gene Colan and Tom Palmer.

Abraham Van Helsing was also portrayed in The Tomb of Dracula Marvel Comics series, which was based on the characters of Bram Stoker's novel including his great-granddaughter Rachel Van Helsing.

In the Marvel Comics miniseries X-Men: Apocalypse vs. Dracula, Van Helsing joins forces with the immortal mutant Apocalypse and his worshipers, Clan Akkaba, to destroy Dracula, their common enemy. Van Helsing had encountered Apocalypse before and previously believed him to be a vampire.

In the Italian comic book Martin Mystère and the spin-off series Storie di Altrove/Stories from Elsewhere, Van Helsing's name is Richard. He was originally a knight in the service of the Holy Roman Emperors but he was captured in 1475 by the undead warriors of the Order of the Dragon and turned into a vampire by the Wallachian Prince Vlad Dracula. Four centuries later, Van Helsing killed Dracula, and later came to London to solve the case of Jack the Ripper, eventually discovering that the murderers were mentally controlled by demons from another world. In 1902 he worked together with the resurrected Dracula to prevent the assassination of King Edward VII.

== Media involving Van Helsing's descendants ==
There have been numerous works of fiction depicting descendants of Van Helsing carrying on the family tradition.

=== Films ===
- Some of Hammer's Dracula films feature other members of the Van Helsing family alongside Peter Cushing as the Doctor; The Legend of the 7 Golden Vampires (1974), set in the early 1900s, features his son 'Leyland', played by Robin Stewart alongside the original Van Helsing played by Cushing. Meanwhile, the film Dracula AD 1972, which is a reboot of the Hammer timeline, features Lorrimer Van Helsing, a descendant of Lawrence Van Helsing (based on Abraham), who himself has a granddaughter named Jessica. Lorrimer and Jessica appear in both Dracula A.D. 1972, played by Peter Cushing and Stephanie Beacham respectively, and The Satanic Rites of Dracula, where Jessica is instead played by Joanna Lumley.
- The 1979 film Love at First Bite, is a comedic parody in which Dracula falls in love, and Jeffrey Rosenberg, grandson of Fritz Van Helsing, tries to kill him.
- In the 1989 film Sundown: The Vampire in Retreat, Bruce Campbell plays Robert Van Helsing, the great-grandson of Abraham Van Helsing.
- In the 2000 film Dracula 2000, Justine Waddell plays Van Helsing's daughter Mary.
- In the 2000 Disney channel movie Mom's Got a Date with a Vampire, Malachi Van Helsing is hunting the vampire Dimitri, who is preying on the mother of the main characters.
- The 2004 direct-to-video film Dracula 3000 features Captain Abraham Van Helsing (played by Casper Van Dien), a descendant of the original Van Helsing and the captain of a spacefaring salvage ship.
- The 2004 direct-to-video film The Adventures of Young Van Helsing depicts Abraham Van Helsing's great-grandson Michael (Keith Jordan) saving the world from Simon Magus.
- The 2006 film Bram Stoker's Dracula's Curse features a character named Jacob Van Helsing (Rhett Giles), who is implied to be a descendant of the original.
- The 2009 film Stan Helsing is a comedic film revolving around satirizing the Van Helsing descendant of the 2004 feature film.
- In the 2012 TV film, Scooby-Doo! Music of the Vampire, a book writer named Vincent van Helsing is the great-great-grandson of Abraham Van Helsing.
- In the 2013 film Dracula: The Dark Prince Van Helsing's 16th-century ancestor Leonardo is played by Jon Voight.
- Abraham Van Helsing appears in the 2018 movie Hotel Transylvania 3: Summer Vacation voiced by Jim Gaffigan. Besides being Count Dracula's arch-nemesis, Van Helsing managed to have a great-granddaughter named Ericka Van Helsing (voiced by Kathryn Hahn), the captain of the ship central to the film. By the present day, Abraham has been mechanized to avoid death where only his head and hands remained. Dracula falls in love with Ericka not knowing she is descended from his old arch-enemy until the climax. The movie's prologue also involves Van Helsing making numerous comedic attempts to kill Dracula. Van Helsing returns in a secondary role in the 2022 sequel, Hotel Transylvania: Transformania.
- It was announced on 20 May 2020, that Peter Dinklage and Jason Momoa are to star in a vampire action-adventure movie Good, Bad & Undead.

=== Television ===
- The Thames Television 1988–1993 children's animation Count Duckula featured the character Dr. Von Goosewing, voiced by Jimmy Hibbert. A mad scientist and vampire hunter, Von Goosewing is a parody of Van Helsing. He is a goose that speaks in a German accent, and wears an outfit not unlike that of Sherlock Holmes. He pursues Count Duckula relentlessly, never able to comprehend that Duckula is actually completely harmless. He is a terrible scientist, often getting injured by his own crackpot inventions, and he is supremely unobservant, often bumping into Duckula and conversing with him for several minutes without realising to whom he is speaking.
- The 1990 series Dracula: The Series had Bernard Behrens as Gustav Helsing. He was looking after his two nephews, Christopher Townsend and Max Townsend. They fought Dracula, who in the contemporary world, had taken on the name of Alexander Lucard. In this version Gustav Helsing's son, Klaus Helsing (Geraint Wyn Davies), had been turned into a vampire by Alexander Lucard (Dracula).
- The 2006 CBBC series, Young Dracula, featured Mr. Eric Van Helsing – presumably the descendant of his more famous predecessor, though with none of his competence – trying to exterminate Count Dracula and his children, who had been chased out of Transylvania by an angry mob and were now living in rural Wales. Eric lives in a caravan with his son Jonathan. There are also references made to previous Van Helsing vampire slayers.
- The 2006 series Tom and Jerry Tales episode Monster Con, Van Helsing appears with Tom and uses some of his equipment to catch Jerry, but catches a few ghosts instead and turns into a werewolf cat when he is bitten by Jerry's friend, the werewolf.
- The 2009 ITV series Demons follows Abraham's great-grandson Luke Rutherford (Christian Cooke).
- Syfy is airing a Van Helsing episodic television series with Neil LaBute as creator. The lead character is Vanessa Van Helsing (Kelly Overton), said to be great-great-great-granddaughter of Abraham Van Helsing. Abraham Van Helsing appears in the fourth season and other characters related to him have appeared as well.
- In the 2019 FX series What We Do in the Shadows, Guillermo, the devoted human familiar of Nandor the Relentless in Staten Island, who has accidentally killed two vampires, finds out through a DNA test that one of his ancestors was named Van Helsing. Horrified, he says "Van Helsing isn't real" but then reasons "Vampires are real." In season 2, he struggles with his ancestry which has made him an extremely adept vampire slayer, killing dozens in order to protect his master by the end of season 2.

=== Books and stories ===
- The short story Abraham's Boys by Joe Hill is about the retired Abraham Van Helsing and his two sons, and how he passes along his knowledge to them. The story is included in the anthology The Many Faces of Van Helsing.
- According to The Vampire Hunter's Handbook, Abraham was not the first Van Helsing to encounter vampires. The book is supposedly written by Raphael Van Helsing in the 18th century. It has also been prequeled by The Demon Hunter's Handbook by Abelard Van Helsing (16th century) and The Dragon Hunter's Handbook by Adelia Vin Helsin (14th century). The supposed writers refer to each other (in the cases where it makes sense) and other Van Helsings.
- Similar to the above-mentioned handbooks is Vampyre: The Terrifying Lost Journal of Dr. Cornelius Van Helsing which is written by Mary-Jane Knight but credited to Dr. Cornelius Van Helsing. The book implies that Cornelius is the brother of Abraham.
- Young Dracula by Michael Lawrence mentions a farmer named Dweeb Van Helsing.
- In Den hemliga boken and sequels by Jesper Tillberg and Peter Bergting, the main character is Abraham's great-grandson Lennart Van Helsing (not to be confused with Lennart Hellsing).
- Van Helsing's Gazette is repeatedly referred to in Jasper Fforde's Thursday Next novels.

=== Anime and manga ===
- In the manga and anime, Hellsing, modern day descendant Integra Hellsing leads a British government strike force against supernatural menaces. The story also includes her father, Arthur and uncle, Richard. It later turns out that the protagonist Alucard is in fact Dracula, and has become a servant to the Helsing family after being defeated by Integra's grandfather, Abraham Van Helsing. In this incarnation however, the Van Hellsings are Protestant rather than Roman Catholic.
- Abraham Van Helsing is also a character in the Code: Realize anime.

=== Comics and graphic novels ===
- The comic book series The Tomb of Dracula featured Rachel Van Helsing, granddaughter of Abraham, as a major member of the principal vampire hunters. Minor characters were Abraham's wife Elizabeth and his brother Boris.
- The DC comic Night Force features Abraham's granddaughter Vanessa Van Helsing.
- Sword of Dracula is a comic book with Veronica "Ronnie" Van Helsing.
- Helsing is a Caliber Comics title about a Samantha Helsing and a John Van Helsing.
- The Vampirella comic books feature father-son vampire hunters Conrad and Adam Van Helsing.
- In The League of Extraordinary Gentlemen, Van Helsing and the story of Dracula is hinted by main character Mina Murray (Dracula's chosen bride in the novel).
- Zenescope Entertainment's Helsing graphic novels (about a Liesl van Helsing) are credited as the inspiration for Van Helsing (TV series).

=== Games ===
- Gabriel Van Helsing is featured in the 2004 video game, Van Helsing. The player uses the character to hunt down Dracula in Transylvania.
- In 2011, Team Fortress 2 added via update a costume set for the Sniper class, named 'Camper Van Helsing' which can only be used for Halloween events. Three years later, a similar costume set for the Soldier was added with the same Halloween limitations, named the 'Sgt. Helsing'.
- The 2013 game, The Incredible Adventures of Van Helsing, focuses on the trials of young Van Helsing, son of the legendary vampire hunter Abraham Van Helsing.
- Van Helsing was adapted as a character in MechQuest, where he plays a professional mech vampire hunter. He is portrayed as having a brother, another hunter, who looks identical to him and eventually replaces him.
- Van Helsing is a potential love interest for the protagonist in the otome visual novel Code: Realize ~Guardian of Rebirth~
- Van Helsing and Dracula were portrayed as tanks in World of Tanks Blitz, a popular online tank warfare game. Van Helsing was portrayed as a royal-looking tank destroyer with elaborate designs and scenes from the book on the side of the tank. Dracula is portrayed as a medium tank in pure black, very fast, and with no designs on it. The tanks were available in the 2016 Halloween Event.
- Van Helsing was portrayed, along with others from the book, in The Fury of Dracula, a game where the hunters must track down and kill Dracula.
- In the 2016 first-person shooter game Overwatch the character Cole Cassidy portrays him in an event-specific skin of the same name.
- In 2017, the visual novel game "Lovestruck: Choose Your Romance," by the now defunct North American branch of Voltage, released the story "Havenfall is For Lovers," in which one of the possible Love Interests is Vanessa Helsing, who is mentioned to be a descendant of Van Helsing.
- In the 2021 expansion for Magic the Gathering known as "Innistrad: Crimson Vow", the card Savior of Ollenbeck has an alternate art version called Abraham Van Helsing.
- Terrordrome: Reign of the Legends features Alex Van Helsing as a playable character.
