= Fangland =

2007 novel by John Marks

- Author: John Marks
- Language: English
- Genre: Thriller; Horror; Suspense
- Publisher: Penguin Press / Penguin Putnam
- Publication date: January 15, 2007
- Publication place: United States
- Media type: Print (hardback)
- Pages: 388 pp
- ISBN: 978-1-59420-117-2
- OCLC: 70630646
- Dewey Decimal: 813/.54 22
- LC Class: PS3563.A66655 F36 2007

Fangland is a 2007 novel written by John Marks, a former producer for 60 Minutes. It is a reimagined version of Dracula by Bram Stoker, set in a post-9/11 New York. Like Dracula, Fangland is written in parts as an epistolary novel through e-mails, diary entries and letters. It received a World Fantasy Award nomination.

== Plot summary ==
The story begins with Evangeline Harker, an associate producer of the television news program, The Hour, and the daughter of a rich Texan magnate. Harker is tasked with investigating the notorious Eastern European crime lord Ion Torgu in Romania, to see if there is a story for The Hour there. She reluctantly accepts and travels to Transylvania where she meets Clementine Spence, a fellow American who tries to warn her about things beyond natural comprehension.

After meeting with Torgu, Evangeline is convinced to accompany him to a remote hotel. While Evangeline encounters horrors at the hotel, she goes missing in the eyes of the world. Meanwhile, mysterious tapes are delivered to the offices of The Hours, infecting the entire audio system with a strange noise.

== Characters ==
- Evangeline Harker: daughter of a Texan oil magnate, who works as an associate producer on The Hour and who is sent to Transylvania to scout a possible story on Ion Torgu. She slowly becomes insane as she is held hostage by Torgu and finally manages to escape from his estate. She is saved by Clemmie Spence, whom she travels with for some time and ends up becoming her lesbian partner and eventually murdering her. Meanwhile, she discovers symbols appearing on her body as she is slowly becoming a vampire. She is eventually found by the officials in a Transylvanian monastery, with her memories partially suppressed. She returns to New York only to face Torgu again. The character is based on Jonathan Harker and Mina Murray.
- Ion Torgu: The antagonist of the novel, based on Count Dracula. While apparently a vampire, Torgu does not have fangs and is unafraid of sunlight. His main gift is communicating with the dead through drinking human blood, which he apparently wishes to share with the whole world. He speaks enigmatically of his past and seems to be terrified of human sexuality.
- Clementine "Clemmie" Spence: A young, blond, fellow American missionary with a troubled past. She rescues Evangeline after her first encounter with Torgu, and is revealed to be an agent for an apparently witch-hunting organization called World Ministries Central, which is investigating Ion Torgu. Clemmie is partially based on both Van Helsing and Lucy Westenra.
- Austen Trotta: One of the head businessmen at The Hour serving as long-time correspondent. He is at first oblivious to what is going on around him in the newsroom, although he is greatly concerned about the safety of his associate producer. Also based on Van Helsing.
- Julia Barnes: A competent, clear-headed woman who is an ex-rebel turned editor at The Hour. She teams up with Trotta and Sally Benchborn against Torgu's overtaking of the offices.
- Stimson Beevers: A young, geeky production associate who is secretly in love with Evangeline. After her disappearance he tries desperately to reach her through the e-mail, only to be answered by Torgu impersonating her. Slowly driven insane by Torgu's influence, he ends up trying to murder Evangeline's fiancé. Based on Renfield.
- Sally Benchborn: Producer and Civil War re-enactor.
- Ian: Evangeline's coworker and friend who dies shortly after her departure and communicates with her as a ghost later in the novel.
- Robert: Evangeline Harker's fiancé, who is attacked and nearly killed by Torgu.
- Mr. Harker: Evangeline's father, a wealthy Texan oil magnate.
- James O'Malley: while absent from the novel's plot, O'Malley is the creator of the report which essentially is the novel, as well as the author of certain parts of it. He is Evangeline's former boss and is mentioned to have had a short-lived affair with her. The prologue indicates that the report also serves as a suicide note for him, while the epilogue implies that he is being visited by Evangeline.

== Film adaptation ==
A film adaptation was announced in 2007, with Hilary Swank involved. Mark Wheaton wrote the first draft of the adaptation before the Writers Guild of America strike, and the 2008 financial crisis. and John Carpenter was hired to direct, while Sriram Das and Jason Blum produced the film for Blumhouse Prods. However, Swank is not involved. The film has since been abandoned.
