= Rhiannon Frater =

American author of horror fiction

Rhiannon Frater is an American author of horror fiction. She lives in Texas.

Frater is best known for her As the World Dies trilogy, which she initially self-published and then revised and expanded for publication by Tor Books. The books are about survivors during a zombie plague. The first book in the series, The First Days, received a starred review from Publishers Weekly.

== Books ==
=== As the World Dies Trilogy ===
1. The First Days, self-published 2008, revised edition published by Tor Books 2011
2. Fighting to Survive, self-published 2009, Tor Books 2013
3. Siege, self-published 2009, Tor Books 2013
4. After Siege, published 7 August 2020

=== As the World Dies Untold Tales ===
- As the World Dies: Untold Tales Volume 1, CreateSpace, 2011
- As The World Dies: Untold Tales Volume 2, CreateSpace, 2012
- As The World Dies: Untold Tales Volume 3, CreateSpace, 2013
- The Untold Tales Omnibus: Zombie Stories from the As the World Dies Universe, 2014

=== Pretty When She Dies ===
1. Pretty When She Dies, CreateSpace, 2008
2. Pretty When She Kills, CreateSpace, 2012
3. Pretty When She Destroys, CreateSpace, 2013

=== Vampire Bride ===
1. The Tale of the Vampire Bride, self-published, 2009
2. The Vengeance of the Vampire Bride, self-published, 2011

=== In Darkness We Must Abide ===
1. Death Comes Home, 2013
2. Death in the Shadows, 2013
3. The Arrival of Armando DeLeon, 2013
4. The Gift, 2013
5. The Vampires, 2013
6. Dire Warnings, 2013
7. Destruction, 2013
8. The Fallen King, 2013
9. The Purge, 2013
10. Betrayal, 2013
11. Into the Temple of Shadows, 2014
12. Journey Into the White, 2014
- In Darkness We Must Abide: The Complete First Season, 2013
- In Darkness We Must Abide: The Complete Second Season, 2013

=== Other books ===
- The Living Dead Boy, self-published, 2010
- The Last Bastion of the Living, self-published, 2012
- Blood & Love and Other Vampire Tales, self-published, 2012
- Cthulhu's Daughter and Other Horror Tales, self-published, 2012
- The Midnight Spell, with Kody Boye, self-published, 2013
- Zombie Tales from Dead Worlds, 2014
- The Mesmerized, Permuted Press, 2014
- The Last Mission of the Living, 2014
- Dead Spots, 2015
