= Klára Jerneková =

Czech actress

Klára Jerneková (14 January 1945 in Brno – 31 July 2003 in Prague), was a Czech actress. From 1966 to 2000, she was a successful member of a national drama group in the National Theatre. The actress died on 31 July 2003 due to alcohol and depression.

== Filmography ==
=== Animated films ===
- Snow White and the Seven Dwarfs (1937) – Snow White
- Cinderella (1950) – Cinderella

=== Films/Television Dramas ===
- Domácí víno (1963) – Alena
- Bubny (1965) – Karma
- Prípad pro zacínajícího kata (1970) – Markéta
- Hrabe Drakula (1971) – Mina Harkerova/Mina Harker
- Tajemství prouteného kosíku (1978)
- Mí Prazané mi rozumeji (1991)
- Hotel Herbich (2000)
