= Dracula – L'amour plus fort que la mort =

Dracula
- L'amour plus fort que la mort
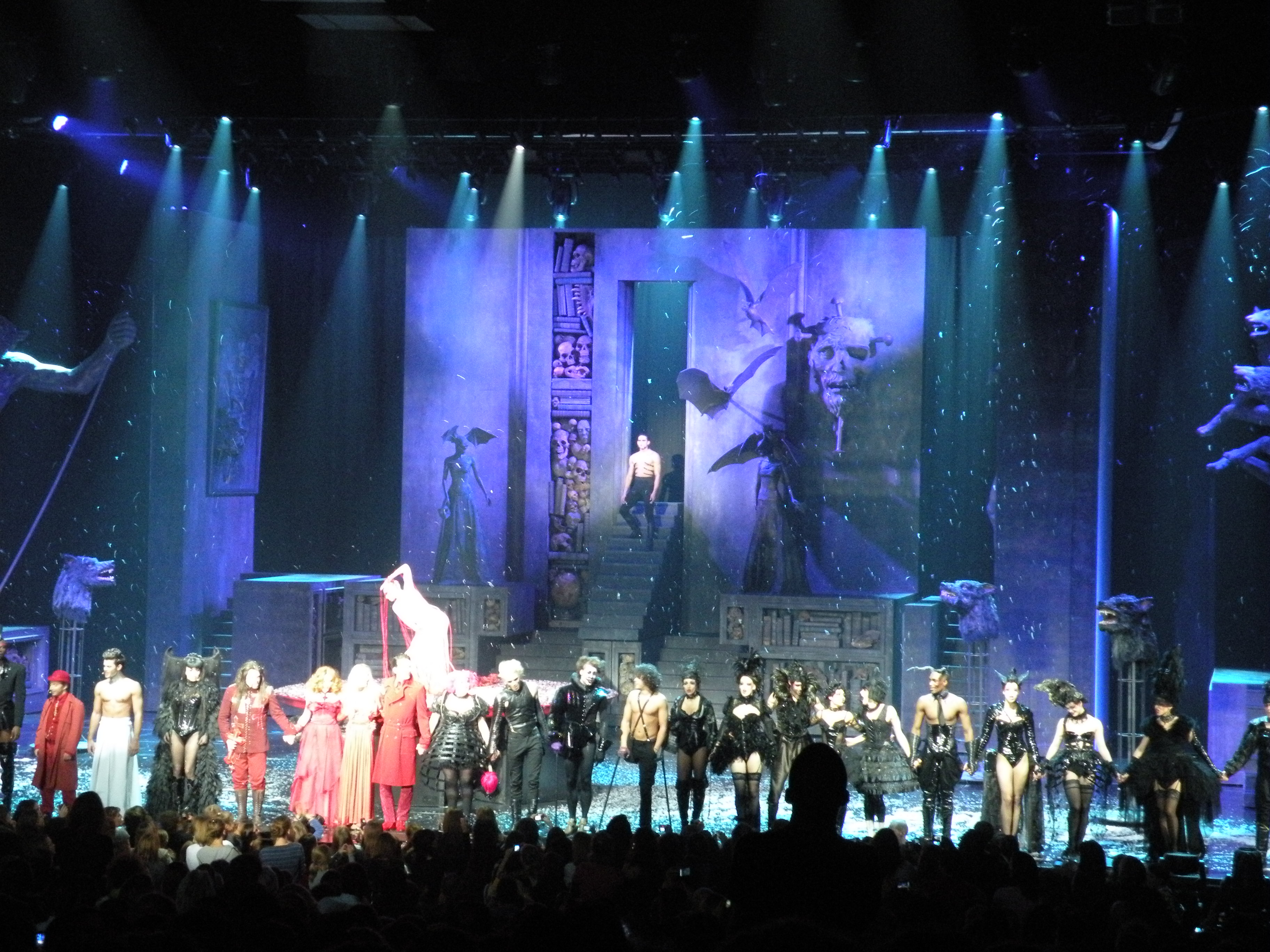
- Music: Volodia and Philippe Uminski
- Basis: Bram Stoker's Dracula
- Productions: Kamel Ouali at Palais des Sports de Paris in 2011

Dracula, l'amour plus fort que la mort ('Dracula: Love stronger than death') is a French musical in two acts by French choreographer Kamel Ouali, his debut production. It was first performed on 30 September 2011 at the Palais des Sports de Paris. The Kamel Ouali work was inspired by Bram Stoker's 1897 novel Dracula and by the 1992 film version by Francis Ford Coppola. A filmed version of the work was also shown on wide screens throughout France between 20 and 22 July 2012.

The album released from the show peaked at number 25 on the French Album Chart.

== Personnel ==
- Production: Thierry Suc
- Staging and choreography: Kamel Ouali
- Assistant staging: Marjorie Ascione
- Assistant choreographers: Patricia Delon, David Drouard
- Air choreographers: Florence Delahaye, Gabriel Dehu
- Assistant (comedy): Phillippe Lelièvre
- Vocal coach: Nathalie Dupuy
- Costumes designer: Dominique Borg
- Scenography and decor creation: Bernard Arnould, Elodie Grimal, Antonio Nigro, Sylvestre Guené
- Lighting: Jacques Rouveyrollis
- Projections: Gilles Papain
- Sound: Stéphane Plisson and Alex Maggi
- Make up: Déborah Moreno and Maite Gutiérrez
- Hairstylist: Any d'Avray
- Musical direction: Volodia and Philippe Uminski
- Casting: Bruno Berbères
- Label: Warner Music France
- Composers: Fabien Cahen, Jennifer Ayache, Pierre-Antoine "Nius" Melki, Volodia, Feed, Pascal Trogoff, Busta Funk, Davide Esposito, Patrice Guirao, Benoit Poher, Adrien Gallo, Brice Davoli
- 3D creation: Philippe Gérard et 3Dlized

Actors

- Golan Yosef - Count Dracula
- Nathalie Fauquette - Mina Murray
- Gregory Deck - Sorcerer
- Lola Ces - Poison
- Ginie Line - Satine
- Julien Loko - Jonathan Harker
- Anaïs Delva - Lucy Westenra
- Aymeric Ribot - Dr Abraham Van Helsing
- Florent Torres - Angel
- Laurent Levy - Dr Seward
- Sébastien Sfedj - dancer, story teller and role of Joker of the palace

Alternative actors

- Sébastien Agius - Sorcerer and Angel (replacement for Gregory Deck et Florent Torres)
- Fanny Fourquez - Lucy, Satine and Poison (replacement for Anaïs Delva, Ginie Line et Lola Ces)
- Julien Lamassonne - Jonathan and Van Helsing (replacement for Julien Loko et Aymeric Ribot)

Dancers

- Brahem Aiache
- Salim Bagayoko
- Jonathan Ber
- Hélène Buannic
- Mélodie Cailleret
- Joseph Di Marco
- Aurélie Giboire (also a double for Nathalie Fauquette as Mina)
- Alias Hilsum
- Louya Kounkou
- Stéphane Lavalle
- Clément Le Disquay
- Estelle Manas Sahoulamide
- Marco Purcaro (also a double for Golan Yosef as Dracula)
- Abkari Saitouli
- Charlotte Siepiora (also a double for Nathalie Fauquette as Mina)
- Roman Bonaton (aerial artist)
- Cécile Magdeleine (aerial artist)
- Yohann Tete (also a double for Golan Yosef as Dracula)
- Other dancers (on contract or training): Melissa Assi, Emmanuel Auvy, Elisabeth Duguêret, Roxane Garrigos, Yoan Grosjean, Yann Herve, Rebecca Journo, Grégoire Malandin, Sandra Pericou, Alicia Rault, Roman Vikouloff
