= Purple Playhouse =

- Composer: Louis Applebaum
- Country of origin: Canada
- Original language: English
- No. of seasons: 1
- No. of episodes: 8

Production
- Executive producer: Paddy Sampson
- Producer: George Jonas

Original release
- Network: CBC Television
- Release: 25 February – 6 May 1973

Purple Playhouse is a Canadian drama television series that aired on CBC Television in 1973.

== Premise ==
American and European melodramas were adapted in this series of Canadian productions.

== Scheduling ==
This hour-long series was broadcast most Sunday evenings from 25 February to 6 May 1973, generally at 9:00 p.m. (Eastern) except the final broadcast was aired at 8:00 p.m. Some dramas were based on characters such as Dracula and Sweeney Todd while others were adapted from such works as "The Bells", Box and Cox, The Corsican Brothers and The Lyons Mail. Actors seen in this series included Kay Hawtrey, Barry Morse and Chris Wiggins.

Purple Playhouse was named by Fletcher Markle as the phrase represents melodrama from Victorian times.
