= Dracula Daily =

Emailed subscription newsletter about Dracula

- Editor: Matt Kirkland
- Frequency: Daily, sporadic from May to November
- Format: Subscription newsletter
- First issue: May 3, 2021
- Language: English

Dracula Daily is a free subscription newsletter that sends Bram Stoker's 1897 novel Dracula to subscribers via email. The epistolary novel takes place within a single calendar year, from May 3 to November 7. Accordingly, Dracula Daily sends the portion of the novel that occurs each day on the corresponding day. Some days have no email, as there is no corresponding content in the novel, though the entirety of the novel is ultimately transmitted. The newsletter first ran in 2021, and has repeated each year since. It began a sixth run in May 2026.

== Creation and format ==
Dracula Daily is a project of web designer Matt Kirkland. He had the idea for Dracula Daily when reading the novel in 2020 and giving periodic updates to his daughter of "what's happening in Dracula". Transmitted via Substack, Dracula Daily first ran in 2021, gaining further popularity when it was rerun in 2022, with 1600 subscribers in 2021 compared to 200,000 as of May 17, 2022. The great increase surprised Kirkland. As of October 2023, the newsletter has more than 240,000 subscribers.

Kirkland does not modify the content of the novel, which is in the public domain, but does rearrange portions to match up with their day of writing in-novel. For example, a ship captain's log covering several days is reproduced in a newspaper article all at once in the novel, but Dracula Daily instead sent each day of the captain's log in "real time". Kirkland also keeps the novel's epilogue in the same year, despite taking place seven years later in the novel.

== Reception ==
Dracula Daily has been likened to a book club, since many subscribers read along in real time and can discuss the most recent updates. The 2022 run has become popular on Tumblr, with users following along and creating memes, such as expressing anxiety over the fate of their "dear friend Jonathan Harker". It has increased interest in Dracula, its adaptations, and other vampire fiction, and inspired other forms of serialized classic literature.

== See also ==
- Serial (literature)
