= Count Orlok =

Nosferatu antagonist

- Nosferatu character
- Max Schreck as Count Orlok
- First appearance: Nosferatu, eine Symphonie des Grauens (1922)
- Created by: F. W. Murnau; Albin Grau; Henrik Galeen
- Based on: Count Dracula by Bram Stoker
- Portrayed by: Max Schreck (1922); Klaus Kinski (1979 & 1988); Christopher Heyerdahl (Are You Afraid of the Dark?); Willem Dafoe (2000); Alexander Ward (SpongeBob SquarePants); Doug Jones (2023); Bill Skarsgård (2024)

In-universe information
- Aliases: Count Dracula; The Bird of Death; Nosferatu
- Species: Vampire
- Gender: Male
- Nationality: Romanian

Count Orlok, (Note: German: Graf Orlok; Romanian: Contele Orlok; Hungarian: Orlok gróf) also known colloquially as Nosferatu, is a fictional character who first appeared in the silent film Nosferatu (1922) directed by F. W. Murnau. Based on Count Dracula from Bram Stoker's Dracula, he is played by German actor Max Schreck, and is depicted as a vampire descended from Belial, who leaves his homeland of Transylvania to spread the plague in the idyllic city of Wisborg in Biedermeier-period Germany.

Count Orlok would reappear in remakes, played by Klaus Kinski, Doug Jones and Bill Skarsgård, as well as in comic book adaptations and sequels. Orlok's distinct appearance, which is closer to that of vampires of Eastern European folklore than to traditional depictions of Dracula, influenced numerous later vampire designs, including those of Salem's Lot, Buffy the Vampire Slayer and the Blade film franchise, typically in order to distance the creatures from their more conventionally humanized or charming counterparts.

== Name ==
As Nosferatu is an unauthorized and unofficial adaptation of Bram Stoker's 1897 novel Dracula, character names were changed in an attempt to avoid accusations of copyright infringement, including changing Count Dracula's name to Count Orlok which, according to historian Matei Cazacu, derives from the Romanian vârcolac, while David Annwn Jones links it phonetically to the Hungarian ordog. Jones also notes how orlok is an archaic form of the Dutch oorlog, meaning "war". Alternative spellings have included "Orlock", "Orlac" and "Orloc".

The character is nevertheless referred to as "Nosferatu" in the film's publicity material and in director F. W. Murnau's annotated copy of the script. The character is referred to as Dracula in some rereleases of the film.

In Werner Herzog's 1979 remake, Nosferatu the Vampyre, the character names revert to those used in the original novel, while the 2023 and 2024 remakes maintain the names used in the original 1922 film. In the 1988 sequel to the 1979 film, Vampire in Venice, the character is referred to as "Nosferatu".

== Creation ==
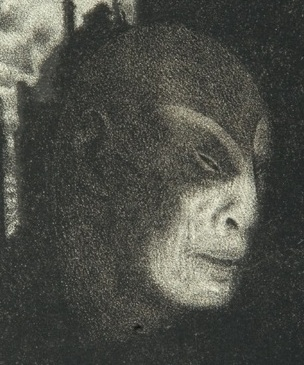
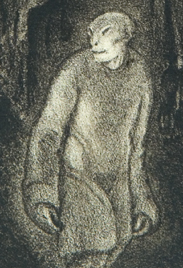
Illustrations from Gustav Meyrink's The Golem, which influenced Orlok's design

The character was largely conceived by Prana Film founder and occultist artist Albin Grau. Grau claimed he was inspired to shoot Nosferatu after meeting a farmer during the Serbian campaign, who stated that his father had been a vampire.

Grau had a strong influence on Orlok's look, which was inspired by Hugo Steiner-Prag's illustrations for Gustav Meyrink's The Golem. He may have also been influenced by the corpses he saw in the trenches of the First World War. Further links to the war have been noticed in Orlok's association with rats, which were a persistent nuisance in the trenches, and the character suddenly appearing enveloped in thick smoke, which has been linked to the poison gas used during the conflict.

The character was played by Max Schreck, whose military experiences during the First World War have been thought to have influenced his performance. According to Grau's diary entries, Schreck, when in full makeup, was "shunned" by the Slovak assistants on set.

== Characterization ==
In Nosferatu, the Count is described in the fictional book Von Vampiren, erschröcklichen Geistern, Zaubereyen und den sieben Todsünden (transl. Of Vampyres, Ghastly Spirits, Witchcraft, and the Seven Deadly Sins) as a hematophagous creature that dwells in dank caves, tombs and coffins filled with soil gathered from graveyards containing the victims of the Black Death. The book elaborates that Orlok originated from the "seed of Belial", an entity described in the Dead Sea Scrolls as one of four Satanic archdemons and associated with pestilence in Psalm 41: 8-10. David Annwn Jones notes that this is in contrast to Count Dracula, upon whom the character was based, as Orlok is never stated to have once been human or of being an undead revenant, being instead a creature of demonic lineage who sleeps in coffins merely for the sake of protection against sunlight and convenience in transporting the rats under his command. The film contains no references to a Dracula-like noble ancestry and does not feature any brides or Roma henchmen, with Orlok's lust for the character of Ellen Hutter being his only human affiliation. Jones further comments that:

Though invisibility and partial invisibility and, presumably, the ability to communicate with and transform into animals are shared, other of Dracula's aspects of magic are jettisoned in favour of Enochian script and spells. ... In all but the active consumption of blood, Orlok ... [is] closer to the devilish entities in Roman Polanski's Rosemary's Baby (1968), William Friedkin's The Exorcist (1973) and Richard Donner's The Omen (1976) than to Stoker's vampire.

As noted by J. Gordon Melton, Orlok resembles folkloric vampires more than Dracula, being thoroughly repulsive, sporting a bald head, a beaklike nose, hollowed-out eyes, pointed ears, and sharp fingernails. His fangs, rather than being elongated canines, are positioned at the front of his mouth like those of a rat. He walks with a slow and labored gait, and his attire consists of a long black coat and tight pants which, according to Anton Kaes, "give the impression of skeletal limbs tightly wrapped in funereal clothes". Orlok also lacks Dracula's suave or charm, acting with unrelenting strangeness, with his initial demeanor toward the character of Thomas Hutter being that of an old Eastern European aristocrat who has outlived his societal usefulness. All of these traits combined preclude the possibility of him ever being mistaken for a human, thus preventing viewers from identifying with him.

He is the first vampire to have been portrayed as being fatally vulnerable to sunlight, with previous vampire portrayals having shown them being uncomfortable with it, but not mortally susceptible. While never seen shapeshifting in the film, he is nevertheless shown to be capable of walking through walls, as per Stoker. His association with the plague, while absent in Dracula, is consistent with vampiric mythology, as vampires were once blamed for several historical epidemics. Unlike Stoker's Dracula, he casts a shadow and reflects in mirrors. He corresponds with Knock through letters filled with Enochian, hermetic and alchemical symbols.

== Fictional character biography ==
Count Orlok is a vampire from Transylvania known as the Totenvogel (transl. "Bird of Death" or "Deathbird") who dwells in a vast castle in a lost corner of the Carpathian Mountains. He and his castle, forgotten by the world for centuries, are swathed in shadows and exhibit a sinister feel due to years of neglect. The local peasants live in terror of phantoms and werewolves haunting the region and never venture out after dark.

During the Biedermeier period in 1838, Orlok forms a pact with the housing agent Knock, promising him wealth in exchange for a house in the (fictional) city of Wisborg, Germany. Orlok receives Knock's employee, Thomas Hutter, and almost reveals his true nature after Hutter accidentally cuts his finger, causing the Count to briefly lose control. Orlok then feeds off Hutter after he collapses from shock. When Hutter regains consciousness, Orlok signs the documents to purchase the house and notices a miniature portrait of Hutter's wife, Ellen, remarking that she has a "lovely neck."

After Hutter discovers Orlok's vampiric nature, the Count attempts to feed off him again, but is repelled when he telepathically senses Ellen's distress. The next morning, Orlok is discovered "sleeping" in a filthy coffin filled with earth. Hutter then witnesses Orlok loading a cart with several coffins filled with soil, one of which he then hides in, and they are driven off to be loaded onto the ship Empusa headed for Wisborg.

During his journey through Europe, he kills everyone onboard the Empusa and spreads the plague throughout the continent. Upon his arrival in Wisborg, Orlok infests the city with rats that sleep in his coffins, and countless people fall victim to the plague, forcing the local authorities to declare a quarantine and provoking hysteria among the citizens. Ellen learns that the Nosferatu can be vanquished only if a woman pure in heart willingly allows him to feed on her long enough to prevent him from seeking shelter from sunrise. Ellen coaxes Orlok to her room and lies in bed whilst he drinks from her neck. The sun rises, and Orlok is burned away in a cloud of smoke.

== Interpretations ==
In his From Caligari to Hitler, Siegfried Kracauer identified Orlok as a "scourge of God" comparable to Attila, noting that it was "highly significant that during this period German imagination, regardless of its starting-point, always gravitated towards such figures — as if under the compulsion of love-hate". Matei Cazacu draws a parallel between Orlok's attempt at subjugating Wisborg with the failed imperial ambitions of Wilhelm II, but notes that "the vampire at least had the consolation of experiencing love". Anton Kaes notes how Orlok's thirst for blood represents a love of eternal values rather than the "erratic sphere of commerce" represented by Hutter, which would have resonated with contemporary audiences living in a period of inflation and multicultural tension. Kaes also draws a link between Orlok and the shell shocked veterans returning from the Eastern Front, with Orlok being interpreted as the personification of Thomas Hutter's trauma, intruding into his personal life and competing for the love of Ellen.

Some authors have compared Orlok's appearance to stereotypical caricatures of Jewish people from the time in which Nosferatu was produced. His features have also been compared to those of a rat or a mouse, the former of which Jews were often equated with. J. Hoberman notes how Orlok's actions in the film evoke "both the blood libel and the accusation of poisoning wells to spread disease that resulted in widespread pogroms and the near-extermination of Jews throughout the Rhineland in the mid-14th century". Others have said that perceived associations between Orlok and antisemitic stereotypes are unlikely to have been conscious decisions, citing director F. W. Murnau's protectiveness of Jewish cast members and status as a homosexual, which would have made him "presumably more sensitive to the persecution of a subgroup inside the larger German society".

== Reception ==
Reception to Orlok, and his perceived "monstrousness" compared to other vampires, has been very positive, with publication Vulture Magazine declaring, "A defining Dracula movie in all but name, Nosferatu is one of the most important and influential films ever made, thanks in part to Schreck’s terrifying Count Orlok. With his teetering build, bat-shaped ears, and curling nails, Orlok remains a potently unsettling villain a hundred years later." Roger Ebert praised Schreck's performance as Orlok, noting that it "avoids most of the theatrical touches that would distract from all the later performances ... The vampire should come across not like a flamboyant actor but like a man suffering from a dread curse." Likewise, Kim Newman praised the monstrous nature of Orlock, stating, "Schreck's vampire is truly nightmarish, scuttling from shadows like something you'd really like to see back under its rock." Conversely, André Gide believed the Orlok character was too overtly monstrous to credibly deceive the other characters.

== Later depictions ==
=== Kinski's portrayals ===
This vampire is someone millions can identify with. He personifies the mingled sadness and desire of people who want to kill themselves because they can't live without physical and spiritual love.

— Klaus Kinski

The character was portrayed by Klaus Kinski in Werner Herzog's 1979 remake Nosferatu the Vampyre. Herzog described this incarnation as "not a monster, but an ambivalent, masterful force of change. When the plague threatens, people throw their property into the streets; they discard their bourgeois trappings. A re‐evaluation of life and its meaning takes place." Kinski described him as "a man without free will. He cannot choose, and he cannot cease to be. He is a kind of incarnation of evil, but he is also a man who is suffering, suffering for love. This makes it so much more dramatic, more double‐edged."

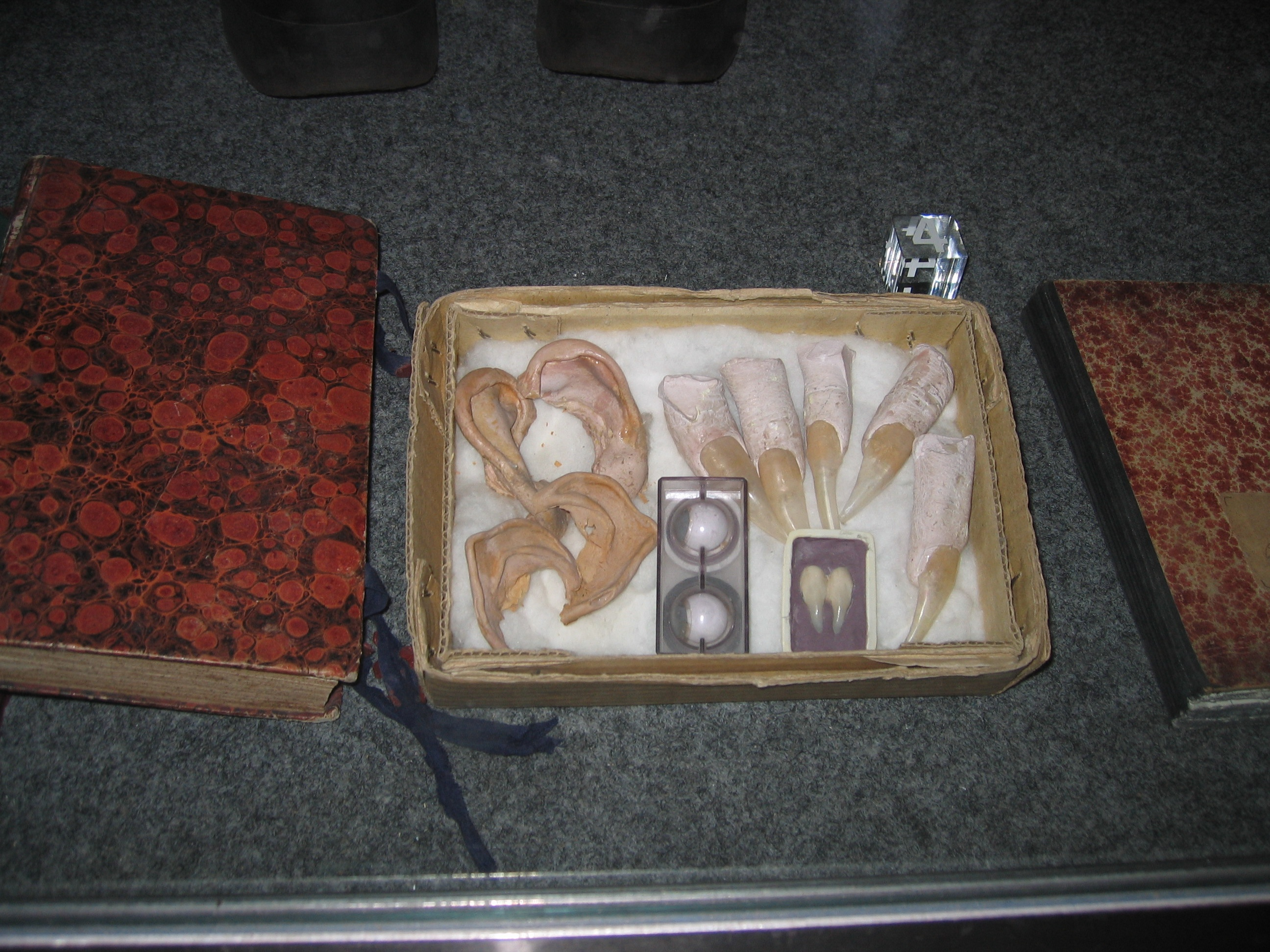
Prosthetics used by Klaus Kinski for Nosferatu the Vampyre at the Filmmuseum Düsseldorf

Kinski's make-up was an imitation of Max Schreck's in the 1922 original and was applied by Japanese artist Reiko Kruk. Although Kinski fought with Herzog and others during the making of other films, he got along with Kruk, and the four-hour makeup sessions proceeded without any outbursts from Kinski himself.

Kinski's portrayal was praised by Roger Ebert, who wrote that there is "nothing pleasant about Herzog's vampire", which was "played totally without ego by Klaus Kinski ... [who] does honor to the seriousness of vampires. ... if they were real, here is how they must look", while Fabio Giovannini describes Kinski's portrayal as "without doubt, the most repugnant vampire in cinematic history". David Annwn Jones notes how Kinski's character plays down the demonic aspects of the original Orlok and approaches Dracula more closely, as he mentions his noble lineage and has the ability to create more vampires from his victims. Furthermore, Kinski's vampire does not reflect in mirrors, unlike the original. Simon Bacon, in comparing Kinski's performance to Schreck's, notes:

Kinski's Dracula not only builds upon the bestial nature of Schreck's vampire – he is visibly ancient and inhuman – but adds a world weariness and melancholy to his persona in keeping with the introspection of the 1970s New German Cinema movement. ... While Schreck's movements are rigid and arch, mirroring the gothic architecture that so often surrounds him, Kinski's posture is rounded as if he were constricting from within and his movements are generally slow and pained.

In the 1988 pseudo-sequel to the 1979 remake, Vampire in Venice, the vampire, played by Kinski once again, is portrayed as a "Byronic hero" seeking death by having sex with a virgin woman. The film includes several innovations in the vampire myth, showing the monster as being able to walk around in daylight, cast a reflection in mirrors and is undeterred by crosses. Kinski initially refused to shave his head and wear fake fangs for the role, though conceded and wore Orlok's traditional rat-like fangs for several scenes. Matthew Edwards stated that "Kinski paints his sadistic vampire with a sneering disgust for those around him", while Roberto Curti stated that Kinski's performance "drowns the film".

=== The Tale of the Midnight Madness ===
Orlok was played by Christopher Heyerdahl in the 26 June 1993 episode of Are You Afraid of the Dark?, "The Tale of the Midnight Madness." In the episode, a troubled movie theatre finds renewed success when it begins showing a midnight run of a film titled Nosferatu: The Demon Vampire, which is similar to the 1922 film. Things are going well until Orlok steps through the screen into the real world and begins terrorizing the theatre.

SlashFilm describes Heyerdahl's portrayal as "pretty disturbing" and says that he is "eminently icky as the fabled vampire."

=== 2023 remake ===
Orlok was played by Doug Jones in the 2023 remake. In an interview with Dread Central, he stated: "I don't think Orlok realizes how much he's faded. In his mind, he's still the dashing count he once was, and that dichotomy fascinated me". His makeup was restricted to his face and hands, and took four hours to apply. Regarding his portrayal, Jones said: "The farther you get from human, the harder it is to play, ... Orlok's humanity is still there, buried under layers of torment and hunger. That's where the real performance comes from—his desires, regrets, and fears". Director David Lee Fisher explained that this interpretation of Orlok was deliberately distanced from Kinski's portrayal and approached Shreck's original performance more closely, being "an elemental force of nature ... definitely destructive, but not necessarily evil".

Jones' performance received mixed responses, with Tarryn Gaherty of Collider praising him as one of the best aspects of the film, "masterfully combin[ing] physical acting with prosthetics and practical effects", while Jennie Kermode of Eye For Film compared him unfavourably to prior Orlok performers, stating "he cannot capture the same air of uncanny charisma [as Max Schreck], which the film really depends on; neither can he compel the viewer's attention as Klaus Kinski did in his attempts".

=== 2024 remake ===
Bill Skarsgård played Orlok in Robert Eggers' 2024 remake. This incarnation, a former Solomonar who had made a pact with Satan in a bid for immortality, is portrayed as having developed an exploitative psychic bond with Ellen Hutter when she was a child, only to torment her in adulthood once she marries Thomas.

Skarsgård was originally set to play Thomas Hutter, but Eggers decided to cast him as Orlok after seeing his performance as Pennywise in It Chapter Two. Eggers' intention was to distance his Orlok from conventional cinematic vampires and to draw inspiration from folklore, resulting in a "hulking brute with a booming voice — less vampire, more undead Transylvanian nobleman", while still retaining details recalling Schreck's portrayal, such as fingernails, posture and the shape of the head. The makeup was applied by David White, who modeled the skin tone on that of a 17th-18th century wax sculpture. Orlok's design in this film is partially inspired by Vlad Dracula, whom the original Dracula was named after, with Eggers stating that "there's never been a version of Dracula or Nosferatu dressed like a Transylvanian nobleman with authentic Hungarian attire from the 16th century." Costume designer Linda Muir sought inspiration from the Transylvanian military from around 1560 to the mid-1600s, incorporating pieces of clothing such as dolman, mente fur coat, or kolpak into Orlok's costume. Skarsgård, having refused to have his voice digitally modulated, was trained to lower his voice by Icelandic opera singer Ásgerður Júníusdóttir, incorporating Mongolian throat singing into his lines. Inspired by Orlok being an ancient Romanian count, Eggers decided to have him speak a reconstructed form of the Dacian language in the film. In creating the interior of Orlok's castle, production designer Craig Lathrop sought to give it a haunted look by keeping furniture to a minimum. Corvin Castle was selected for exterior shots for being "in terrible shape", thus coinciding with the "diseased" aesthetic Lathrop wanted. For Orlok's sarcophagus, he incorporated Solomonic sigils and Dacian designs. For his role as Orlok, Skårsgard wore a prosthetic penis, which was kept and framed by his co-star Nicholas Hoult.

Skarsgård's performance has been positively received by critics. Peter Bradshaw described Skarsgård's portrayal as "opaque and forbiddingly gruesome without being necessarily as scary as could be expected", while Matt Zoller Seitz described it as Skarsgård's "best work yet" which is best thought not "as a performance, but a repugnant yet strangely mesmerizing obscenity, excavated from a tomb and placed in front of the camera". Wesley Morris described it as "the grossest-looking, ooziest, most cooked, most rotted, most mustached, least-living Dracula I can recall. ... This 'Nosferatu' dares you to feel seduced and sick over the seduction".

== Legacy ==
Kurt Barlow in the 1979 miniseries Salem's Lot, which was heavily influenced by Count Orlok's design.

Orlok's fascination with Hutter's picture of his wife and his emergence from his coffin onboard the Empusa in a "jack-in-the-box" fashion have been imitated in several subsequent Dracula adaptations.

Orlok's design influenced that of Kurt Barlow in the 1979 miniseries Salem's Lot. Orlok-like vampires have also appeared alongside their more conventional counterparts in Buffy the Vampire Slayer and the Blade film franchise, where they are, according to Simon Bacon, "utilised in order to convey a formidable antagonist in contrast to the increasingly humanised vampires that surround both Buffy and Blade; a return to the monstrosity that underpins the mythology". Orlok's design was also the inspiration behind some non-vampiric creatures, including the Remans from Star Trek: Nemesis and the Indoraptor from Jurassic World: Fallen Kingdom.

Orlok appeared in the four-part Nosferatu: Plague of Terror comic book series by Mark Ellis, which fleshes out his backstory and places him in the modern era. In this series, he is portrayed as a Carpathian nobleman from the 11th century who was killed after becoming a vampire and sealed in his castle, only to be unwittingly resurrected by a crusader whom he vampirises. Orlok then causes havoc throughout history, only to be stopped in contemporary Brooklyn.

Orlok, referred to as "Nosferatu", was included in the 2002 SpongeBob SquarePants episode "Graveyard Shift". Writer and storyboard director Jay Lender had initially wanted to create an original character called "Floorboard Harry", but replaced him with Orlok as a tribute to the magazine series Famous Monsters of Filmland, which he had enjoyed as a child and where he had first seen images of Orlok. According to Polygon writer James Grebey, "it's entirely possible that more people have seen Count Orlok in that episode of SpongeBob than have seen Nosferatu". The character would appear in some subsequent episodes of SpongeBob SquarePants, and a child version of the character named "Kidferatu" features in Kamp Koral: SpongeBob's Under Years with his vocal effects provided by Dee Bradley Baker. Robert Eggers, the director of the 2024 Nosferatu remake, credited SpongeBob SquarePants with introducing Count Orlok to younger audiences.

== See also ==
- Count Dracula
- Nosferatu (word)
- Kurt Barlow
- The Master (Buffy the Vampire Slayer)
