= Bunica Gherghina =

Romanian TikToker

- Born: Bereghianu Gherghina; Teleorman County

TikTok information
- Page: bunica.gherghina

YouTube information
- Channel: Bunica Gherghina

Bereghianu Gherghina, known online by the nickname Bunica Gherghina (lit. 'Granny Gherghina') is a Romanian TikToker from Teleorman known for videos of her cooking Romanian cuisine.

Gherghina was convinced to use TikTok by her granddaughter Catalina. She was initially skeptical and did not want to use TikTok, but said she "fell in love" with the platform after seeing the response to her first video. Her TikTok account is managed by her granddaughter, and she had over 700,000 followers on the platform in 2024. She has stated that she continues to cook traditional recipes as a way to carry on traditions passed on from her grandparents. Kanal D has described Gherghina as "one of the most famous old women in our country".

Gherghina has made various appearances on Romanian television, including the talk show of Cătălin Măruță and season 11 of the Romanian cooking show Chefi la cuțite. She also appeared in a minor role in the 2024 American film Nosferatu. Director Robert Eggers stated that he discovered her through her TikTok videos, and that her prior experience on talk television gave her skill on set. Although she is from southern Romania, she used a Transylvanian accent for her character in the film.
