= Nosferatu =

1922 silent film by F. W. Murnau

Nosferatu: A Symphony of Horror
- German magazine ad
- Directed by: F. W. Murnau
- Screenplay by: Henrik Galeen
- Based on: Dracula by Bram Stoker
- Produced by: Enrico Dieckmann; Albin Grau
- Starring: Max Schreck; Gustav von Wangenheim; Greta Schröder; Alexander Granach
- Cinematography: Fritz Arno Wagner; Günther Krampf (uncredited)
- Music by: Hans Erdmann (1922 premiere)
- Production company: Prana Film
- Distributed by: Film Arts Guild
- Release date: 4 March 1922 (Germany)
- Running time: 63–94 minutes, depending on version and transfer speed
- Country: Weimar Republic
- Languages: Silent film; German intertitles

Nosferatu: A Symphony of Horror (German: Nosferatu – Eine Symphonie des Grauens) is a 1922 silent vampire film directed by F. W. Murnau from a screenplay by Henrik Galeen. It stars Max Schreck as Count Orlok, a vampire who preys on the wife (Greta Schröder) of his estate agent (Gustav von Wangenheim) and brings a plague to their town.

Nosferatu was produced by Prana Film and is an unofficial and unauthorized adaptation of Bram Stoker's 1897 novel Dracula. Various names and other details were changed from the novel, including Count Dracula being renamed Count Orlok. Although those changes are often represented as a defense against copyright infringement accusations, the original German intertitles acknowledged Dracula as the source. Film historian David Kalat states in his commentary track that since the film was "a low-budget film made by Germans for German audiences... setting it in Germany with German-named characters makes the story more tangible and immediate for German-speaking viewers".

Even with several details altered, Stoker's widow Florence sued over the adaptation's copyright violation, and a court ruling ordered all copies of the film to be destroyed. However, several prints of Nosferatu survived, and the German Expressionist film came to be regarded as an influential masterpiece of cinema and the horror genre. Critic and historian Kim Newman declared it as a film that set the template for the genre of horror film. The film entered the public domain worldwide in 2019.

== Plot ==
Nosferatu (1922)

In 1838, in the fictional German town of Wisborg, Thomas Hutter is sent to Transylvania by his employer, the eccentric estate agent Herr Knock, to visit a new client, Count Orlok, who is planning to buy a derelict house across from Hutter's own residence. As Hutter studies the route on a map, Knock secretly studies a mysterious correspondence in cabalistic symbols. While embarking on his journey, Hutter stops at an inn in which the locals are terrified by the mere mention of Orlok's name. In his room, he finds a book about vampires, which he initially scoffs at but puts in his baggage.

After his carriage refuses to take him further than the entrance to the mountain pass, Hutter travels on foot until after sunset, when he is met on the road by a coach and rides to Orlok's castle in the Carpathian Mountains, where he is welcomed by Orlok himself. While Hutter is eating supper, he accidentally cuts his thumb; Orlok tries to suck the blood out, but his repulsed guest pulls his hand away. Hutter wakes up the next morning to find fresh punctures on his neck, which he attributes to mosquitoes. That night, Orlok signs the documents to purchase the house and notices on the table a miniature portrait of Hutter's wife, Ellen, an image that the young man carries with him in a small circular frame. Admiring the portrait, the count remarks that she has a "lovely neck".

Reading the book that he took from the inn, Hutter begins to suspect that Orlok is indeed a vampire. With no way to bar the door to his bedroom, Hutter desperately tries to hide as midnight approaches. Suddenly, the door begins to slowly open by itself and, as Orlok enters, a terrified Hutter hides under the bedcovers and falls unconscious. Meanwhile, back in Wisborg, Ellen arises from her own bed and sleepwalks to the railing of her bedroom's balcony. She starts walking on top of the railing, which gets the attention of Thomas's friend Harding in the adjacent room. When the doctor arrives, Ellen envisions Orlok in his castle threatening her unconscious husband and shouts Hutter's name, which somehow Orlok is able to hear, causing him to withdraw.

On the next day, Hutter explores the castle. In a vault, he finds the coffin in which Orlok is resting dormant in the crypt and flees back to his room. Hours later, as Hutter watches, Orlok piles up coffins on a coach and climbs into the last one before the coach departs. Hutter manages to escape from the castle, injuring himself in the process, and after a period of recovery, he rushes home. Orlok's coffins are taken aboard a schooner, which the sailors open only to discover rats. All of the crewmen later die, and Orlok takes control of the vessel. Not long after Hutter returns home, the ship arrives in Wisborg; Orlok leaves unobserved, carrying one of his coffins, and moves into the house that he had purchased.

Many deaths in the town follow Orlok's arrival, which the local doctors attribute to an unspecified plague caused by the rats from the ship. Knock, who has gone completely insane, is confined to a mental asylum, but escapes after strangling one of the wardens. Against Hutter's wishes, Ellen reads the book that he found on his journey; it claims that a vampire can be destroyed if a pure-hearted woman distracts the vampire from the approaching dawn with her beauty and by offering him her blood of her own free will; Ellen decides to sacrifice herself to stop Orlok. Knock, whom the villagers blame for the plague, is eventually recaptured and returned to the asylum. Ellen opens her window to invite Orlok in and pretends to fall ill so that she can send Hutter to fetch Professor Bulwer, a physician. After he leaves, Orlok enters and drinks her blood, but the sun rises and its rays cause Orlok to vanish in a puff of smoke. Knock, in his asylum cell, senses this and is shattered. Ellen lives just long enough to be embraced by her grief-stricken husband.

The film's final image is that of Orlok's castle, destroyed.

== Cast ==
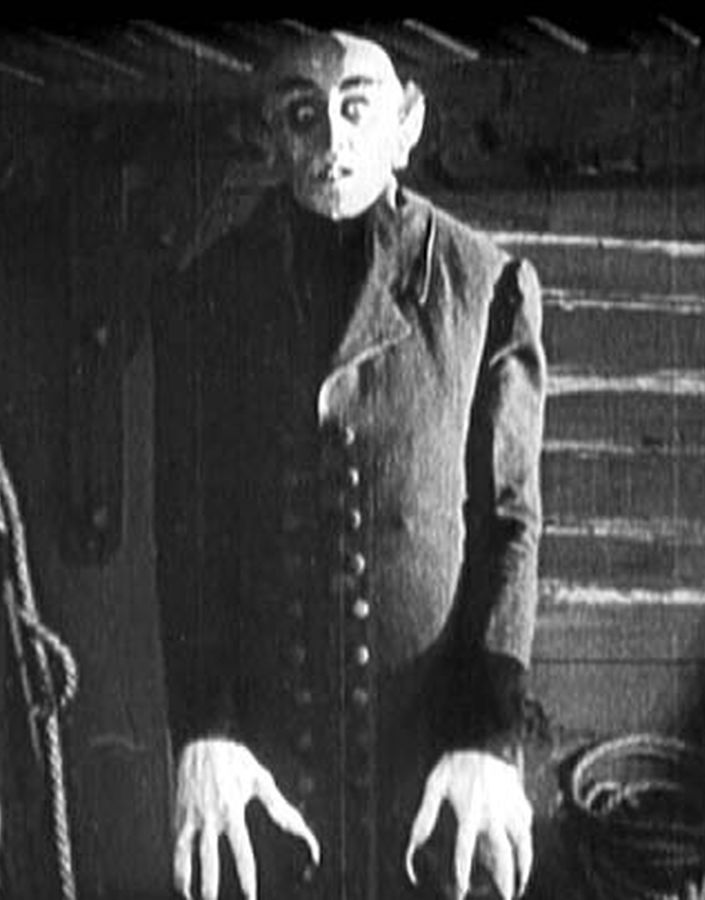
Max Schreck as Count Orlok in Nosferatu (1922)

- Max Schreck as Count Orlok, a Transylvanian noble and vampire. In the public domain version, he is referred to as Count Dracula.
- Gustav von Wangenheim as Thomas Hutter, a young estate agent. In the public domain version, he is referred to as Jonathon Harker.
- Greta Schröder as Ellen, Hutter's wife. In the public domain version, she is referred to as Nina.
- Georg H. Schnell as Harding, a wealthy shipowner and Hutter's friend. In the public domain version, he is referred to as Westenra.
- Ruth Landshoff as Ruth, Harding's sister. In the public domain version, she is referred to as Lucy and said to be his wife.
- Gustav Botz as Professor Sievers, Wisborg's doctor. In the public domain version, he is referred to as the town doctor.
- Alexander Granach as Knock, an estate broker and Hutter's employer. In the public domain version, he is referred to as Renfield.
- John Gottowt as Professor Bulwer, a physician. In the public domain version, he is referred to as Dr. Van Helsing.
- Max Nemetz as the Empusa captain. In the public domain version, he is referred to as the captain of the Demeter.
- Wolfgang Heinz as the Empusa first mate
- Albert Venohr as the Empusa sailor

Making uncredited appearances are Karl Etlinger as one of Bulwer's students, Hardy von Francois as a doctor at a mental hospital, Guido Herzfeld as an innkeeper, and Fanny Schreck as a hospital nurse.

== Themes ==
=== The Other ===
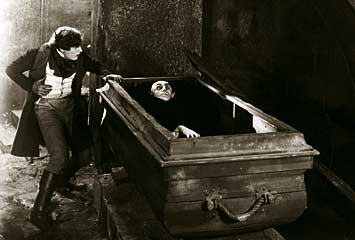
Hutter, discovering Orlok's true nature

Nosferatu has been noted for its themes regarding fear of the Other, as well as for possible antisemitic undertones, both of which may have been partially derived from the Bram Stoker novel Dracula, upon which the film was based. The physical appearance of Count Orlok, with his hooked nose, long claw-like fingernails, and large bald head, has been compared to stereotypical caricatures of Jewish people from the time in which Nosferatu was produced. His features have also been compared to those of a rat or a mouse, the former of which Jews were often equated with. Orlok's interest in acquiring property in the German town of Wisborg, a shift in locale from the Stoker novel's London, has also been analyzed as preying on the fears and anxieties of the German public at the time. Professor Tony Magistrale wrote that the film's depiction of an "invasion of the German homeland by an outside force [...] poses disquieting parallels to the anti-Semitic atmosphere festering in Northern Europe in 1922".

When the foreign Orlok arrives in Wisborg by ship, he brings with him a swarm of rats which, in a deviation from the source novel, spread the plague throughout the town. This plot element further associates Orlok with rodents and the idea of the "Jew as disease-causing agent". It is also notable that Orlok's accomplice in conspiracy, Knock, is a Jewish realtor, who acts as the vampire's fifth column in the Biedermeier town of Wisborg.

There were other views – writer Kevin Jackson has noted that director F. W. Murnau "was friendly with and protective of a number of Jewish men and women" throughout his life, including Jewish actor Alexander Granach, who plays Knock in Nosferatu. Additionally, Magistrale wrote that Murnau, being a homosexual, would have been "presumably more sensitive to the persecution of a subgroup inside the larger German society". As such, it has been said that perceived associations between Orlok and antisemitic stereotypes are unlikely to have been conscious decisions on the part of Murnau.

=== Occultism ===
A contract between Orlok and Knock

Murnau and the film's producer Albin Grau gave Orlok a demonic lineage and an occult origin: Orlok is the creation of Belial, one of the Satanic archdemons. Belial in Psalm 41:8–10 is also associated with pestilence, with Orlok in film being a manifestation of contagion, rats pouring out of his coffins onto the streets of Wisborg, spreading Black Death. Orlok's link to Belial is also significant because Belial is "one of the demons traditionally summoned by Goetic magicians" – making Orlok someone who practiced dark sorcery before becoming a vampire.

Orlok and his servant Knock are communicating in occult language – the documents between Orlok and Knock are written in Enochian, a constructed language said to be that of the angels, which was recorded in the private journals of English occultist John Dee and his colleague English alchemist Edward Kelley in late 16th-century Elizabethan England.

The character of Professor Bulwer in the film is named in reference to English occult novelist Edward Bulwer-Lytton. The idea of astral entities, arising from the dark thoughts of human beings, responsible for epidemics that call for blood sacrifices in order to prevent them, is also closely linked to that of the alchemist Paracelsus, whose figure is partly embodied in the film in the character of Professor Bulwer (who is mentioned in the film to be Paracelsian himself). This is made concrete in the film in the plague epidemic that spreads through the town of Wisborg, which cannot be remedied by scientific methods, but by the blood sacrifice of a woman, thus destroying forever the dark being responsible for this catastrophic situation.

=== World War I ===
Grau served in the German army during World War I on the Serbian front. He claimed he was inspired to shoot a vampire film by a war experience: in his apocryphal tale, during the winter of 1916, a Serbian farmer told him that his father was a vampire and one of the undead. F. W. Murnau also saw considerable action in World War I – not only as a company commander in the trenches of the Eastern Front, but also later in the air after he transferred to the German air service. He survived at least eight crashes. Max Schreck who portrayed Count Orlok also served in the trenches with the German army. Little is known of his war-time experience, but there are some signs he may have dealt with some form of post-traumatic stress disorder. Colleagues commented that he preferred to keep to himself. He was known to take long walks in the forest alone, oftentimes disappearing for hours at a time. He once stated that he lived in "a remote and incorporeal world". Thus it is considered that the turmoil of 1920s Germany and the war-time experiences of those who produced the film left their marks on the production of the film.

As Lotte Eisner, a dedicated occultist, wrote: "Mysticism and magic, the dark forces to which Germans have always been more than willing to commit themselves, had flourished in the face of death on the battlefields" – these forces were intrinsic to the shaping of cinema's first vampires. Albin Grau himself also linked the war and vampires: "this monstrous event that is unleashed across the earth like a cosmic vampire to drink the blood of millions and millions of men". Belial as well is the link between war and contagion, as Orlok is linked directly to the Black Death and many critics have linked Nosferatu's disease-bearing rodents to the transmissible sickness associated with trench warfare in which rats flourished. As noted by Ernest Jones in his psychoanalytic study of nightmares, vampire legends proliferate in periods of mass contagion.

== Production ==
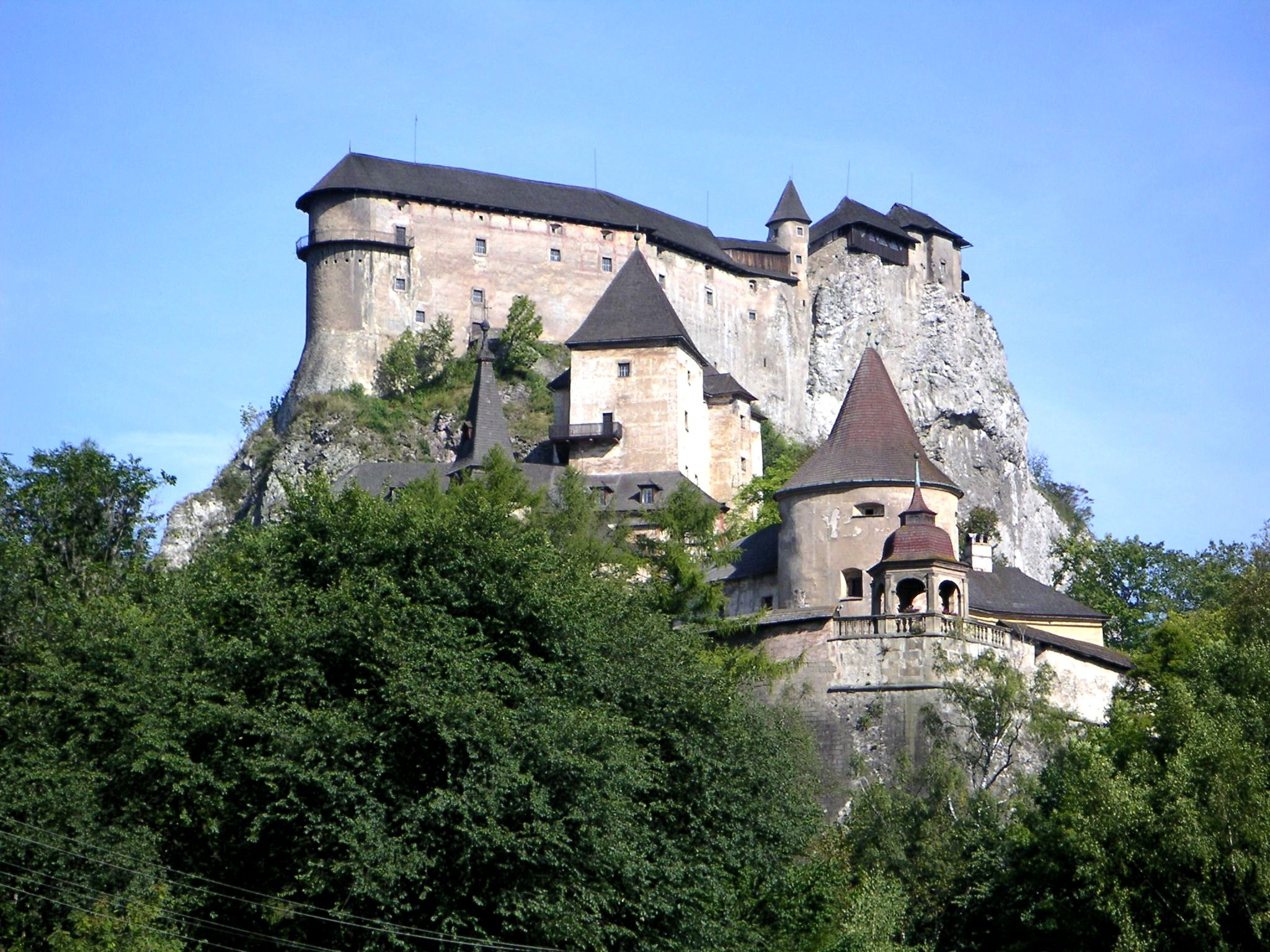
Orava Castle in Slovakia served as Orlok's Transylvanian castle

The studio behind Nosferatu, Prana Film, was a short-lived silent-era German film studio founded in 1921 by Enrico Dieckmann and occultist artist Albin Grau, named after a Theosophical journal which was itself named for the Hindu concept of prana (life force). Although the studio's intent was to produce occult- and supernatural-themed films, Nosferatu was its only production, as it declared bankruptcy shortly after the film's release.

As a lifelong student of the occult, Grau was able to imbue Nosferatu with hermetic and mystical undertones. One example in particular was the cryptic contract that Count Orlok and Knock exchanged, which was filled in Enochian, hermetic and alchemical symbols. Grau was also a strong influence on Orlok's verminous and emaciated look and he also designed the film's sets, costumes, make-up and the letter with the Enochian symbols. He also was responsible for the film's advertising campaign, creating movie posters and advertisements. Grau's visual style was also deeply influenced by work of the artist Hugo Steiner-Prag, who had illustrated other texts with esoteric subjects such as Gustav Meyrink's Golem and E. T. A. Hoffmann's Die Elixiere des Teufels (1907).

Diekmann and Grau gave Henrik Galeen, a disciple of Hanns Heinz Ewers, the task to write a screenplay inspired by the Dracula novel, although Prana Film had not obtained the film rights. Galeen was an experienced specialist in dark romanticism; he had already worked on The Student of Prague (1913), and the screenplay for The Golem: How He Came into the World (1920). Galeen set the story in the fictional north German harbour town of Wisborg. He changed the characters' names and added the idea of the vampire bringing the plague to Wisborg via rats on the ship. Galeen's Expressionist style screenplay was poetically rhythmic without being so dismembered as other books influenced by literary Expressionism, such as those by Carl Mayer. Lotte Eisner described Galeen's screenplay as "voll Poesie, voll Rhythmus" ("full of poetry, full of rhythm").

Actor Conrad Veidt was offered the role of Count Orlok, having previously worked with Murnau, but had to decline for scheduling reasons. In the search for an alternative the choice finally fell on the then-still-unknown actor Max Schreck.

Filming began in July 1921, with exterior shots in Wismar. A take from Marienkirche's tower over Wismar marketplace with the Wasserkunst Wismar served as the establishing shot for the Wisborg scene. Other locations were the Wassertor, the Heiligen-Geist-Kirche yard and the harbour. In Lübeck, the abandoned Salzspeicher served as Nosferatu's new Wisborg manor, the churchyard of the Aegidienkirche served as Hutter's, and down the Depenau a procession of coffin bearers bore coffins of supposed plague victims. Many scenes of Lübeck appear in the hunt for Knock, who ordered Hutter in the Yard of Füchting to meet Count Orlok. Further exterior shots followed in Lauenburg, Rostock and on Sylt. The exteriors of the film set in Transylvania were actually shot on location in northern Slovakia, including the High Tatras, Vrátna dolina, Orava Castle, the Váh River, and Starý Castle. The team filmed interior shots at the JOFA studio in Berlin's Johannisthal locality and further exteriors in the Tegel Forest.

For budgetary reasons, cameraman Fritz Arno Wagner only had one camera available, and therefore there was only one original negative. The director followed Galeen's screenplay carefully, following handwritten instructions on camera positioning, lighting, and related matters. Nevertheless, Murnau completely rewrote 12 pages of the script, as Galeen's text was missing from the director's working script. This concerned the last scene of the film, in which Ellen sacrifices herself and the vampire dies in the first rays of the sun. Murnau prepared carefully; there were sketches that were to correspond exactly to each filmed scene and he used a metronome to control the pace of the acting.

The films traveled to English speaking countries and film production companies who received the original German or translations of translations would have to splice in their own English intertitles. Decades later, there were multiple restoration projects to save the degrading footage. The accumulating intertitle language difficulties are summarized by Brent Reid of silent film website Brenton Film:

The first decent quality, widely distributed copy of the MoMA (New York Museum of Modern Art) print came courtesy of German distributors Atlas Film in 1965. They legitimately acquired their own print directly from MoMA and as well as retaining its English intertitles, translated them yet again, back into both German and French. In case you've lost track, that means at minimum, they'd now gone from original German–Czech–German–French–English to German and French, with each step being a translation of the one before. Incroyable.

The MoMA 1981 restoration used a good condition B&W French print. The French intertitles were the source of the diary author's name Johann Carvallius or Cavallius and also the changing of character names from the original German film to the Bram Stoker Dracula book character names.

== Music ==
The original score was composed by Hans Erdmann and performed by an orchestra at the film's Berlin premiere. However, most of the score has been lost, and what remains is only a partial adapted suite. Thus, throughout the history of Nosferatu screenings, many composers and musicians have written or improvised their own soundtrack to accompany the film. For example, James Bernard, composer of the soundtracks of many Hammer horror films in the late 1950s and 1960s, wrote a score for a reissue. Bernard's score was released in 1997 by Silva Screen Records. A version of Erdmann's original score reconstructed by musicologists and composers Gillian Anderson and James Kessler was released in 1995 by BMG Classics, with multiple missing sequences composed anew, in an attempt to match Erdmann's style. An earlier reconstruction by German composer Berndt Heller has many additions of unrelated classical works. In 1998, Arrow Films released a version on VHS of the film scored by songs from doom metal band Type O Negative, which also featured an introduction with actor David Carradine. In 2022, The New York Times wrote about Dutch composer Jozef van Wissem's new score and record release for Nosferatu. Beginning with a solo played on the lute, his performance incorporates electric guitar and distorted recordings of extinct birds, graduating from subtlety to gothic horror. "My soundtrack goes from silence to noise over the course of 90 minutes," he said, culminating in "dense, slow death metal." A new score for full orchestra and piano was commissioned by the Louisville Orchestra from its former composer-in-residence Sebastian Chang. It premiered, playing live with the film, in October 2023.

A modern, alternative score, Nosferatu Suite, was composed for string quartet by Rob Wright to mark the film's centenary. The suite has been performed at live-to-screen event screenings in the UK and Europe. It made its U.S. premiere in October 2026 performed by members of the NEPA Philharmonic.

== Release ==
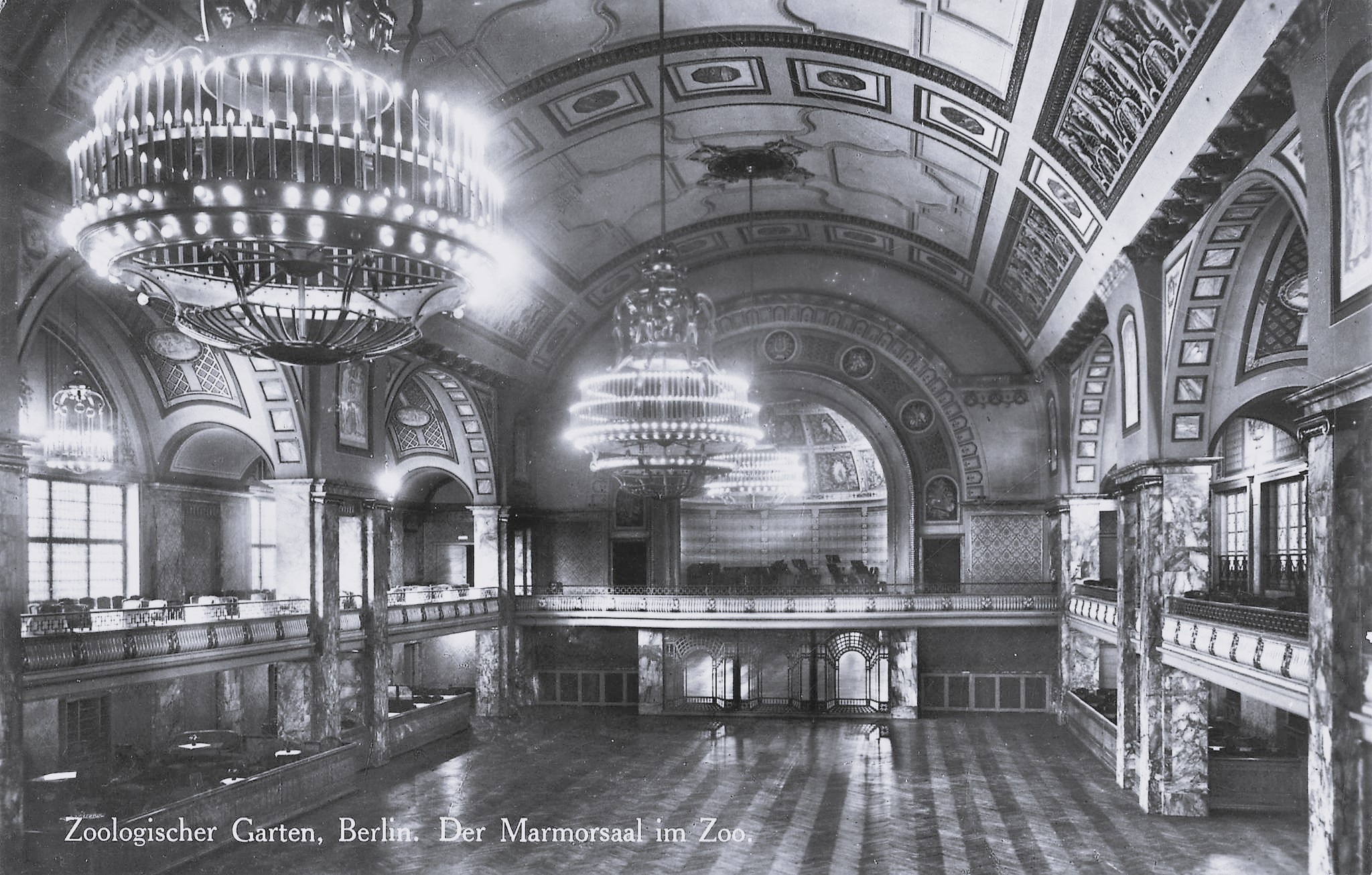
Nosferatu premiered at the Marmorsaal in the Berlin Zoological Garden. (1900 postcard)

Shortly before the premiere, an advertisement campaign was placed in issue #21 of the magazine Bühne und Film, with a summary, scene and work photographs, production reports, and essays, including a treatment on vampirism by Albin Grau. Nosferatu opened in the Netherlands on 16 February 1922 at the Hague Flora and Olympia cinemas. Nosferatu premiered in Germany on 4 March 1922 in the Marmorsaal of the Berlin Zoological Garden. This was planned as a large society evening entitled Das Fest des Nosferatu (Festival of Nosferatu), and guests were asked to arrive dressed in Biedermeier costume. The German cinema premiere itself took place on 15 March 1922 at Berlin's Primus-Palast.

The 1930s sound version Die zwölfte Stunde – Eine Nacht des Grauens (The Twelfth Hour: A Night of Horror), which is less commonly known, was a completely unauthorized and re-edited version of the film. It was released in Vienna, Austria on 16 May 1930 with sound-on-disc accompaniment and a recomposition of Hans Erdmann's original score by Georg Fiebiger, a German production manager and composer of film music. It had an alternative ending lighter than the original and the characters were renamed again; Count Orlok's name was changed to Prince Wolkoff, Knock became Karsten, Hutter and Ellen became Kundberg and Margitta, and Annie was changed to Maria. This version, of which Murnau was unaware, contained many scenes filmed by Murnau but not previously released. It also contained additional footage not filmed by Murnau but by a cameraman, Günther Krampf, under the direction of Waldemar Roger (also known as Waldemar Ronger). The name of director F. W. Murnau is no longer mentioned in the credits. This version, lasting approximately 80 minutes, was presented on 5 June 1981 at the Cinémathèque Française.

== Reception ==
An iconic shot of the shadow of Count Orlok ascending a staircase

Nosferatu brought Murnau into the public eye, especially when his film Der brennende Acker (The Burning Soil) was released a few days later. The press reported extensively on Nosferatu and its premiere, with the movie receiving positive reviews. With these laudatory votes, however, there was also occasional criticism, with the Filmkurier of 6 March 1922 saying that the vampire appeared too corporeal and brightly lit to appear genuinely scary. Hans Wollenberg described the film in photo-Stage No. 11 of 11 March 1922 as a "sensation" and praised Murnau's nature shots as "mood-creating elements." In the Vossische Zeitung of 7 March 1922, Nosferatu was praised for its visual style.

Nosferatu was also the first film to show a vampire dying from exposure to sunlight. Previous vampire novels such as Dracula had shown them being uncomfortable with sunlight, but not mortally susceptible.

The film has continued to receive overwhelmingly positive reviews. On review aggregator website Rotten Tomatoes, the film holds an approval rating of 97% based on 72 reviews, with an average rating of 9.05/10. The website's critical consensus reads, "One of the silent era's most influential masterpieces, Nosferatu's eerie, gothic feel – and a chilling performance from Max Schreck as the vampire – set the template for the horror films that followed." In a list of the 100 most important German films, compiled in 1994 by the Association of German Cinémathèques, Nosferatu was placed at #4. In 1995, the Vatican included Nosferatu on a list of 45 important films that people should watch. It was ranked twenty-first in Empire magazine's "The 100 Best Films of World Cinema" in 2010.

In 1997, critic Roger Ebert added Nosferatu to his list of The Great Movies, writing:

Here is the story of Dracula before it was buried alive in clichés, jokes, TV skits, cartoons and more than 30 other films. The film is in awe of its material. It seems to really believe in vampires. ...Is Murnau's Nosferatu scary in the modern sense? Not for me. I admire it more for its artistry and ideas, its atmosphere and images, than for its ability to manipulate my emotions like a skillful modern horror film. It knows none of the later tricks of the trade, like sudden threats that pop in from the side of the screen. But Nosferatu remains effective: It doesn't scare us, but it haunts us.

== Home media and copyright status ==
A scoreless 1947 public domain version of the film with English intertitles, using the original character names from Bram Stoker's novel (The vampire is named Count Dracula as well as Nosferatu in this version.)

Nosferatu entered the public domain worldwide in 2019. Despite this, the film had already been subject to widespread circulation via a sped-up, unrestored black and white bootleg copy. Beginning in 1981, the film has had various different official restorations, several of which have been issued on home video in the U.S., Europe and Australia. These versions, which are all tinted, speed-corrected and have specially recorded scores, are separately copyrighted with respect to new copyrightable elements. The most recent restoration, completed in 2005/2006, has been released on DVD and Blu-ray throughout the world, and features a reconstruction of Hans Erdmann's original score by Berndt Heller.

== Remakes ==
In 1977, Spanish amateur filmmaker José Ernesto Díaz Noriega added humorous and iconoclastic dialogues to the film. His adaptation or détournement, titled Manuscrito encontrato en Zarazwela or Nos fera tu la pugnete, was based on a Super 8 mm print of the English version. "Observing the curious coincidence of the fiction that is related in the film with history", Díaz Noriega adapted Nosferatu's plot to the years of the Spanish transition to democracy: Prime Minister Arias Navarro becomes Draculas Navarro and Juan Carlos de Borbón becomes Jonathan Carolus (prince of Franconia). The original Transylvania becomes Galitzia and the Pazo de Meirás becomes the vampire's castle. All Murnau's characters find equivalence in the political actors of the Spanish transition to democracy.

Nosferatu the Vampyre, a 1979 remake of the film was directed and written by Werner Herzog and starred Klaus Kinski. Although based on the 1922 film, the characters' names are taken from the Bram Stoker novel.

A remake by director David Lee Fisher, starring Doug Jones as Count Orlok, premiered in November 2023 at the Emagine Theater in Novi, Michigan. The film uses green screen to insert colorized backgrounds from the original film atop live-action, a process Fisher previously used for his remake The Cabinet of Dr. Caligari (2005). It was later released on video on demand via Amazon Prime Video in September 2024 and on streaming though Apple TV+ on 18 October 2024.

In July 2015, a remake was announced with Robert Eggers writing and directing. It was reported in September 2022 that Eggers' remake would be distributed by Focus Features, with Bill Skarsgård set to star as Orlok and Lily-Rose Depp as Ellen Hutter. Willem Dafoe, Nicholas Hoult, and Emma Corrin also appear. The film wrapped principal photography on 19 May 2023. The film's first teaser trailer was released on 24 June 2024, and the film itself later released on 25 December 2024.

== See also ==
- Boo! (1932 film), an American short film by Albert DeMond that uses excerpts of Nosferatu for humorous effect
- List of cult films
- List of German films of 1919–1932
- Gothic film
- List of films considered the best

== Bibliography ==
- Brill, Olaf, Film Nosferatu, Eine Symphonie des Grauens (GER 1922) (in German), archived from the original on 19 August 2009 (1921-1922 reports and reviews)
- Eisner, Lotte H. (1967). Murnau. Der Klassiker des deutschen Films (in German). Velber/Hannover: Friedrich Verlag.
- Eisner, Lotte H. (1980). Hoffmann, Hilmar; Schobert, Walter (eds.). Die dämonische Leinwand (in German). Frankfurt am Main. ISBN 3-596-23660-6.
- Giesen, Rolf (2019). The Nosferatu Story: The Seminal Horror Film, Its Predecessors and Its Enduring Legacy. McFarland & Company. ISBN 978-1476672984.
- Grafe, Frieda (2003). Patalas, Enno (ed.). Licht aus Berlin: Lang/Lubitsch/Murnau (in German). Berlin: Verlag Brinkmann & Bose. ISBN 978-3922660811.
- Jackson, Kevin (2013). Nosferatu eine Symphonie des Grauens. British Film Institute. ISBN 978-1844576500.
- Joslin, Lyndon W. (2017). Count Dracula Goes to the Movies: Stoker's Novel Adapted (3rd ed.). McFarland & Company. ISBN 978-1476669878.
- Magistrale, Tony (2005). Abject Terrors: Surveying the Modern and Postmodern Horror Film. Peter Lang. ISBN 978-0820470566.
- Marriott, James; Newman, Kim (2018) [1st pub. 2006]. The Definitive Guide to Horror Movies. London: Carlton Books. ISBN 978-1-78739-139-0.
- Meßlinger, Karin; Thomas, Vera (2003). Prinzler, Hans Helmut (ed.). Friedrich Wilhelm Murnau: ein Melancholiker des Films (in German). Berlin: Bertz Verlag GbR. ISBN 3-929470-25-X.
