= Nosferatu (2024 film) =

Film by Robert Eggers

- Theatrical release poster
- Directed by: Robert Eggers
- Screenplay by: Robert Eggers
- Based on: Nosferatu: A Symphony of Horror by Henrik Galeen; Dracula by Bram Stoker
- Produced by: Jeff Robinov; John Graham; Chris Columbus; Eleanor Columbus; Robert Eggers
- Starring: Bill Skarsgård; Nicholas Hoult; Lily-Rose Depp; Aaron Taylor-Johnson; Emma Corrin; Willem Dafoe
- Cinematography: Jarin Blaschke
- Edited by: Louise Ford
- Music by: Robin Carolan
- Production companies: Maiden Voyage Pictures; Studio 8; Birch Hill Road Entertainment
- Distributed by: Focus Features (United States); Universal Pictures (international)
- Release dates: December 2, 2024 (Berlin); December 25, 2024 (United States)
- Running time: 132 minutes
- Country: United States
- Language: English
- Budget: $50 million
- Box office: $182.1 million

Nosferatu is a 2024 American gothic horror film written and directed by Robert Eggers. It is a remake of Nosferatu: A Symphony of Horror (1922), which was in turn inspired by Bram Stoker's novel Dracula (1897); the film combines elements of both. It stars Bill Skarsgård, Nicholas Hoult, Lily-Rose Depp, Aaron Taylor-Johnson, Emma Corrin, and Willem Dafoe.

Development began in 2015, when Eggers planned to make it his second film; he described it as a passion project, but eventually opted to delay its production. Skarsgård and Depp were cast in lead roles in September 2022. Filming took place primarily at Barrandov Studios in Prague between February and May 2023.

Nosferatu had its world premiere in Berlin on December 2, 2024, and was theatrically released in the United States by Focus Features on December 25. The film received positive reviews from critics and was a commercial success, grossing $182.1 million worldwide on a $50 million budget, becoming Eggers' highest-grossing film. At the 97th Academy Awards, the film earned nominations for Best Cinematography, Best Costume Design, Best Production Design, and Best Makeup and Hairstyling.

== Plot ==
As a young girl, Ellen prays for a companion to ease her loneliness, inadvertently contacting a powerful being known as the Nosferatu and forging a psychic link with it.

In 1838, Ellen is newly married to Thomas Hutter, and they live in Wisburg, Germany. Thomas's employer, Herr Knock, sends him to Transylvania to sell the decrepit Grünewald Manor to the reclusive Count Orlok. Thomas leaves Ellen in the care of his friend Friedrich Harding and Friedrich's pregnant wife, Anna, who have two daughters. Unknown to Thomas, Knock is allied with Orlok.

In a Transylvanian hamlet, the locals shun Thomas when he mentions Castle Orlok. That night, he witnesses a group of Roma exhuming and staking a suspected vampire's corpse, which gushes blood. By morning, the hamlet is deserted, and his horse has disappeared. Thomas continues on foot until a mysterious carriage takes him to Orlok's castle.

During dinner, Thomas is distracted by Orlok's appearance and cuts his hand, agitating the Count. He awakens on the dining room floor the following morning. Orlok finalizes the sale and takes Thomas's locket, which contains a lock of Ellen's hair. Thomas discovers bite marks on his chest and grows increasingly ill and frightened. While attempting to escape, he finds Orlok asleep in a crypt, lying naked and decayed inside a coffin. When the Count awakens and pursues him, Thomas falls into a river and is rescued by Eastern Orthodox nuns. They explain that Orlok became a vampire after making a pact with the Devil. Orlok then sails toward Wisburg in his coffin aboard a ship carrying plague-infested rats.

Meanwhile, Ellen begins experiencing seizures and sleepwalking under Orlok's influence. Her doctor, Wilhelm Sievers, consults his former mentor, Albin Eberhart von Franz, a Swiss scientist ostracized for his occult beliefs. Von Franz confirms that Ellen is under Nosferatu's demonic influence and discovers that sunlight can kill the creature. Knock is institutionalized after killing and eating sheep raw.

Orlok's arrival in Wisburg unleashes a devastating plague. Knock escapes confinement and leads Orlok to Grünewald Manor. Appearing to Ellen in her nightmares, Orlok claims that Thomas has effectively sold her to him in exchange for his commission on the property sale, although Thomas could not understand the documents written in Orlok's language. Orlok demands that Ellen submit to him within three days or he will kill Thomas.

Ellen awakens to find Anna under attack by plague-infested rats. She berates Thomas for allowing Orlok to exploit him, and their subsequent sexual encounter is troubled. In retaliation, Orlok kills Anna and her two daughters. When Friedrich sees Orlok's bite marks on Thomas, he realizes that the couple's warnings were true. Overwhelmed by grief and stricken with the plague, Friedrich dies at his family's graves.

Von Franz's research indicates that Nosferatu can be destroyed only through the willing sacrifice of a fair maiden. Realizing that she alone can stop the plague, Ellen conspires with von Franz to keep Thomas away while she confronts Orlok. Thomas, von Franz, and Sievers travel to Grünewald Manor, where they accidentally kill Knock after discovering him sleeping in Orlok's coffin.

Meanwhile, Ellen summons Orlok and willingly allows him to feed on her, keeping him occupied until sunrise. The sunlight destroys Nosferatu, ending his threat. Thomas returns and holds Ellen's hand as she dies. Von Franz confirms that her sacrifice has freed them from Nosferatu.

== Cast ==
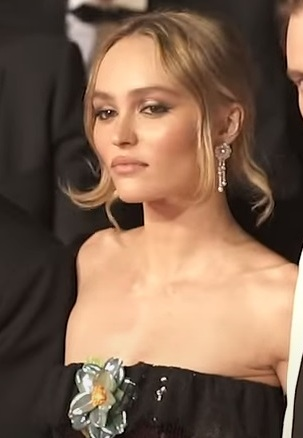
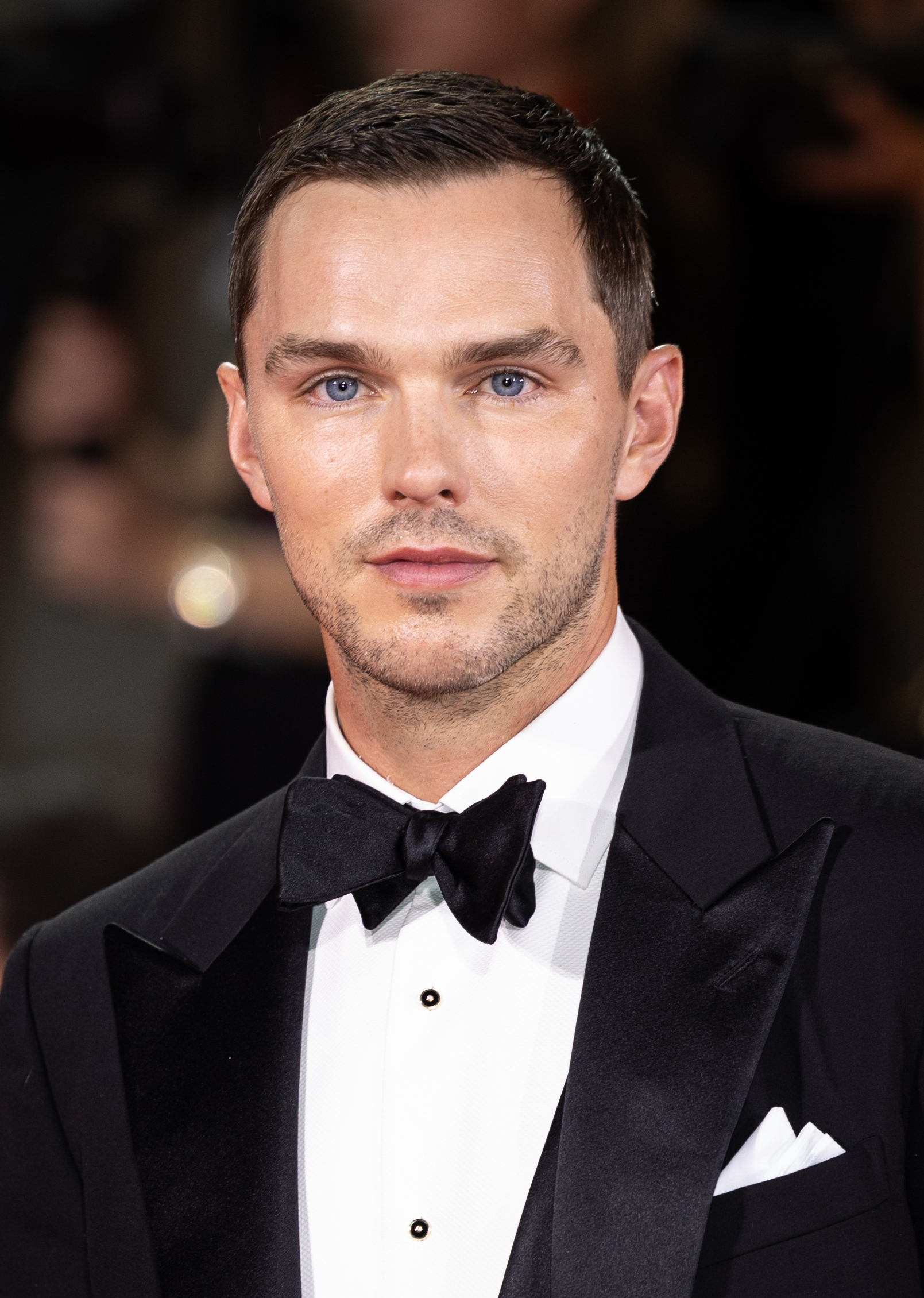
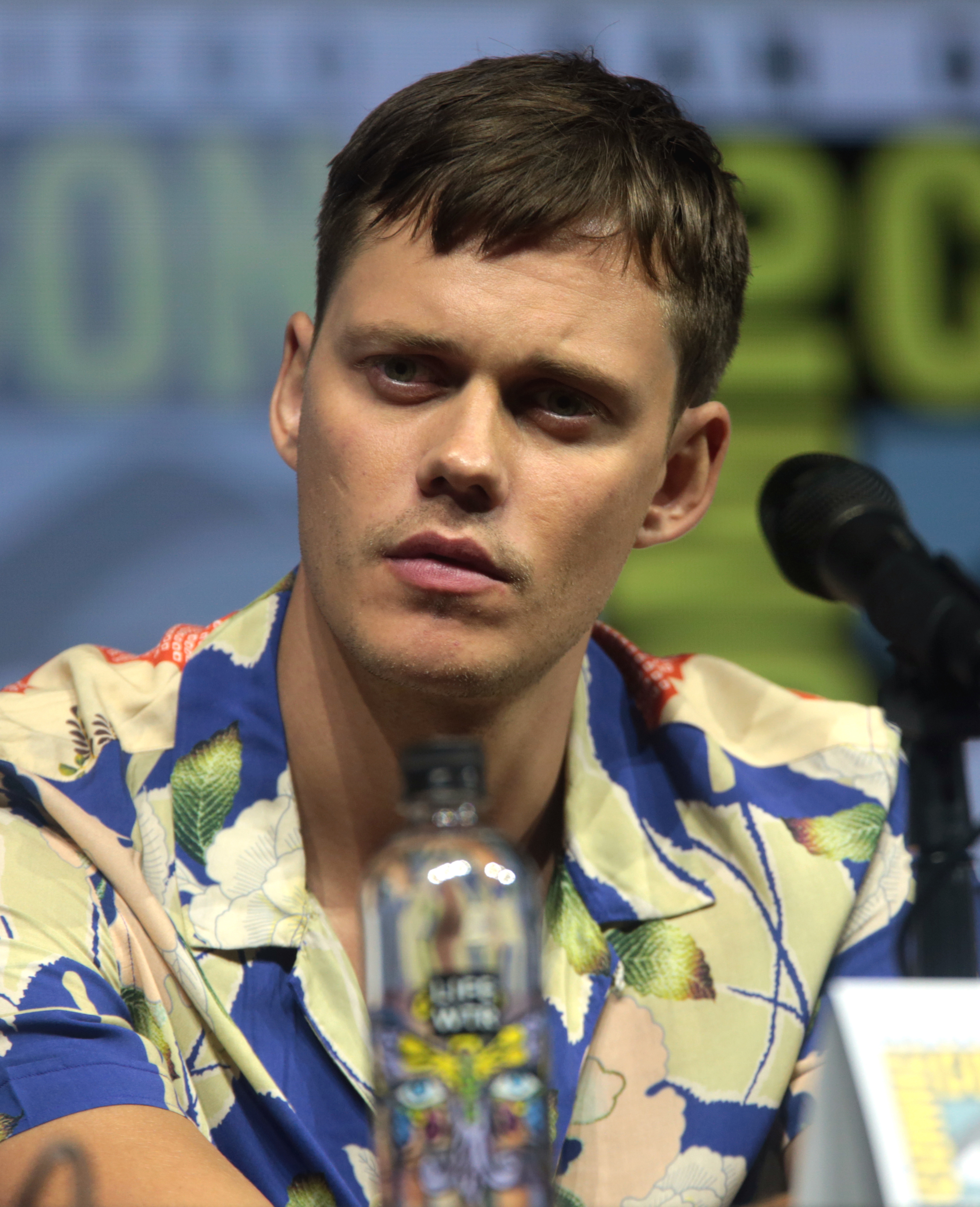
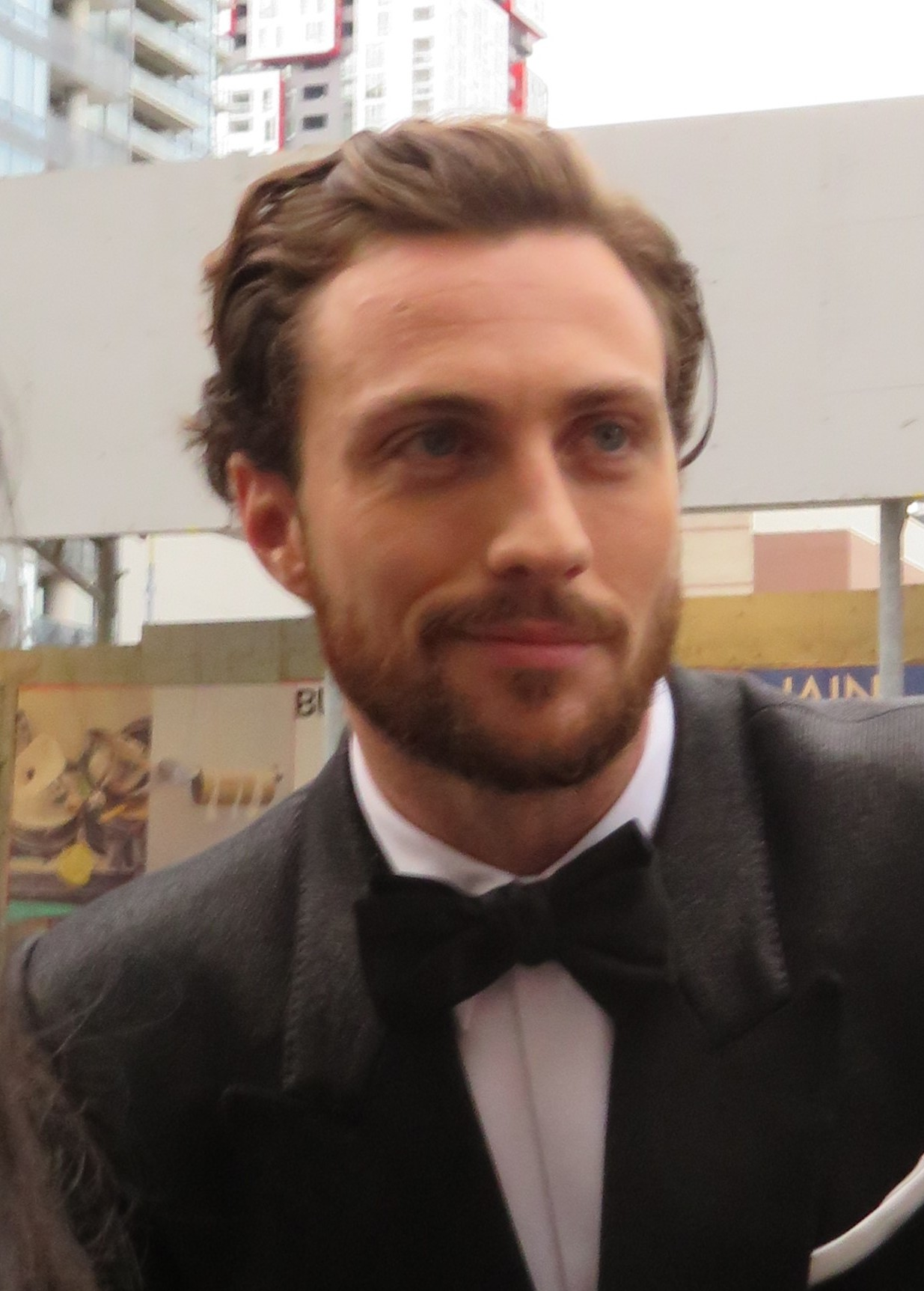
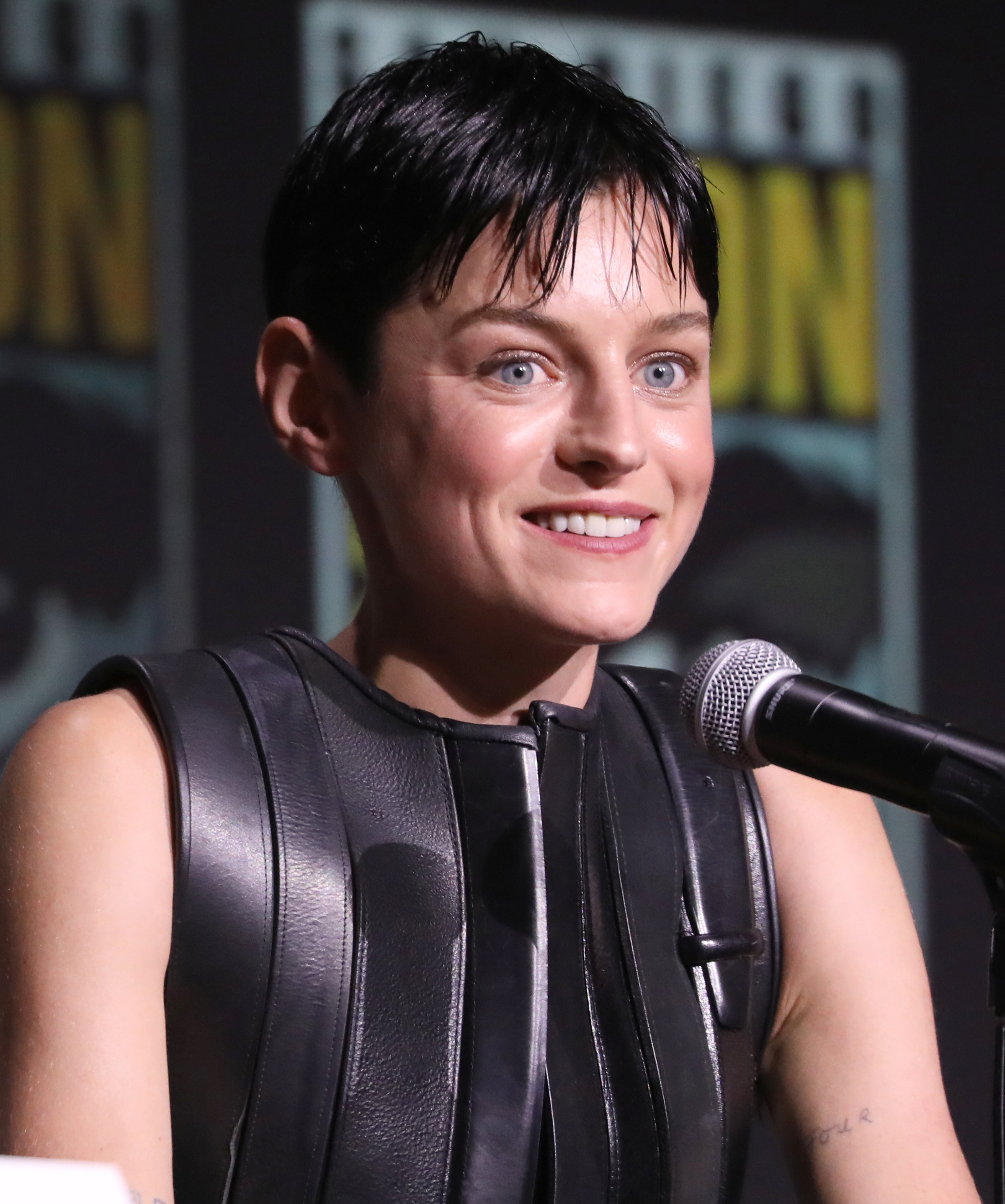
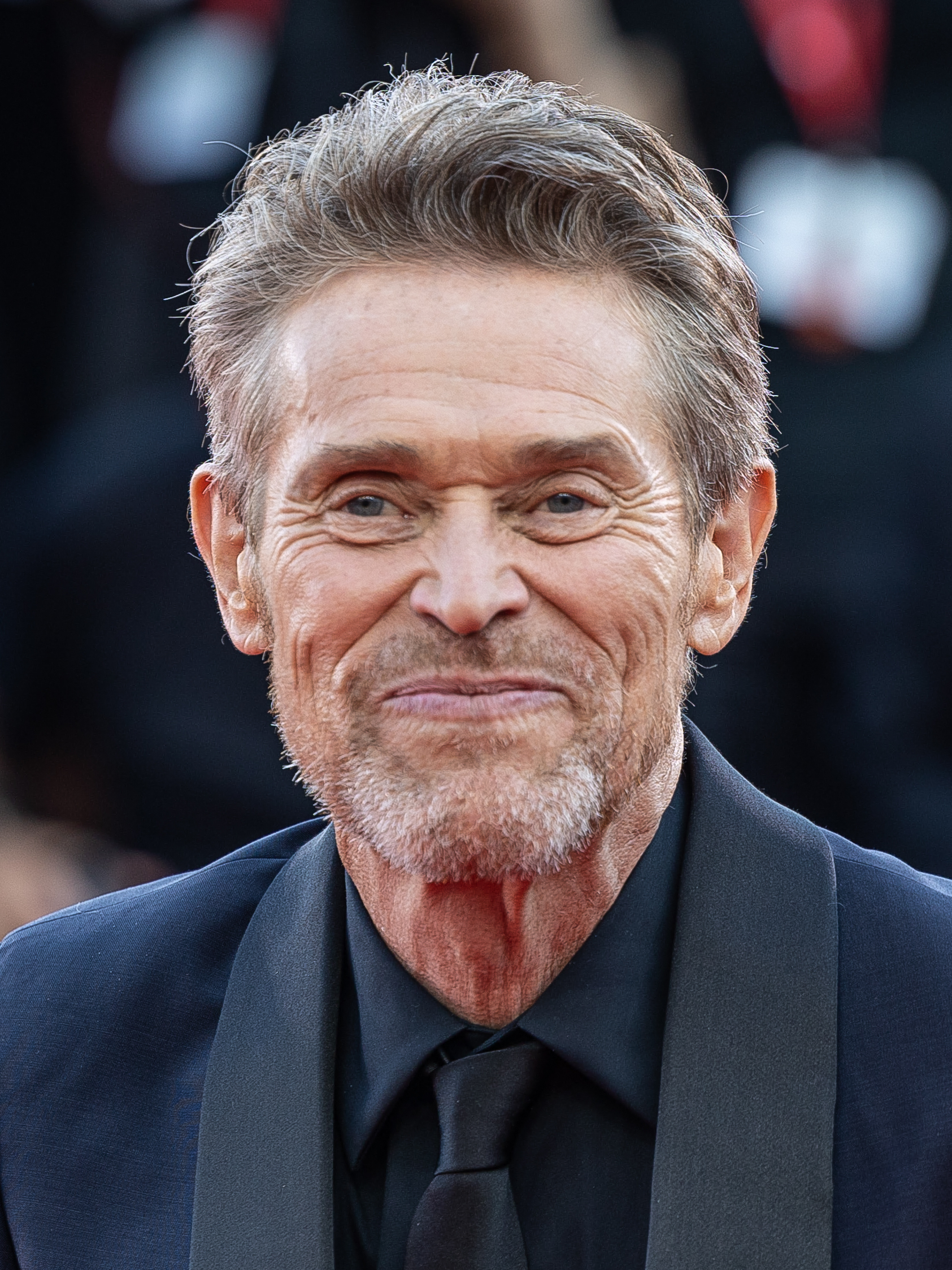
Nosferatu stars Lily-Rose Depp, Nicholas Hoult, Bill Skarsgård, Aaron Taylor-Johnson, Emma Corrin, and Willem Dafoe.
- Lily-Rose Depp as Ellen Hutter: A woman who in her lonely youth sought "a guardian angel, a spirit of comfort... anything". This wish opens the door—through a psychic connection—to the Nosferatu, who becomes obsessed with her. Wife of Thomas. Based on Bram Stoker's character Mina Harker.
- Nicholas Hoult as Thomas Hutter: A spineless cowardly real estate agent living in the German city of Wisburg. He wishes to become a partner in the Knock brokerage, so he will take on any task to get the promotion. Husband of Ellen. Based on Bram Stoker's character Jonathan Harker.
- Bill Skarsgård as Count Orlok / Nosferatu: A mysterious nobleman and vampire who lives alone in his ruined castle and wants to acquire a new property in Germany. It is suggested he was once a Solomonar who was cursed by the Devil to become a vampire. Sunlight is lethal to him and he can only inhabit the "cursed land" where he is buried. Based on Bram Stoker's character Count Dracula.
- Aaron Taylor-Johnson as Friedrich Harding: A wealthy shipbuilder, Anna's husband, father to Clara and Louise, and a vampire skeptic. Based on Bram Stoker's character Arthur Holmwood.
- Willem Dafoe as Prof. Albin Eberhart von Franz: A controversial Swiss philosopher, expert in alchemy, mysticism and the occult. He is the only character who truly understands the strange psychic connection between Count Orlok and Ellen. Based on Bram Stoker's character Abraham Van Helsing, whose counterpart was Bulwer in the silent film.
- Emma Corrin as Anna Harding: Friedrich's pregnant wife, mother to Clara and Louise, and Ellen's confidante and best friend. Based on Henrik Galeen's character Ruth, who is in turn based on Bram Stoker's character Lucy Westenra.
- Ralph Ineson as Dr. Wilhelm Sievers: A doctor that tries to treat Ellen with conventional "modern" medicine. Based on Bram Stoker's character John Seward.
- Simon McBurney as Herr Knock: Owner of the Knock brokerage firm and Count Orlok's devoted servant. He employs Thomas in the purchase and sale of Grünewald Manor after making a secret pact with Orlok. He has delusions that force him to eat living beings. Based on Bram Stoker's character Renfield.
- Adéla Hesová as Clara Harding
  - Ella Bernstein as the English voice for Clara
- Milena Konstantinova as Louise Harding
  - Meredith Diggins as the English voice for Louise

== Production ==
=== Development ===
In July 2015, the remake of Nosferatu (1922) was announced with Robert Eggers writing and directing. Jay Van Hoy and Lars Knudsen were slated to produce the film for Studio 8. In November 2016, Eggers expressed surprise that the Nosferatu remake was his second planned film, saying, "It feels ugly and blasphemous and egomaniacal and disgusting for a filmmaker in my place to do Nosferatu next. I was really planning on waiting a while, but that's how fate shook out." During an interview with Den of Geek around the release of The Lighthouse (2019), Eggers revealed that although he had dedicated a lot of time to bringing the story into the 21st century, he did not know when or if it would happen. He said that he "spent so many years and so much time [...] it would be a real shame if it never happened".

=== Script ===
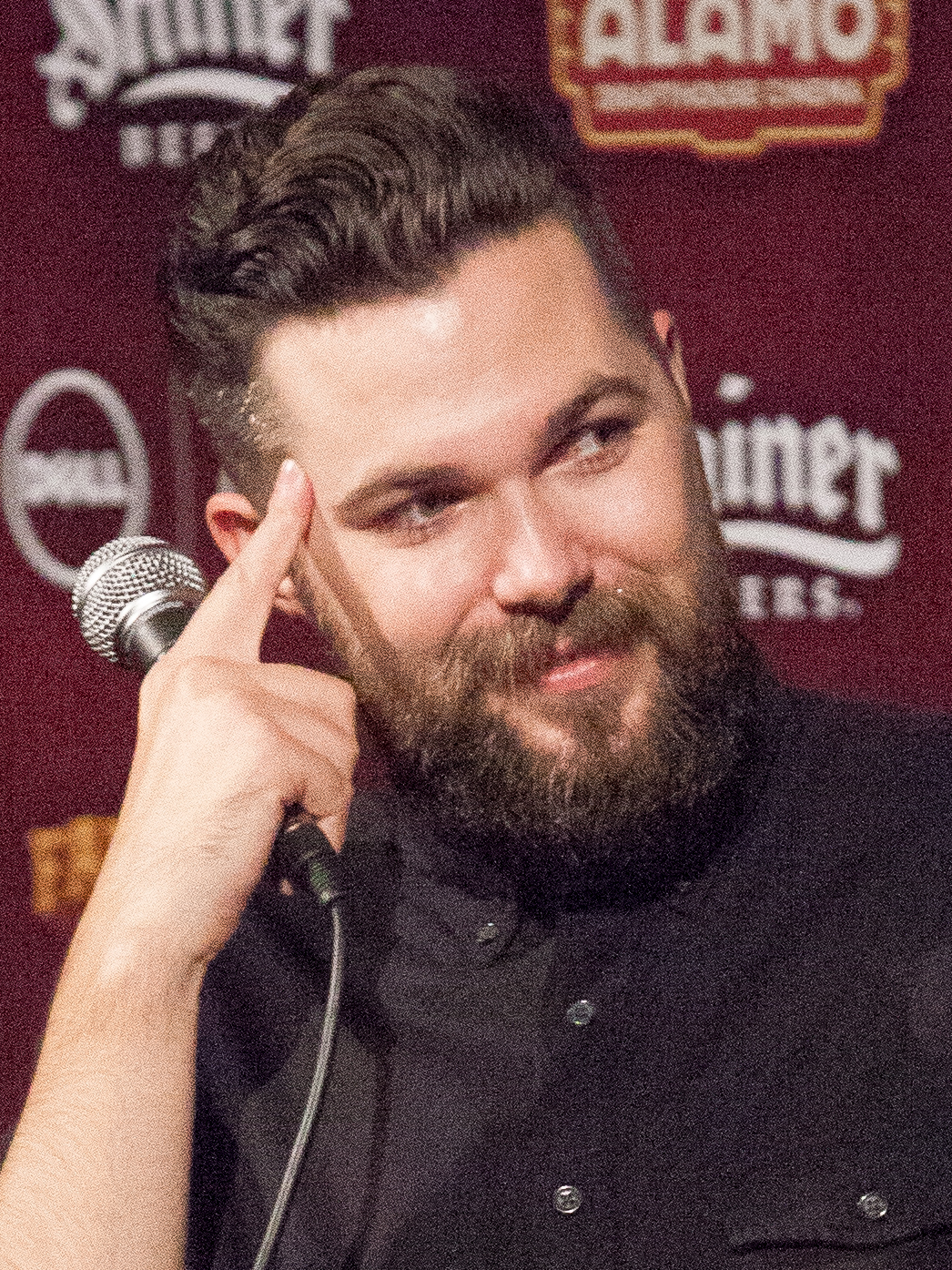
Writer-director Robert Eggers had adapted Nosferatu into a play in high school.

Eggers's early fascination with Nosferatu ignited a passion for filmmaking that would shape his career. He became inspired by both Henrik Galeen's screenplay and Bram Stoker's 1897 novel Dracula and with high school classmate Ashley Kelly-Tata adapted the story for the stage, performing it at their school. Their production caught the eye of Edouard Langlois, who invited them to transfer it to New York City's Edwin Booth Theatre. Eggers stated that "vampirism and Dracula is the thing that I've been thinking about and looking at for a long time". "I had read Montague Summers as a teenager, and many other authors of vampire lore, but I think, until I set out to make Nosferatu, I was still too contaminated by the cinematic tropes. And so, you're infusing things you're reading with cinematic tropes that aren't there. In doing the research to write this script, I needed to be disciplined to forget what I knew. And then, you start looking at the really early vampire accounts, and you're like, 'They're not even drinking blood, they're just strangling people, or suffocating people, or fucking them to death.' And that was really interesting". He also decided to let Orlok drink from the victims' chest instead of their neck, as old folklores often imagined vampires drinking blood from the chest right above the heart.

The character of Orlok is partially inspired by Vlad Dracula, the 15th-century Voivode of Wallachia, after whom the original Dracula was named. Eschewing the monstrous appearance of F. W. Murnau's Orlok or the Anglo-literary vampire appearance, Eggers preferred the appearance of a folk vampire, claiming that "there's never been a version of Dracula or Nosferatu dressed like a Transylvanian nobleman with authentic Hungarian attire from the 16th century." The count was written more like an undead corpse, instead of looking sexy or as an actual monster, an element from early vampire myths. Costume designer Linda Muir sought inspiration from the Transylvanian military from around 1560 to the mid-1600s, incorporating pieces of clothing such as dolman, mente or kolpak into Orlok's costume. Eggers explained that Orlok was given a mustache because "there's no way this guy can't have a mustache". In old Transylvanian culture, all men who could grow a mustache would have a mustache. According to prosthetic makeup effects designer David White, Orlok's physique was partially influenced by Ötzi, a natural mummy discovered in 1991 in the Ötztal Alps: "[Eggers] really wanted the feeling of Orlok having had all life sucked from him, every last drop of blood." Conceptualizing Orlok as an ancient Romanian count, Eggers made the decision to have him speak a reconstructed form of the Dacian language in the film, while Romanian and Romani are spoken by other Transylvanian residents.

The film makes a nod to director Victor Sjöström's silent classic, The Phantom Carriage (1921). Eggers also explored the work of French neurologist Jean-Martin Charcot and his findings on so-called hysteria and took inspiration from Andrzej Żuławski's films Possession (1981), The Devil (1972) and The Third Part of the Night (1971). Further influences on Eggers's adaptation include Svengali (1931), Beauty and the Beast (1946), Great Expectations (1946), The Queen of Spades (1949), Andriesh (1954), The Innocents (1961), The Eve Before Ivan Kupala (1968), and The She-Butterfly (1973).

=== Casting ===
In August 2017, actress Anya Taylor-Joy was cast, reteaming with Eggers after The Witch (2015); she was still attached to the project in 2020, though her specific role had not been announced. Harry Styles had been cast to star opposite Taylor-Joy, but dropped out of the project in 2021 citing scheduling concerns.

Eggers initially considered several talents to play the role of Count Orlok, including Daniel Day-Lewis and Mads Mikkelsen. Finally, on September 30, 2022, it was announced that Swedish actor Bill Skarsgård would star in the role of Count Orlok, whom Eggers had also had in mind for the film adaptation years earlier. However, before he was offered the role of the film's titular vampire, Skarsgård had originally auditioned for and been offered the role of Thomas Hutter. After many failed attempts to make the film, Skarsgård's portrayal of Pennywise in It (2017) and It Chapter Two (2019) attracted popularity, aiding the recasting decision. The addition of actress Lily-Rose Depp, replacing Anya Taylor-Joy, was also announced on September 30, 2022. Casting director Kharmel Cochrane originally texted Depp and apologized to her in advance, dismissing her as a serious contender for the role of Ellen Hutter because she thought Depp couldn't act as she hadn't seen anything that showed her capable of doing that in addition to the nepotism accusations of her work because of her parents Vanessa Paradis and Johnny Depp's influence, but Cochrane changed her mind once Lily-Rose auditioned and proved her wrong. Nicholas Hoult entered negotiations to join the cast in October 2022, and had been officially cast the following month.

Willem Dafoe joined the cast in January 2023, re-teaming with Eggers after The Lighthouse and The Northman (2022); Dafoe had not only previously portrayed Max Schreck/Count Orlok in Shadow of the Vampire (2000), but had been slated to play the role again for Eggers. Emma Corrin would join the cast the following month. Aaron Taylor-Johnson, Simon McBurney and Ralph Ineson were announced as joining cast at the start of production in late February 2023. Romanian TikTok personality Bunica Gherghina was cast as the elderly lady at the Transylvanian inn. Additionally, the film features around 5,000 trained rats.

=== Filming ===
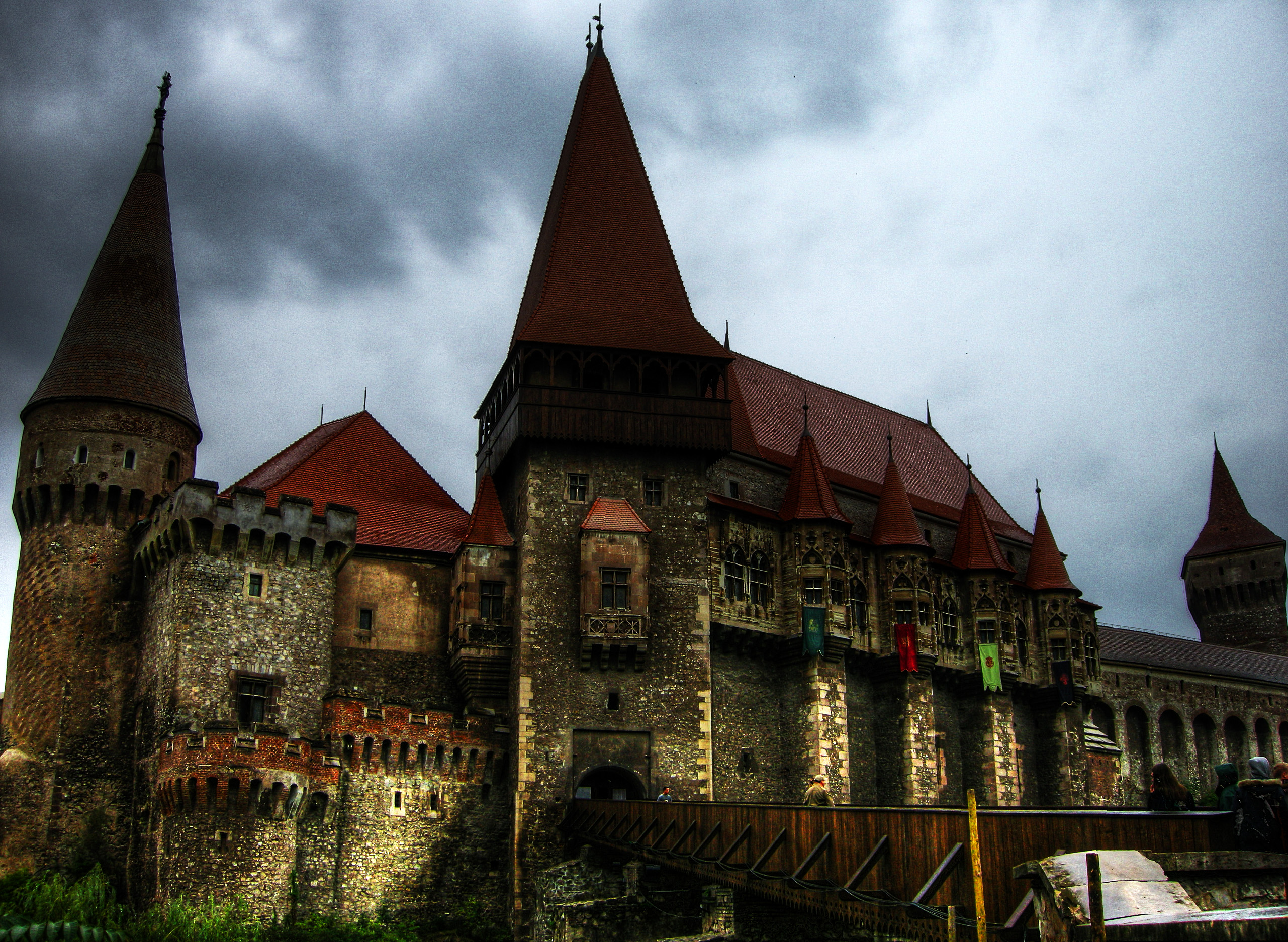
Corvin Castle, located in Transylvania, is used as Orlok Castle in the film.

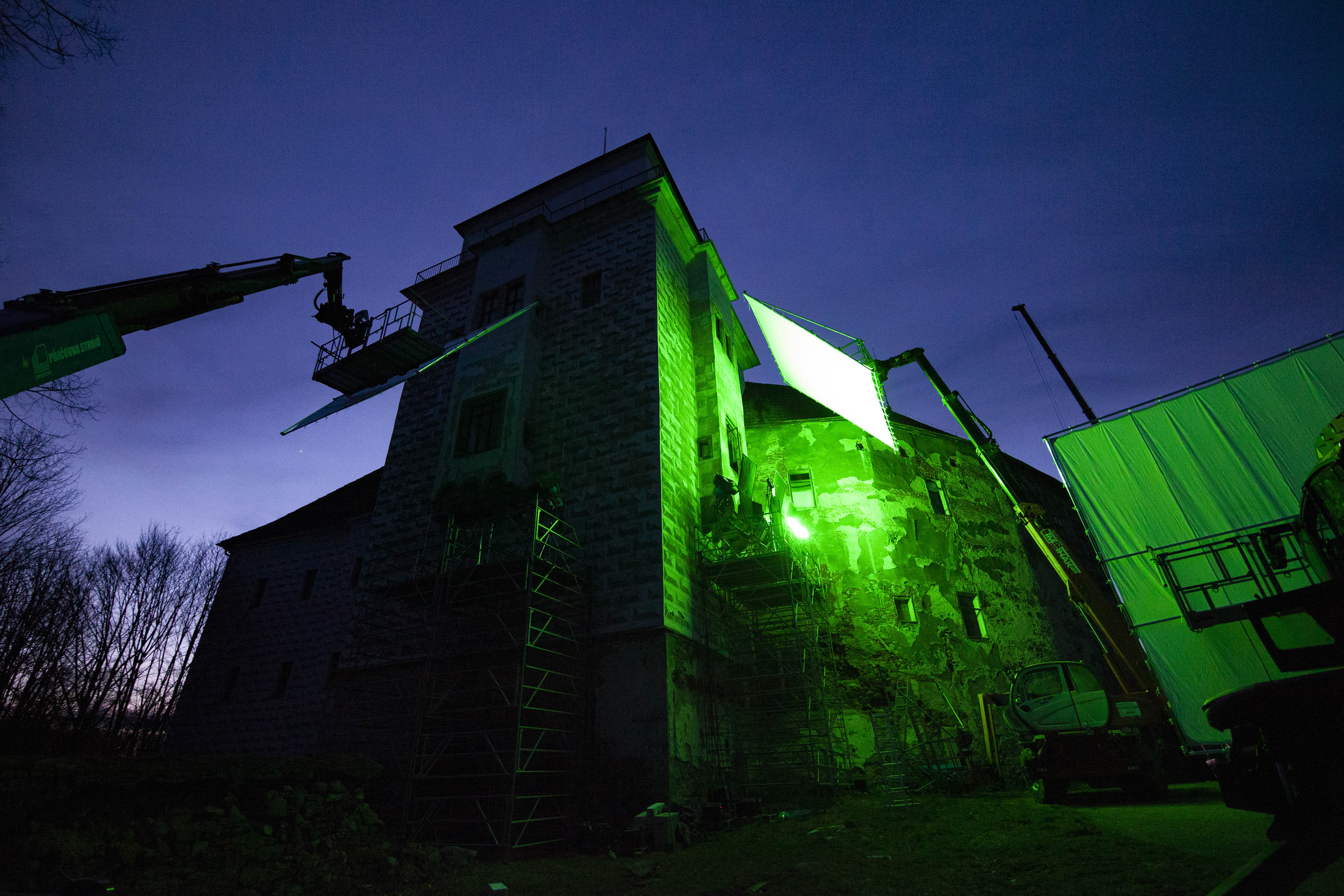
Rožmitál pod Třemšínem Castle, one of the filming locations in the Czech Republic

Nosferatu was shot on 35mm film in color by cinematographer Jarin Blaschke, adopting a desaturated look using special filters. Principal photography began in the Czech Republic on February 20, 2023, with filming taking place at Barrandov Studios in Prague by March. Later that month, the crew was shooting on location at the 14th-century Rožmitál pod Třemšínem Castle in Rožmitál pod Třemšínem, Pernštejn Castle and Prague's Invalidovna complex, a Baroque building registered as a national landmark. Some exterior shots were captured in Corvin Castle in Romania. Filming wrapped on May 19, 2023.

To prepare for playing Count Orlok, Skarsgård lost a significant amount of weight and, refusing to have his voice digitally modulated, worked with the Icelandic opera singer Ásgerður Júníusdóttir to lower his vocal range and character, incorporating Mongolian throat singing into his lines, and spent up to six hours a day having prosthetic makeup applied. Skarsgård likened his experience to "conjuring pure evil". Hoult said he felt "real fear" when wolves on set had to be restrained before filming chase scenes with him. The film makes use of several custom-made props, some of which were kept by the actors after filming. Eggers gifted Depp the prop of Ellen's locket, and Hoult kept and framed Orlok's prosthetic penis worn by Skarsgård in the film.

The scene of Hutter's arrival in the Transylvanian village was captured in one shot. The sequence is made up of nonprofessional Romani actors, musicians and dancers and features an appearance by Czech musician and actor Jordan Haj. Roughly 30 takes were filmed of what Eggers said was all "very carefully choreographed and rehearsed ahead of time in a warehouse in Prague". The village set was built outside of Prague and was based on the crew's studies of vernacular architecture museums in Romania and Transylvania. In a November 2024 interview with The Hollywood Reporter, Eggers stated that the production used practical rain machines, wind tunnels, and vintage lenses to "evoke a tactile feeling of dread" instead of using digital effects.

=== Post-production ===
VFX supervisor Angela Barson said that the goal of the visual effects team was to digitally match the dark gothic aesthetic across 253 shots, or 90 of the 132 minutes of screentime. She worked closely with production designer Craig Lathrop to work out which sets would be locations, or builds and where VFX would take over and with cinematographer Jarin Blaschke to make sure all the plates were framed, lit and captured to give the best possible final result. This is editor Louise Ford's fourth feature with Eggers.

== Music ==
The score was provided by Robin Carolan. Carolan intentionally wanted to move away from the typical horror score, focusing on capturing the story's melancholic and tragic elements. He also credited his obsessive listening to Sky Ferreira's 2019 single "Downhill Lullaby" for putting him "in a certain mood" for some of Ellen's scenes.

With "Goodbye" and "Increase thy Thunders", the first two pieces of music from the film were released by Back Lot Music in late September 2024. The full soundtrack album with a total of 43 pieces of music is scheduled to be released on vinyl and two CDs by Sacred Bones Records and Waxwork Records. At the helm as conductor is British-born Daniel Pioro. Carolan and Eggers struggled to perfect their sound, a process marked by their meticulous attention to detail, which Carolan describes as "almost telepathic".

== Release ==
Nosferatu had its world premiere on December 2, 2024, at the Zoo Palast cinema in Berlin, Germany. The film was theatrically released in the United States by Focus Features and internationally by Universal Pictures on December 25, 2024. The film was shown in IMAX, as well as in Dolby Cinema, and screened in 35mm in some theatres, including Grauman's Chinese Theatre in California.

=== Home media ===
The film was released on digital platforms on January 21, 2025. An extended version was also released on 4K Ultra HD Blu-ray, Blu-ray, and DVD on February 18, 2025, by Studio Distribution Services. The extension apparently amounts to about 4 minutes of footage. It primarily provides a fuller explanation of supernatural events and Romanian folklore, relevant to the story.

== Reception ==
=== Box office ===
Nosferatu grossed $95.6 million in the United States and Canada, and $86.5 million in other territories, for a worldwide gross of $182.1 million. It became Focus Features' second highest-grossing domestic release and third highest-worldwide, and Deadline Hollywood calculated the film made a net profit of $70 million.

In the United States and Canada, Nosferatu was released alongside A Complete Unknown, Babygirl, and The Fire Inside and was originally projected to gross around $25 million from 2,992 theaters in its five-day opening weekend. After making $11.55 million on its first day and $7.6 million on its second, estimates were raised to $42 million. It went on to debut to $21.7 million in its opening weekend (and a total of $40.8 million over the five days), finishing in third behind Sonic the Hedgehog 3 and Mufasa: The Lion King. In its second weekend, the film made $13.1 million, finishing third again. It made a respective $6.9 million and $4.1 million in its third and fourth weekends, dropping out of the box office top ten in its fifth after adding $2 million.

=== Critical response ===
On the review aggregator website Rotten Tomatoes, 85% of 385 critics' reviews are positive, with an average rating of 8/10. The website's consensus reads: "Marvelously orchestrated by director Robert Eggers, Nosferatu is a behemoth of a horror film that is equal parts repulsive and seductive." Metacritic, which uses a weighted average, assigned the film a score of 78 out of 100, based on 59 critics, indicating "generally favorable" reviews. Audiences polled by CinemaScore gave the movie an average grade of "B–" on an A+ to F scale.

The Hollywood Reporter's David Rooney praised the direction, screenplay and performances, calling the film "exciting, repulsive and beautiful", and added that "It's thrilling to experience a movie so assured in the way it builds and sustains fear, so hypnotically scary as it grabs you by the throat and never lets go." IndieWire's David Ehrlich similarly praised the direction and singled out Depp's performance, before stating that "like all of Eggers' films, of which Nosferatu is the richest and most fully realized, it draws a spellbinding power from the friction it finds between historical social mores and the eternal human thirsts they exist to keep in check."

Matt Zoller Seitz of RogerEbert.com gave the movie a perfect 4/4, stating, "Technically and logistically, this movie is an awesome achievement. The wind, the rain, and the darkness seem to do Nosferatu's bidding. The force of the monster's unknowable malevolence seems to distort the movie itself, making it shudder and break down. It's made with the most modern filmmaking technology but feels like an artifact from another century, like one of those inscribed tablets that adventurers find in a tomb and insist on translating aloud even though there's a drawing of a terrifying demon on it. It reminded me of being a child and seeing the original "The Exorcist" and feeling as if I was seeing a documentary record of evil, one that was itself cursed, and that I should not even be looking at, because by looking at it, I ran the risk of releasing that evil into the world."

John Mulderig at Catholic Review noted: "Film buffs will easily recognize that the atmospheric horror yarn Nosferatu (Focus) is both a variation on and an homage to the eponymous 1922 ... foundational film[;] however, the newcomer is both artistically flawed and, ultimately, morally unbridled. ... [']Nosferatu eventually goes off the ethical rails altogether as it moves toward a conclusion bogged down by the muddled metaphysics espoused by Von Franz".

In July 2025, The Hollywood Reporter ranked the film at number 13 on its list of the "25 Best Horror Movies of the 21st Century."

== Accolades ==
Award	Date of ceremony	Category	Recipient(s)	Result	Ref.
Hollywood Music in Media Awards	November 20, 2024	Best Original Score – Horror/Thriller Film	Robin Carolan	Won	
National Board of Review	December 4, 2024	Outstanding Achievement in Cinematography	Jarin Blaschke	Won	
Astra Film and Creative Arts Awards	December 8, 2024	Best Horror or Thriller Feature	Nosferatu	Nominated	
Astra Film and Creative Arts Awards	December 8, 2024	Best Performance in a Horror or Thriller	Bill Skarsgård	Nominated	
Astra Film and Creative Arts Awards	December 8, 2024	Best Cinematography	Jarin Blaschke	Nominated	
Astra Film and Creative Arts Awards	December 8, 2024	Best Costume Design	Linda Muir	Nominated	
Astra Film and Creative Arts Awards	December 8, 2024	Best Makeup and Hairstyling	Nosferatu	Nominated	
Astra Film and Creative Arts Awards	December 8, 2024	Best Production Design	Craig Lathrop	Nominated	
Washington D.C. Area Film Critics Association	December 8, 2024	Best Cinematography	Jarin Blaschke	Won	
Washington D.C. Area Film Critics Association	December 8, 2024	Best Score	Robin Carolan	Nominated	
Washington D.C. Area Film Critics Association	December 8, 2024	Best Production Design	Craig Lathrop and Beatrice Brentnerova	Nominated	
San Diego Film Critics Society	December 9, 2024	Best Cinematography	Jarin Blaschke	Won	
San Diego Film Critics Society	December 9, 2024	Best Production Design	Craig Lathrop and Beatrice Brentnerova	Nominated	
San Diego Film Critics Society	December 9, 2024	Best Visual Effects	Nosferatu	Nominated	
Chicago Film Critics Association	December 12, 2024	Best Adapted Screenplay	Robert Eggers	Nominated	
Chicago Film Critics Association	December 12, 2024	Best Cinematography	Jarin Blaschke	Nominated	
Chicago Film Critics Association	December 12, 2024	Best Original Score	Robin Carolan	Nominated	
Chicago Film Critics Association	December 12, 2024	Best Costume Design	Linda Muir	Nominated	
Chicago Film Critics Association	December 12, 2024	Best Art Direction / Production Design	Nosferatu	Won	
St. Louis Film Critics Association	December 15, 2024	Best Horror Film	Nosferatu	Won	
St. Louis Film Critics Association	December 15, 2024	Best Cinematography	Jarin Blaschke	Won	
St. Louis Film Critics Association	December 15, 2024	Best Costume Design	Linda Muir	Nominated	
St. Louis Film Critics Association	December 15, 2024	Best Production Design	Craig Lathrop and Beatrice Brentnerova	Won	
St. Louis Film Critics Association	December 15, 2024	Best Visual Effects	Nosferatu	Nominated	
San Francisco Bay Area Film Critics Circle	December 15, 2024	Best Cinematography	Jarin Blaschke	Nominated	
San Francisco Bay Area Film Critics Circle	December 15, 2024	Best Production Design	Craig Lathrop	Nominated	
New York Film Critics Online	December 16, 2024	Best Cinematography	Jarin Blaschke	Nominated	
Seattle Film Critics Society	December 16, 2024	Best Cinematography	Jarin Blaschke	Nominated	
Seattle Film Critics Society	December 16, 2024	Best Costume Design	Linda Muir	Nominated	
Seattle Film Critics Society	December 16, 2024	Villain of the Year	Count Orlok (as portrayed by Bill Skarsgård)	Nominated	
Austin Film Critics Association	January 6, 2025	Best Film	Nosferatu	Nominated	
Austin Film Critics Association	January 6, 2025	Best Cinematography	Jarin Blaschke	Nominated	
Austin Film Critics Association	January 6, 2025	Best Original Score	Robin Carolan	Nominated	
Alliance of Women Film Journalists	January 7, 2025	Best Adapted Screenplay	Robert Eggers	Nominated	
Alliance of Women Film Journalists	January 7, 2025	Best Cinematography	Jarin Blaschke	Nominated	
Satellite Awards	January 26, 2025	Best Actress in a Motion Picture – Drama	Lily-Rose Depp	Nominated	
Satellite Awards	January 26, 2025	Best Cinematography	Jarin Blaschke	Nominated	
Satellite Awards	January 26, 2025	Best Costume Design	Linda Muir	Nominated	
Satellite Awards	January 26, 2025	Best Production Design	Craig Lathrop, Beatrice Brentnerova	Nominated	
Satellite Awards	January 26, 2025	Best Ensemble: Motion Picture	Nosferatu	Won	
British Society of Cinematographers	February 1, 2025	Best Cinematography in a Feature Film	Jarin Blaschke	Nominated	
London Critics Circle Film Awards	February 2, 2025	Film of the Year	Nosferatu	Nominated	
London Critics Circle Film Awards	February 2, 2025	British / Irish Performer of the Year	Nicholas Hoult	Nominated	
London Critics Circle Film Awards	February 2, 2025	Technical Achievement Award	Jarin Blaschke	Nominated	
Set Decorators Society of America	February 2, 2025	Best Achievement in Décor/Design of a Period Feature Film	Beatrice Brentnerova, Craig Lathrop	Nominated	
Costume Designers Guild Awards	February 6, 2025	Excellence in Period Film	Linda Muir	Won	
Critics' Choice Awards	February 7, 2025	Best Cinematography	Jarin Blaschke	Won	
Critics' Choice Awards	February 7, 2025	Best Production Design	Craig Lathrop and Beatrice Brentnerova	Nominated	
Critics' Choice Awards	February 7, 2025	Best Costume Design	Linda Muir	Nominated	
Critics' Choice Awards	February 7, 2025	Best Makeup and Hairstyling	Nosferatu	Nominated	
Visual Effects Society Awards	February 11, 2025	Outstanding Supporting Visual Effects in a Photoreal Feature	Angela Barson, Lisa Renney, David Scott, Dave Cook, Pavel Ságner	Nominated	
Society of Composers & Lyricists	February 12, 2025	David Raksin Award for Emerging Talent	Robin Carolan	Nominated	
British Academy Film Awards	February 16, 2025	Best Cinematography	Jarin Blaschke	Nominated	
British Academy Film Awards	February 16, 2025	Best Costume Design	Linda Muir	Nominated	
British Academy Film Awards	February 16, 2025	Best Makeup and Hair	David White, Traci Loader, and Suzanne Stokes-Munton	Nominated	
British Academy Film Awards	February 16, 2025	Best Original Music	Robin Carolan	Nominated	
British Academy Film Awards	February 16, 2025	Best Production Design	Craig Lathrop and Beatrice Brentnerova	Nominated	
Golden Reel Awards	February 23, 2025	Outstanding Achievement in Sound Editing – Feature Effects / Foley	Damian Volpe, Michael Fentum, Damian Volpe, Samir Foco, Mariusz Glabinski, Heikki Kossi, Joel Raabe	Nominated	
Academy Awards	March 2, 2025	Best Cinematography	Jarin Blaschke	Nominated	
Academy Awards	March 2, 2025	Best Costume Design	Linda Muir	Nominated	
Academy Awards	March 2, 2025	Best Production Design	Craig Lathrop	Nominated	
Academy Awards	March 2, 2025	Best Makeup and Hairstyling	David White, Traci Loader, and Suzanne Stokes-Munton	Nominated	
Golden Trailer Awards	May 29, 2025	Best Original Score	Focus Features / Wild Card Creative Group (for "Devourance H")	Nominated	
Golden Trailer Awards	May 29, 2025	Best Horror TV Spot (for a Feature Film)	Focus Features / Seismic Productions (for "Masterpiece of Horror")	Nominated	
Golden Trailer Awards	May 29, 2025	Best Horror TV Spot (for a Feature Film)	Focus Features / AV Squad (for "Little Dream")	Nominated	
Golden Trailer Awards	May 29, 2025	Best Horror/Thriller TrailerByte for a Feature Film	Focus Features / GrandSon (for "One by One")	Nominated	
Golden Trailer Awards	May 29, 2025	Best Viral Campaign for a Feature Film	Focus Features / Bond (for "TV Campaign")	Nominated	
Critics' Choice Super Awards	August 7, 2025	Best Horror Movie	Nosferatu	Nominated	
Critics' Choice Super Awards	August 7, 2025	Best Actor in a Horror Movie	Bill Skarsgård	Nominated	
Critics' Choice Super Awards	August 7, 2025	Best Actress in a Horror Movie	Lily-Rose Depp	Nominated	
