= Nosferatu (2023 film) =

American horror film

Nosferatu: A Symphony of Horror
- Promotional release poster
- Directed by: David Lee Fisher
- Written by: David Lee Fisher
- Based on: Nosferatu by; F. W. Murnau; Henrik Galeen; Dracula by Bram Stoker (uncredited)
- Produced by: Derek Zemrak; Leonard Pirkle; Paula Elins; Jenna Cedicci; Emrhys Cooper; Don Barton
- Starring: Doug Jones; Sarah Carter; Emrhys Cooper; Joely Fisher; Edgar Allan Poe
- Cinematography: Christopher Duddy
- Edited by: David Lee Fisher; Clifford Corigliana Jr.
- Music by: Eban Schletter
- Production companies: BlackCape Studios; Zemrak/Pirkle Productions
- Release dates: November 11, 2023 (Emagine Theater); October 18, 2024 (United States)
- Running time: 92 minutes
- Country: United States
- Language: English

Nosferatu: A Symphony of Horror is a 2023 American Gothic horror film. It is a remake of the 1922 silent film of the same title, which in turn is a loose adaptation of the novel Dracula by Bram Stoker. Directed and co-written by David Lee Fisher, it stars Doug Jones as Count Orlok, a vampire who terrorises the fictional town of Wisbourg, Germany to torment a young woman. The film premiered at the Emagine Theater in Novi, Michigan on November 11, 2023, prior to being released on video on demand via Amazon Prime Video in September 2024 and on Apple TV in the following month.

== Plot ==
In the German town of Wisbourg, Thomas Hutter is hired to sell a dilapidated property to reclusive Transylvanian nobleman, Count Orlok, by bewitched estate agent Herr Knock. He travels at the protestation of his wife Ellen, who moves in with their friends Wolfram and Ruth during his travels, concurrently plagued by nightmares. On his journey, Thomas encounters peasants who pitifully beg him not to go to Orlok's castle. He comes across an old tome describing the "Nosferatu", a vampire spawned from Belial.

Thomas arrives at the castle where he and Orlok dine and discuss Orlok's new property. Orlok attempts to drink from Thomas' thumb as he cuts it on a breadknife. Thomas becomes unconscious and awakes with a bite on his neck, which he initially attributes to insects. Orlok becomes infatuated with a photograph of Ellen and remarks she has "a pretty neck". In Wisbourg, Knock becomes manic after reading cabalistic writings from Orlok and is admitted to an asylum. Ruth attempts to seduce Ellen, who later sleepwalks as she is telepathically tormented by Orlok. Thomas deduces that Orlok is Nosferatu and escapes the castle, becoming addled and sheltering in a hospital. Orlok stows away on a ship bound for the city, spreading a plague among the crew and bringing it to Wisbourg. Knock escapes from his cell, ecstatic about Orlok's arrival.

Thomas returns to Wisbourg to find that the town is under quarantine, many having died from Orlok's plague, including Ruth. Thomas and Ellen agree that they must find a way to defeat Orlok. Ellen privately reads from the tome about Nosferatu, and learns that he can be defeated by exposing him to sunlight, to which he is vulnerable. Ellen feigns sickness, prompting Thomas to call upon Professor Bulwer, during which they witness Wolfram murdering Knock. Ellen submits to Orlok; unable to resist her innocent blood, Orlok feeds long enough until he is disintegrated by the rising sun. Orlok's house crumbles and Thomas vows to leave Wisbourg forever.

== Cast ==
- Doug Jones as Count Orlok/Nosferatu, based on Count Dracula
- Emrhys Cooper as Thomas Hutter, based on Johnathan Harker
- Sarah Carter as Ellen Hutter, based on Mina Harker
- Jack Turner as Wolfram Harding
- Joely Fisher as Ruth Harding
- Time Winters as Professor Sievers
- Eddie Allen (credited as Edgar Allan Poe) as Knock, based on Renfield
- George Maguire as Professor Bulwer
- Thomas Ian Nicholas as Blind Man

== Production ==
Nosferatu: A Symphony of Horror entered production after being successfully funded on Kickstarter on December 3, 2014. On April 13, 2016, it was reported that Doug Jones had been cast as Count Orlok in the film and that filming had begun. About 50-60 percent of the movie used green screen to insert colorized backgrounds from the original film behind the actors, a technique that director David Lee Fisher had previously used for his remake The Cabinet of Dr. Caligari (2005).

In an interview with Dread Central, Jones stated: "I don't think Orlok realizes how much he's faded. In his mind, he's still the dashing count he once was, and that dichotomy fascinated me". His makeup was restricted to his face and hands, and took four hours to apply. Regarding his portrayal, Jones said: "The farther you get from human, the harder it is to play, ... Orlok's humanity is still there, buried under layers of torment and hunger. That's where the real performance comes from—his desires, regrets, and fears". Fisher explained that this interpretation of Orlok was deliberately distanced from Klaus Kinski's portrayal and approached Max Schreck's original performance more closely, being "an elemental force of nature ... definitely destructive, but not necessarily evil".

== Release ==
After several years with no updates as to the status of the film, Nosferatu premiered at the Emagine Theater in Novi in November 2023. It was later released on video on demand via Amazon Prime Video in September 2024 and on Apple TV on 18 October 2024.

== Reception ==
Jones' performance as Orlok received mixed responses, with Tarryn Gaherty of Collider praising him as one of the best aspects of the film, "masterfully combin[ing] physical acting with prosthetics and practical effects", while Jennie Kermode of Eye For Film compared him unfavourably to prior Orlok performers, stating "he cannot capture the same air of uncanny charisma [as Max Schreck], which the film really depends on; neither can he compel the viewer's attention as Klaus Kinski did in his attempts".
