= Thomas Hutter =

- Nosferatu character
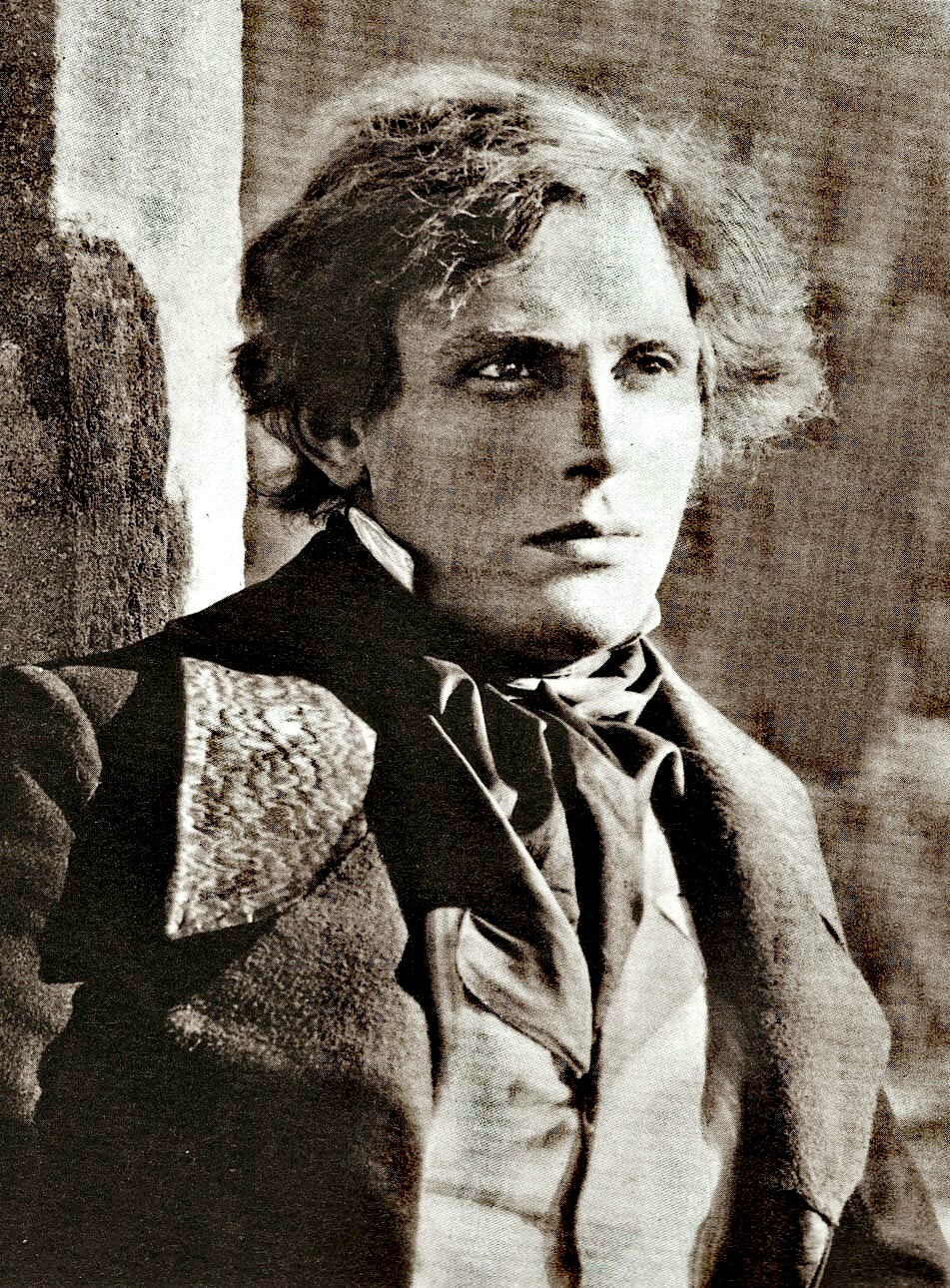
- Gustav von Wangenheim as Thomas Hutter in 1922
- Based on: Jonathan Harker
- Portrayed by: Gustav von Wangenheim (1922); Bruno Ganz (1979); Eddie Izzard (2000); Emrhys Cooper (2023); Nicholas Hoult (2024)

In-universe information
- Gender: Male
- Occupation: Real estate agent
- Spouse: Ellen Hutter (wife)
- Religion: Christian

Thomas Hutter is a fictional character and the main protagonist in the silent German expressionist horror film Nosferatu (1922) and other films based on it.

He is portrayed as a young man who works as a real estate agent and lives in the German city of Wisborg with his wife Ellen Hutter.

The character was based on Jonathan Harker from the gothic horror novel Dracula (1897) by Bram Stoker.

He is played by the actor Gustav von Wangenheim in Nosferatu (1922), by Bruno Ganz (as Jonathan Harker) in Nosferatu the Vampyre (1979), Emrhys Cooper in Nosferatu (2023), and by Nicholas Hoult in Nosferatu (2024). Eddie Izzard plays a fictionalized version of von Wangenheim's portrayal in Shadow of the Vampire (2000).

== Biography ==
Hutter, a real estate agent working for Knock, and his wife live a good life together in (the fictional) Wisborg. One day, Knock tells him to go to the Carpathian Mountains to visit Count Orlok and discuss buying a house. In truth, Orlok has brainwashed Knock, who is now helping his master bring plagues to Wisborg. As Hutter begins to leave, Ellen says goodbye to him. In the mountains, despite warnings from the villagers, and having read the Book of Vampires about the vampire Nosferatu, Orlok's true identity, Hutter dismisses them all and continues his journey.

Once at Castle Orlok, he is greeted by the Count, although he is concerned by the latter's strange behavior whenever there is blood present. The night after completing the purchase process, Orlok reveals his true nature and attempts to drain Hutter's blood. Due to Ellen's psychic connection with her husband, she senses him and walks over the balcony railing while she distracts Orlok, saving Hutter. However, this makes her feel sick and she passes out from it. That morning, Hutter goes to Orlok's crypt and finds the Count sleeping in a coffin. Horrified, he returns to his room and, at night, sees Orlok carrying coffins to go to Wisborg and discovers that the vampire has trapped him in the castle. Concerned for his wife, Hutter attempts to escape through his window using tied sheets but falls to the ground, losing consciousness. He is then nursed back to health by nearby villagers.

Later, Hutter returns home and Ellen is delighted to see him, while Orlok, carrying his own coffin, walks through the house and sees them through the window. Orlok then plans to drain Ellen's blood. Due to Orlok's journey with his rats, Wisborg becomes infected with plagues and several people die in the process, leading the local authorities to declare a quarantine. Knowing that the vampire is responsible, Ellen reads the Book of the Vampire that her husband brought with him to find a way to defeat Orlok, and discovers that the Nosferatu can be defeated if a pure-hearted woman distracts him with beauty.

As a result, Ellen willingly lets Orlok cast a spell on her, causing her to faint. Hutter then goes to ask Professor Bulwer to help his wife. At the same time, Orlok arrives at Hutter's house and drains Ellen's blood, forgetting about time in the process. As the sun rises, Orlok tries to escape, but is caught by the sunlight and evaporates into flames. Then Ellen wakes up and calls Hutter, and he arrives just in time for her to die in his arms.

== Films ==
Thomas Hutter has been played by several actors in different film adaptations.

- Gustav von Wangenheim plays Thomas Hutter in the original Nosferatu (1922). The character is portrayed as a manic man, often grinning wildly with little provocation, somewhat hyperactive, profoundly excitable and very adventurous. While a loving husband to Ellen, he is heedless to her warnings about journeying to a strange land. Nevertheless, he is not oblivious to danger, quickly feeling disturbed in the presence of Orlok.
- Bruno Ganz as Jonathan Harker in Nosferatu the Vampyre (1979). Though Werner Herzog's version reverts to the novel's original names, the 1922 plot structure is retained. One exception is the ultimate fate of the character in the film's climax, inheriting Dracula's vampirism as a result of being bitten by him, while transferable vampirism was not a feature of the original Orlok.
- Eddie Izzard as Gustav von Wangenheim in Shadow of the Vampire (2000). The film is a fictionalized portrayal of the filming of the original Nosferatu, showing von Wangenheim filming scenes as the character Hutter.
- Emrhys Cooper plays Thomas Hutter in Nosferatu (2023), in which Hutter is initially an arrogant, narcissistic and materialistic social climber, cold and indifferent to Ellen's love and even going so far as to cheat on her with a gypsy waitress in Transylvania. Thomas is later consumed with remorse upon escaping Castle Orlok and realising that Orlok is obsessed with his wife. He is determined in his resolution to get back to Wisborg and protect Ellen whom he proclaims his love to as soon as he arrives home. For the rest of the film, he protects her fiercely and is left crushed and heartbroken upon her death.
- Nicholas Hoult is Thomas Hutter in Nosferatu (2024). Like Jonathan Harker in the Stoker novel, he is heavily preoccupied with success and giving his wife the life he believes she deserves. He and Ellen are deeply in love and are shown to have a passionate relationship, although he is often disturbed by her nightmares.

== Differences from Jonathan Harker in the novel ==
- In the original novel Jonathan Harker is attacked by Dracula's three vampire brides while in Transylvania and later Dracula abandons Jonathan at his castle as a meal to these vampire women after leaving for London. In the 1922 film, since Orlok doesn't create other vampires, and exists alone at his castle, he is the one who attacks Thomas Hutter and drinks his blood, then simply abandons him alone at his castle after leaving for Wisborg. In the 2024 film, Hutter instead escapes from Orlok's dogs after a failed attempt at killing him.
- In the 1922 film, Thomas Hutter is a weaker character than Jonathan Harker is in the original novel. Hutter doesn't play any role in killing Orlok, and fails to save his wife Ellen. While in the original novel, Jonathan Harker takes an active part in hunting Dracula, including chasing him back to Transylvania and finally killing him. Jonathan is the one who slits Dracula's throat with a knife, while another character, Quincey Morris, stabs Dracula in the heart. After the death of Dracula, Mina Harker is alive and saved from the vampire curse. In the 2023 film, Hutter takes a more proactive role in the plot, warning Harding that a vampire has come to Wisborg and venturing into Orlok's home to search for him. In the 2024 film, Hutter also takes a more active role in the plot alongside the humans; Von Franz and Ellen instead trick Hutter into killing Knock so that Ellen can sacrifice herself.
