= Jonathan Harker =

Fictional character created by Bram Stoker

- Dracula character
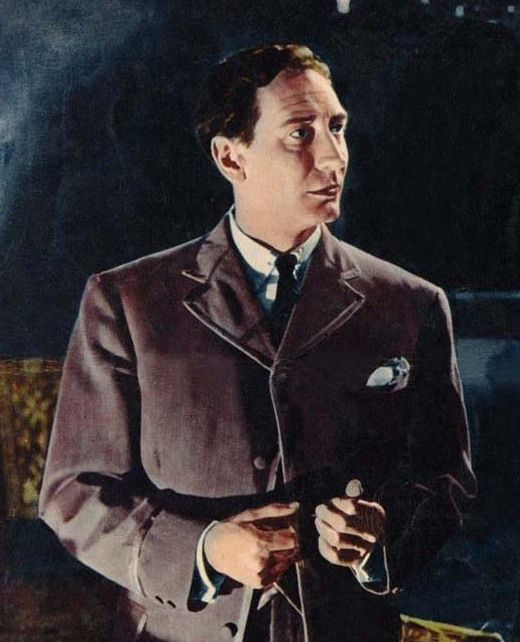
- John Van Eyssen as Harker in the 1958 adaptation of Dracula.
- Created by: Bram Stoker
- Portrayed by: Gustav von Wangenheim (Nosferatu); David Manners (Dracula); Barry Norton (Dracula); John Van Eyssen (Horror of Dracula); Fred Williams (Count Dracula); Murray Brown (Bram Stoker's Dracula); Bosco Hogan (Count Dracula); Trevor Eve (Dracula); Bruno Ganz (Nosferatu the Vampyre); Keanu Reeves (Bram Stoker's Dracula); Steven Weber (Dracula: Dead and Loving It); Rafe Spall (Dracula); Corey Landis (Dracula Reborn); Unax Ugalde (Dracula 3D); Oliver Jackson-Cohen (Dracula); John Heffernan (Dracula)

In-universe information
- Gender: Male
- Occupation: Solicitor
- Spouse: Mina Harker (wife)
- Children: Quincey Harker (son)
- Religion: Anglican
- Nationality: English

Jonathan Harker is a fictional character and one of the main protagonists of Bram Stoker's 1897 Gothic horror novel Dracula. An English solicitor, his journey to Transylvania and encounter with the vampire Count Dracula and his Brides at Castle Dracula constitutes the dramatic opening scenes in the novel and most of the film adaptations.

Stoker appropriated the surname from his friend Joseph Cunningham Harker (1855–1920), a set designer at the Lyceum Theatre in London and father of actor William Gordon Harker (1885–1967) as well as great-grandfather of actress Polly Adams, whose actress-daughters Susannah Harker and Caroline Harker adopted the Harker surname for their stage names.

== In the novel ==
Harker is a recently qualified solicitor from Exeter, who is deputed by his employer, Mr. Hawkins, to act as an estate agent for a foreign client named Count Dracula who wishes to move to London. Harker discovers in Carfax, near Purfleet, Essex, a dwelling which suits the client's requirements and travels to Transylvania by train in order to consult with him about it.

At Bistritz, Harker takes a coach to the Borgo Pass, where at midnight another coach drawn by four black horses, waits to take him to Castle Dracula high in the Carpathian Mountains. At the castle, Harker is greeted by the mysterious and ominous Count Dracula and finalises the property transaction. Soon, however, Harker realises he has been made a prisoner by his host, who is revealed as a vampire. Harker also has a dangerous encounter with the three seductive Brides of Dracula, whose designs on him are only thwarted by the intervention of the Count. He promises to give Harker to them after his business deal is concluded and gives them a "wiggling bag" (presumed by Harker to be a human child) to appease them. Dracula leaves for England and abandons Harker in the castle as a meal for his vampire brides, as he promised them.

Harker manages to escape from the castle alive, before finding refuge at a convent. He suffers a nervous breakdown after his experiences with the vampires; his fiancée, Mina Murray, comes to nurse him back to health with the nuns' help, and marries him there. He returns home to England and later sees Dracula in London. After learning that Dracula has killed Mina's best friend Lucy Westenra, Harker joins Abraham Van Helsing, John Seward, Arthur Holmwood, and Quincey Morris in a quest to kill the vampire, who has bitten Mina. His clerical skills prove very useful for collecting information and tracking down Dracula's London lairs through paperwork.

He vows to destroy Dracula and, if he can, to send "his soul forever and ever to burning to hell[..]!" even if it be at the cost of his own soul. However, as Mina falls deeper under Dracula's thrall, Harker is unsure of what to do. While he promises her that he will put her out of her misery if she falls completely under Dracula's control, in the privacy of his journal he writes that, if she did become a vampire, he would become one himself just so he could continue to be with her. He ultimately saves her by destroying Dracula, however; at the book's climax, he pries open Dracula's coffin and slashes open Dracula's throat with a kukri knife, while Morris stabs him in the heart with a Bowie knife.

In a postscript note set seven years later, it is revealed that Harker and Mina have a son whom they have named after all four members of the party, but whom they call Quincey, after Morris, who sacrificed his life to help them destroy Dracula. Harker eventually visits Dracula's castle along with his wife and son and their surviving friends to reminisce. As Harker returns home with his family, Van Helsing says that one day Harker's son will learn the whole story.

== Portrayals ==
=== On screen ===
Actors portraying Harker include:

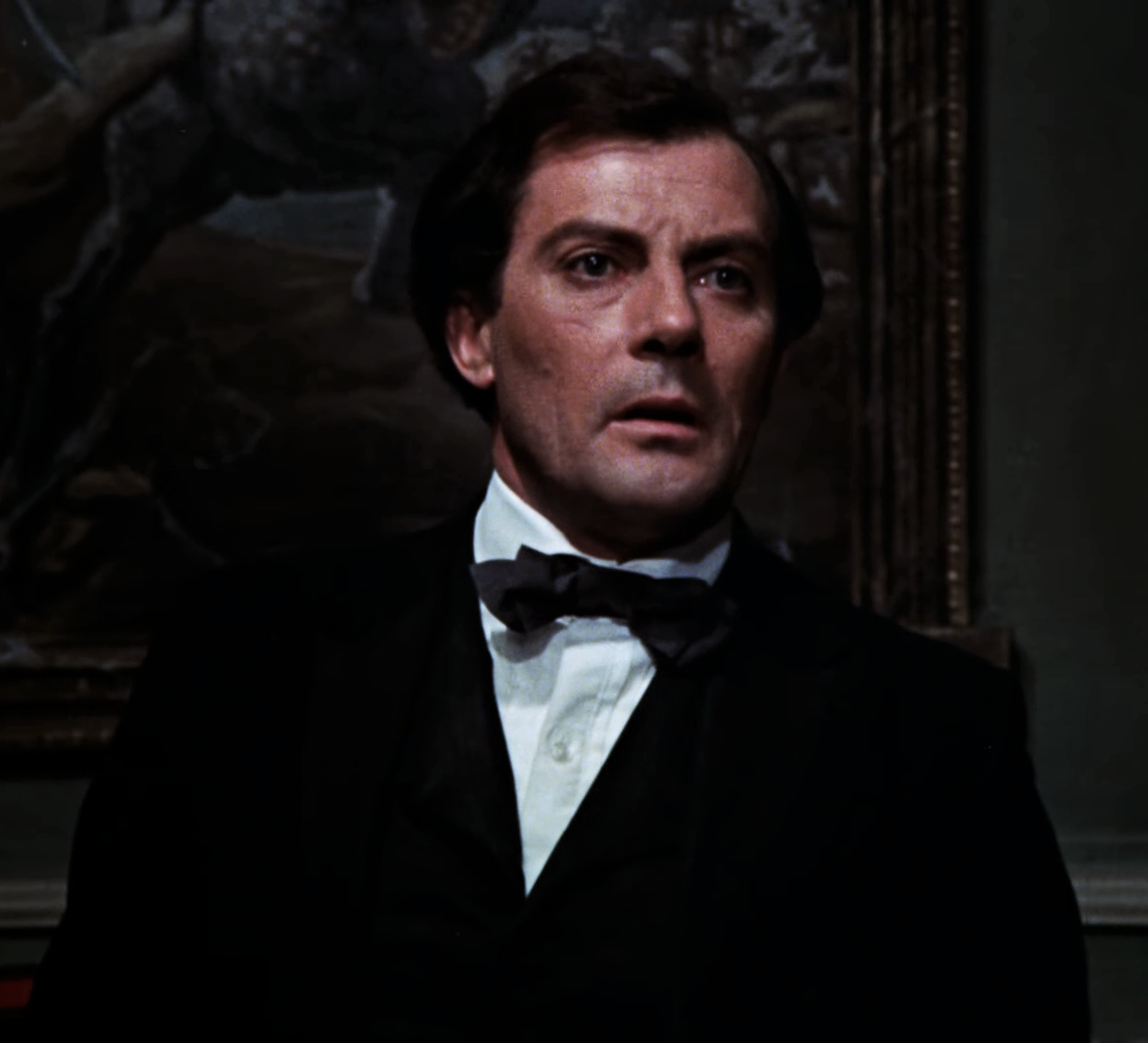
Murray Brown as Harker in Dracula (1973)

- Gustav von Wangenheim (as Thomas Hutter) in Nosferatu (1922) - in this version he fails to kill the vampire and save his wife
- David Manners (as John Harker) in Dracula (1931) - in this version, he never goes to Transylvania (Renfield goes there instead).
- Barry Norton (as Juan Harker) in Dracula (Spanish version, 1931) - in this version, he never goes to Transylvania (Renfield goes there instead).
- Bülent Oran (as Azmi) in Drakula İstanbul'da (1953) - in this version, he single-handedly destroyed Dracula.
- John Van Eyssen in Dracula (1958) - in this version, he is a vampire hunter who is engaged to Lucy and killed by Dracula in his castle and turned into a vampire before being killed by his colleague, Van Helsing.
- Corin Redgrave in Dracula (1968) - in this version, he goes mad after visiting Dracula's castle and transforms into a Renfield-like character, who does Dracula's bidding.
- Fred Williams in Count Dracula (1970) - he is portrayed faithfully to his counterpart in the novel.
- Jan Schánilec in Czechoslovak TV film Hrabě Drakula (1971) - he is portrayed faithfully to his counterpart in the novel.
- Murray Brown in Bram Stoker's Dracula (1974) - in this version, he is killed by Dracula's brides in his castle and turned into a vampire.
- Bosco Hogan in Count Dracula (1977) - he is portrayed faithfully to his counterpart in the novel.
- Bruno Ganz in Nosferatu the Vampyre (1979) - in this version, he is married to Lucy and becomes a vampire at the end of the film.
- Trevor Eve in Dracula (1979) - in this version, he is engaged to Lucy and never goes to Transylvania.
- Keanu Reeves in Bram Stoker's Dracula (1992) - he is portrayed faithfully to his counterpart in the novel.
- Steven Weber in Dracula: Dead and Loving It (1995) - in this version he never goes to Transylvania (Renfield goes there instead).
- Klaha in Bara no Konrei (2001) - in this version his name got changed to Klaha, but he had been portrayed faithfully, however he teams up with another vampire, Közi, played by Közi to defeat the Earl of Dracula, played by Yu~ki.
- Hardy Krüger Jr. in Dracula (2002) - he is re-imagined as modern-day successful American lawyer.
- Johnny A. Wright in Dracula: Pages from a Virgin's Diary (2002)
- Rafe Spall in Dracula (2006) - in this version, he is killed by Dracula in his castle.
- Amouri in Dracula (2008) - an Indian television series on Gemini TV.
- Corey Landis in Dracula Reborn (2012) - in this version he is re-imagined as modern-day American realtor, who sells Dracula property in California. He is killed by his wife Mina, who turned into vampire.
- Unax Ugalde in Dracula 3D (2012) - in this version, he is killed by Dracula and turned into a vampire.
- Oliver Jackson-Cohen in Dracula (television series, 2013) - in this version, he is a gauche journalist who is desperate to climb the ranks of aristocracy.
- John Heffernan in Dracula (television miniseries, 2020) - in this version, he is killed by Dracula and turned into an undead. He manages to escape from the castle into a convent. His undead existence is finished by Dracula after he invites him into the convent. Dracula briefly wears his face as disguise.
- Ryan Woodcock in Dracula: The Original Living Vampire (2022) - in this version, Harker takes in a more Van Helsing-like role, being a chemist who believes in the undead, thinking it can explain some things in the world that science cannot. He has no romantic relationships with Mina or Lucy in this version, but instead he's friend of detective Amelia Van Helsing, helping her in her investigations.
- Emrhys Cooper (as Thomas Hutter) in Nosferatu (2023 film)
- Nicholas Hoult (as Thomas Hutter) in Nosferatu (2024 film)

A few of the adaptions have Harker succumbing to vampirism (either from Dracula or the brides) and having to be killed.
In most adaptations, Harker's role is reduced from that of the novel's hero and the focus (and sympathy) is drawn to other characters, notably Van Helsing or Dracula himself.
While Harker and Mina are the central romance of the novel and Mina shares no other man's affections, she is often portrayed as Dracula's love interest and not as Harker's.
In most adaptations it's usually Van Helsing or some other character, who kills Dracula, while Harker is either already dead by that time, or plays no role (or little role) in killing the vampire.

=== Video games ===
In the PC Games Dracula: Resurrection and Dracula: The Last Sanctuary set after the film Bram Stoker's Dracula, Keanu Reeves's likeness and appearances were used as the base for Jonathan Harker in the games.

=== On stage ===
- In the Frank Wildhorn musical, Dracula, the Musical, Jonathan was played by Darren Ritchie in 2004 Broadway production. In the St. Gallen Switzerland and Graz Austria productions, Jonathan was played by the Swedish musical theater actor, Jesper Tydén.
- In 2006, Franco-Canadian musical Dracula – Entre l'amour et la mort Jonathan was played by Sylvain Cossette.
- In 2011, French musical Dracula – L'amour plus fort que la mort Jonathan was played by Julien Loko.
- In 2019, Northern Ballet's production of Dracula by David Nixon Jonathan was portrayed by Lorenzo Trossello. The production was recorded and showed in UK cinemas on Halloween and then broadcast on BBC4 in 2020.
- In 2026 Robert McCormick played Jonathan in Elara Hearts Dracula with Phoenix Players - Noda praised him highly stating “ Robert McCormick is a very natural actor and put over Harker’s enthusiasm and naivety well. He was nicely matched by Sen Saunders’ spot-on interpretation of his headstrong and bookish fiancée Mina Westerman.”
