= Dracula (miniseries) =

2002 Italian television miniseries

- DVD cover
- Genre: Horror
- Written by: Roger Young; Eric Lerner
- Directed by: Roger Young
- Starring: Patrick Bergin; Giancarlo Giannini; Stefania Rocca; Hardy Krüger Jr.; Kai Wiesinger
- Music by: Harald Kloser; Thomas Wanker
- Country of origin: Italy; Germany
- Original language: English

Production
- Producer: Paolo De Crescenzo
- Cinematography: Elemér Ragályi
- Editor: Alessandro Lucidi
- Running time: 173 minutes
- Production companies: A Lux Video; RaiTrade; Beta Film; Rai Fiction; KirchMedia

Original release
- Release: 29 May 2002 – 2002

Dracula, also known as Dracula's Curse, is a 2002 Italian horror miniseries written and directed by Roger Young and starring Patrick Bergin, Giancarlo Giannini and Stefania Rocca. It is based on the 1897 novel of the same name by Bram Stoker, though it updates the events of the novel to the present day.

== Plot ==
At a ballroom of a hospital charity party in Budapest, the successful American lawyer Jonathan Harker suddenly proposes to his girlfriend Mina. He wants to marry her within the week. Their friends Lucy, Quincy, and Arthur have been invited by Jonathan and have just arrived for the wedding, all without Mina's awareness. Meanwhile, they meet the party's promoter, the psychiatrist Dr. Seward. Later in the same night, Jonathan is called by a rich client, Tepes, who hires him to prepare the inventory of his uncle's wealth, the count Vladislav Tepes, in Romania. In his Porsche, Jonathan travels to the Carpathian Mountains, has an accident, and finally arrives in the count's old castle.

Vlad Tepes, here calling himself Count Vladislav Tepes, decides to leave his castle and move to the west. He says he feels tired from Romania's decline and the seclusion of his life.

In Budapest, he discusses some illegal business with Harker. He also wants Jonathan's help to turn his collection of paintings, jewels, and gold deposits into cash. Jonathan's friends, businessman Quincey Morris, specialising in money swindles, and Arthur Holmwood, a British diplomat in debt, offer to help. Though Jonathan and Arthur doubt the deal, Quincey convinces them that money is all that matters, and it is one true power that makes the world go around.

Dracula gets very interested in those young people—the men, hungry for money and power; Lucy, who wants to sleep in many beds, in many cities, have new experiences and live forever; and Mina, who wants to change the world and end human suffering. Throughout the film, Dracula tries to seduce all five of them into his own world, making them wish to become vampires. Focusing again and again on how hypocritical morality is and promising them the loss of their consciences, he says survival of the fittest is the proper way, and even the strong cannot save the weak. He also references God's slaughters in the Bible to prove that humanity was created in his image, the image of a killer.

There to stop him is the researcher of the occult and Seward's teacher Dr. Enrico Valenzi, who believes that Dracula can be defeated when he faces a strong will empowered by faith. But throughout this film, he raises more and more self-doubts, and his will almost breaks by the end.

Mina, halfway through her transformation to a vampire, manages to make Dracula trust her and kills him as he holds her in an embrace. The film ends with Mina still having the vampire's mark, leaving her fate untold, though it could be that she instead took her own life to prevent herself from succumbing to vampirism entirely.

== Cast ==
- Patrick Bergin as Vladislav Tepes / Count Dracula
- Giancarlo Giannini as Dr. Enrico Valenzi
- Hardy Krüger Jr. as Jonathan Harker
- Stefania Rocca as Mina Murray
- Muriel Baumeister as Lucy Westernra
- Kai Wiesinger as Dr. John Seward
- Alessio Boni as Quincey Morris
- Conrad Hornby as Arthur Holmwood
- Brett Forest as Roenfield
- Alessia Merz as Fair Woman
- Piroska Kiss as Dark Woman
- István Göz as Male Nurse
- Barna Illyés as Border Guard
- Csaba Pethes as Captain of the Tug
- Balázs Tardy as Tug Crew Member 1
- Levente Törköly as Tug Crew Member 2
- Ilona Kassai as Woman at the Hotel
- Imola Gáspár as Woman at the Manor
- Csilla Bakonnyi as Hungarian Woman
- Petra Hauman as Mother of the Boy
- Tibor Kenderesi as Man at the Hotel
- Andrew Divoff as Doctor

== Reception ==
Critical reaction to the film has been mixed to negative. David Johnson of DVD Verdict offered a positive review, saying: "Everyone involved commits to doing an okay job, and the production values and general atmosphere help shed the burden of the film stock and sad-sack effects. Bergin's Dracula is effectively crusty and malicious, and Muriel Baumeister has a good time hamming it up as the infected Lucy." Others were less positive: The SF, Horror, and Fantasy Film Review wrote, "While the film does an excellent job in updating Dracula to the midst of New Europe's nouveau riche, director Roger Young lets the show down considerably in the second half. ... The script does get caught up in some pretentious natterings [and] the performances are particularly uneven."

Noel Megahey of DVD Times said, "It's [the] awkwardness in the script and the dialogue that weighs heavily on the film, although the film actually does operate half-way successfully when it moves into the non-verbal action sequences. What really sinks the film in the end, though, is not the weakness of the special effects, but the performances and the delivery of the pan-European cast that struggles through their semi-dubbed English-language lines." David Hall of EatMyBrains.com said, "There have been far worse cinematic incarnations of Stoker's tale than this — but it must rank as one of the dreariest adaptations ever — a toothless bore shorn of any frisson of eroticism, with nary a drop of blood in sight."

== See also ==
- Vampire film
- List of vampire television series
