= Renfield =

Fictional character from Bram Stoker's Dracula

- Dracula character
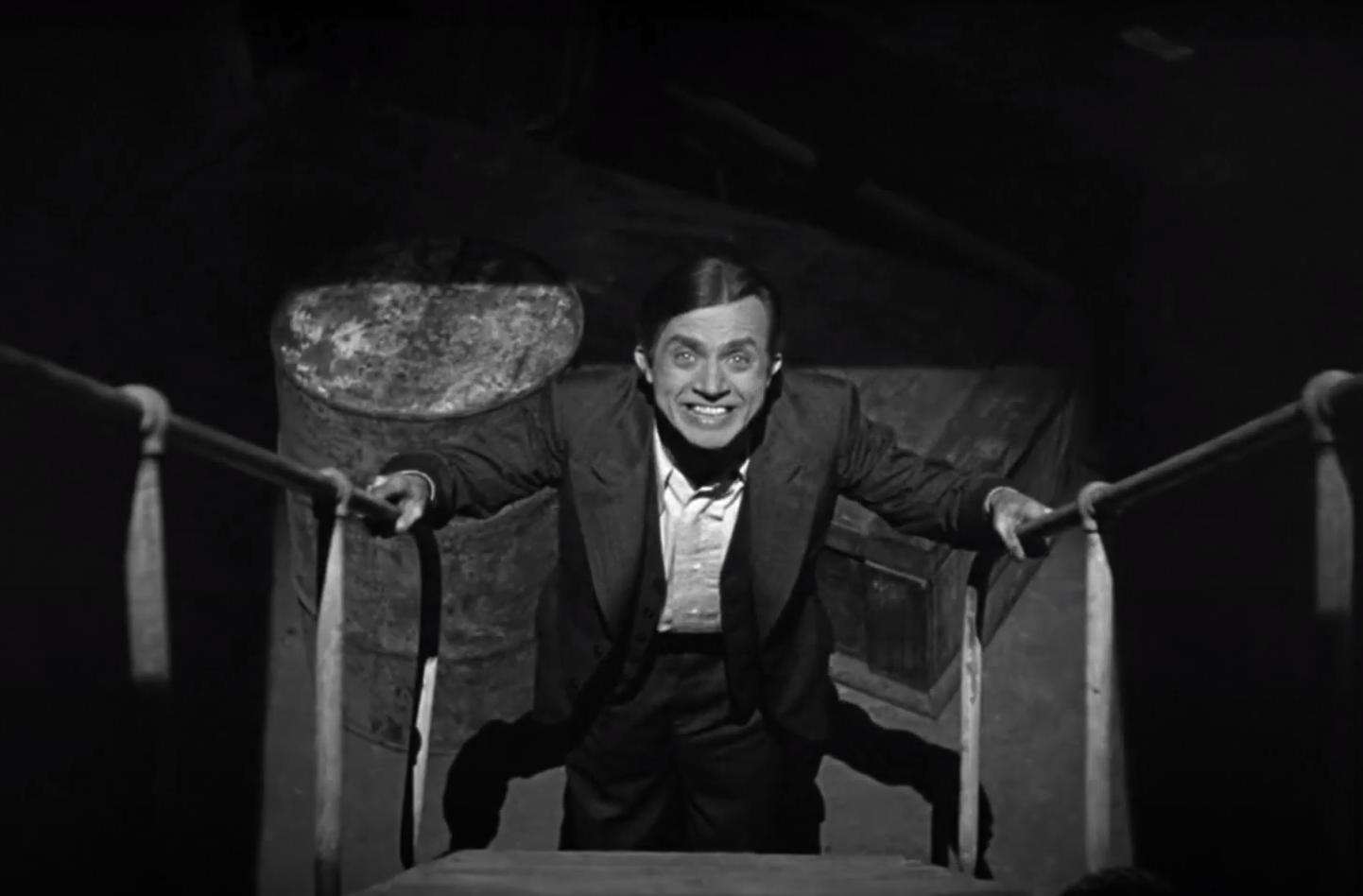
- Screenshot of actor Dwight Frye from the trailer for the film Dracula (1931).
- Created by: Bram Stoker

In-universe information
- Nicknames: The Fly Patient, The Fly Man, The Zoophagous Patient
- Gender: Male
- Nationality: British

R. M. Renfield is a fictional character who appears in Bram Stoker's 1897 Gothic horror novel Dracula. He is Count Dracula's deranged, fanatically devoted servant and familiar, helping him in his plan to turn Mina Harker into a vampire in return for a continuous supply of insects to consume and the promise of immortality. Throughout the novel, he resides in an asylum, where he is treated by Dr. John Seward.

In the various film adaptations of the novel, he has been portrayed by actors such as Alexander Granach, Dwight Frye, Roland Topor, Tom Waits, Peter MacNicol, and Simon McBurney.

== During the novel ==
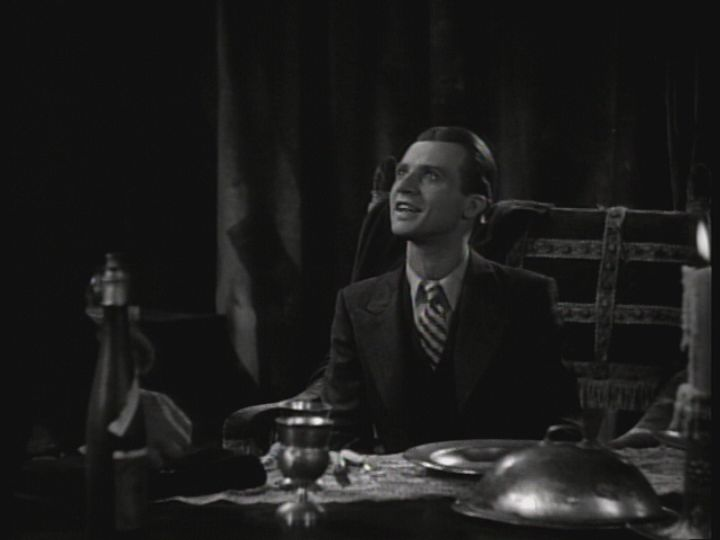
Still from the 1931 film teaser: Dwight Frye as Renfield, in Dracula's castle

A description of Renfield from the novel:

R. M. Renfield, aetat 59. Sanguine temperament, great physical strength, morbidly excitable, periods of gloom, ending in some fixed idea which I cannot make out. I presume that the sanguine temperament itself and the disturbing influence end in a mentally-accomplished finish, a possibly dangerous man, probably dangerous if unselfish. In selfish men, caution is as secure an armour for their foes as for themselves. What I think of on this point is, when self is the fixed point the centripetal force is balanced with the centrifugal. When duty, a cause, etc., is the fixed point, the latter force is paramount, and only accident or a series of accidents can balance it. — From Dr John Seward's journal

Renfield is an inmate at the lunatic asylum overseen by Dr. John Seward. He has delusions which compel him to eat living creatures in the hope of obtaining their life-force for himself. Later Renfield's own testimony reveals that Dracula would send him insects, which he begins consuming. He starts with flies, the death's-head moth, then develops a scheme of feeding the flies to spiders, and the spiders to birds, in order to accumulate more and more life. When denied a cat to accommodate the birds, he eats the birds himself. He also changes his ideas to accommodate Mina Harker by quickly eating all flies and stating that it was an old habit. Seward diagnoses him as a "zoophagous maniac", or carnivorous madman. Later Renfield attacks Seward, acquiring a knife and cutting his arm; as Seward's blood drips from his hand, Renfield licks it off the floor.

During the course of the novel, the role of Renfield as a patient allows the reader to understand his behaviour from the perspective of a psychologist. Through Renfield's demented mind, the reader learns the nature of a vampirism that is eventually revealed to be under the influence of Count Dracula; Renfield attempts to escape from the hospital multiple times to meet him. The vampire, whose abilities include control over animals such as rats, bats and spiders, comes to Renfield with an offer: if Renfield worships him, he promises to make him immortal by providing an endless supply of insects and rats, as Renfield believes that blood is the source of life much like Dracula himself.

However, when confronted by Mina Harker, Dracula's latest victim, Renfield suffers an attack of conscience and begs her to flee from his master's grasp. Consumed by his desire to keep Mina safe, he begs Seward and the others to allow him to leave lest he feel guilty for her fate. When Seward denies his request, Renfield tells the vampire hunters that "[he] warned them!" When Dracula returns that night, Renfield is again seized by his conscience. He remembers hearing that madmen have unnatural strength, and so attempts to fight Dracula. Renfield's strength leaves him after looking into Dracula's eyes, and Dracula throws him to the floor, severely injuring him.

The vampire hunters enter the room shortly afterward, and through an emergency surgery Van Helsing manages to prolong Renfield's life. Renfield tells how he was convinced to invite Dracula in, detailing how Dracula entered the home and went after Mina. They leave him lying on the floor to rescue her. During the party's confrontation against Dracula in Mina's room, they manage to repel him with their crucifixes and wafers of sacramental bread, forcing him to flee the room. However, Dracula flees into other rooms and destroys their records, then back into Renfield's room to break his neck. "When Dr. Van Helsing and Dr. Seward had come back from seeing poor Renfield, we went gravely into what was to be done. First, Dr. Seward told us that when he and Dr Van Helsing had gone down to the room below they had found Renfield lying on the floor, all in a heap. His face was all bruised and crushed in, and the bones of the neck were broken."

== Influence in psychology ==
The character Renfield has influenced the study of real-life behaviour in psychiatric patients with an obsession with drinking blood. The term Renfield syndrome was coined by psychologist Richard Noll in 1992, originally as a joke term, to describe clinical vampirism. Correspondingly, there is also a "vampire personality disorder" (VPD); a diagnosis for clinical vampirism, used for the behavioural profiling of serial killers compelled by bloodlust and for patients who act out violent vampiric fantasies; this diagnosis, however, is not recognized by the Diagnostic and Statistical Manual of Mental Disorders (DSM-5).

The effects of Renfield syndrome follows the pathology of the character in the novel consisting of several stages. Initially the patient exhibits zoophagia, a compulsion to eat insects, or to eat live animals or drink their blood. As the condition worsens, the behaviour grows more and more deviant, culminating in a compulsion to drink another person's blood in an act described as True-Vampirism, including intentionally harming another individual for that purpose—the same behaviour Renfield is seen exhibiting in the novel.

== On screen ==
Renfield on screen
Year	Character name	Film/series title	Actor				
Year	Character name	Film/series title	Actor	1922	Herr Knock	Nosferatu, eine Symphonie des Grauens	Alexander Granach
1931	Renfield	Dracula	Dwight Frye				
1931	Renfield	Dracula	Pablo Álvarez Rubio				
1966	Ludwig	Dracula: Prince of Darkness	Thorley Walters				
1970	Renfield	Nachts, wenn Dracula erwacht	Klaus Kinski				
1977	Renfield	Count Dracula (television film)	Jack Shepherd				
1979	Milo Renfield	Dracula	Tony Haygarth				
1979	Renfield	Nosferatu the Vampyre	Roland Topor				
1979	Renfield	Love at First Bite	Arte Johnson				
1992	R. M. Renfield	Bram Stoker's Dracula	Tom Waits				
1994	Renfield	Nadja	Karl Geary				
1995	Thomas Renfield	Dracula: Dead and Loving It	Peter MacNicol				
2002	Renfield	Dracula (TV miniseries)	Brett Forest				
2005	Renfield	Dracula (TV series)	Manoj Bajpayee				
2006–2014	Percival Renfield	Young Dracula (TV series)	Simon Ludders				
2012	Renfield	Dracula Reborn	Ian Pfister				
2012	Renfield	Dracula 3D	Giovanni Franzoni				
2013	Renfield	Dracula (TV series)	Nonso Anozie				
2014–2016	Renfield	Penny Dreadful (TV series)	Samuel Barnett				
2020	Frank Renfield	Dracula (TV miniseries)	Mark Gatiss				
2022	Renfield/'Mr. Field'	The Invitation	Sean Pertwee				
2023	Robert Montague Renfield	Renfield	Nicholas Hoult				
2024	Knock	Nosferatu	Simon McBurney				

- F. W. Murnau's Nosferatu: A Symphony of Horror (1922 silent film), loosely based on Stoker's novel, renames Renfield (Alexander Granach) as Knock, and combines him with Mr. Hawkins, the employer of the hero Harker (renamed Thomas Hutter).

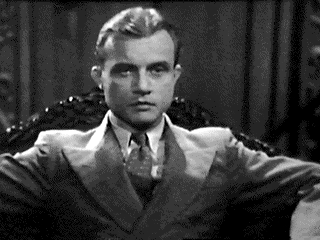
Dwight Frye as Renfield in Dracula (1931)

- In Tod Browning's 1931 film and George Melford's 1931 film, Renfield (played by Dwight Frye in the English version and Pablo Álvarez Rubio in the Spanish version) is the real estate agent who is sent to Transylvania instead of Jonathan Harker, and falls under Dracula's (Bela Lugosi/Carlos Villarías) power. Frye's performance is the best-known and, as noted below, the most imitated, as well as the role he is best remembered for.
- In the 1970 film Count Dracula, Klaus Kinski played Renfield as mute. His link to the Count is explained in terms of his travel to Transylvania once and his horrible experience near Castle Dracula, when his young daughter died.
- The BBC version of Count Dracula (1977), starring Louis Jourdan in the title role, includes Jack Shepherd as a sympathetic Renfield in a prominent role which highlights his relationship with Mina.
- The 1979 film Dracula, starring Frank Langella in the title role, has Tony Haygarth playing Milo Renfield as an unkempt workman who is enthralled by Dracula while he is unloading the boxes at Carfax.
- Another 1979 film, Nosferatu the Vampyre by Werner Herzog, with Klaus Kinski in the main role, features giggling Renfield, the former boss of Jonathan Harker (similarly to the character's background in the 1922 silent film), now a mental asylum patient and a plague spreader, played by Roland Topor.
- Arte Johnson plays Renfield in Love at First Bite (1979), where he is seen being a loyal servant to Dracula in the 1970s as he and his master move to New York. Johnson imitates the Dwight Frye laugh.

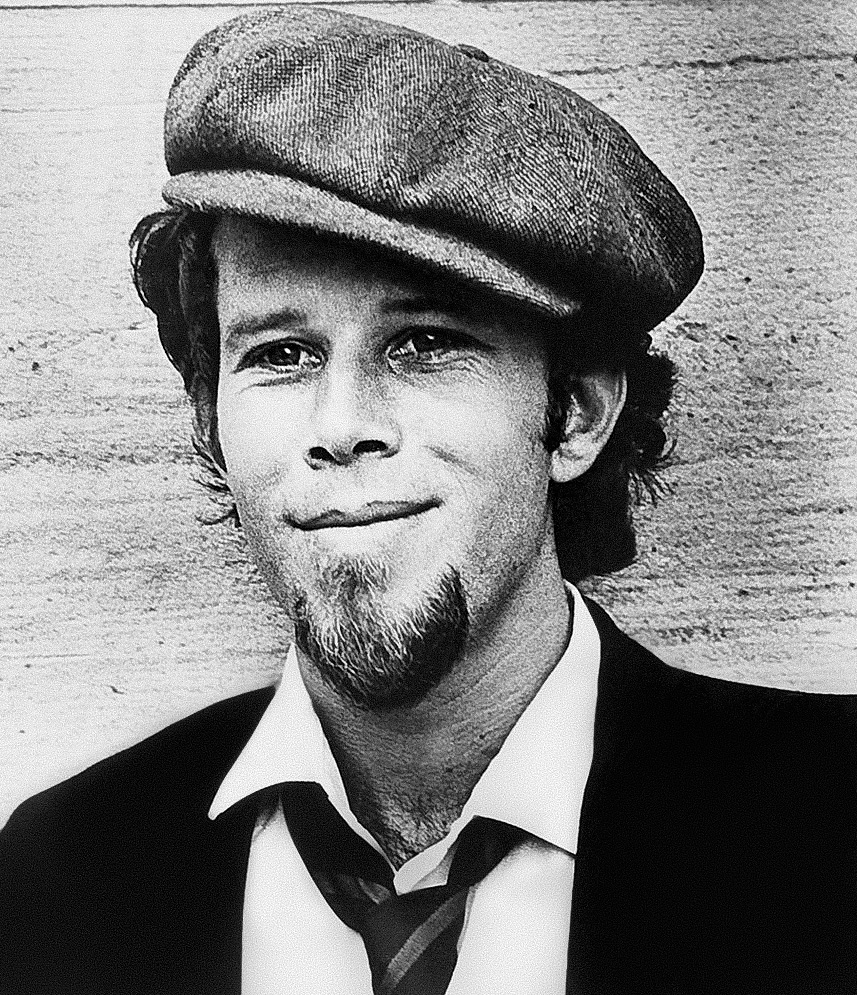
Tom Waits, who played R. M. Renfield in Bram Stoker's Dracula (1992)

- Tom Waits portrays R. M. Renfield in Francis Ford Coppola's 1992 film adaptation Bram Stoker's Dracula. The film suggests that Renfield was Jonathan Harker's predecessor as Count Dracula's agent in London; it is implied that this is the reason for his madness. He tries to persuade Mina to stay out of Dracula's grasp out of jealousy, angry that Dracula plans to give her immortality instead of him.
- Peter MacNicol plays the comedic, simple-minded Thomas Renfield in Mel Brooks' 1995 film Dracula: Dead and Loving It. The role is a parody of Dwight Frye's Renfield from the 1931 film.
- Brett Forest plays Renfield in Dracula (2002), where events of the novel were updated to the modern time period.
- Manoj portrayed Renfield in the 2005 Indian Malayalam-language television series, Dracula, which aired on Asianet.
- Simon Ludders portrays Percival Renfield in Young Dracula (2006–2014), in which the manservant is depicted as an unwashed dimwit with repulsive taste in food (though this aids him in preparing meals for vampires) and prodigious knowledge of science. Renfield is unquestioningly loyal to Dracula in the hope of one day being turned into a vampire, and seems to partly enjoy the abuse Dracula inflicts upon him when he makes mistakes. Renfield ultimately becomes a vampire in the series' concluding episodes, though he proves inept at using his new powers. Ludders also portrays Renfield's father, a cruel man who is resurrected and promptly enacts a plan to destroy the Draculas, but the younger Renfield ultimately undoes his resurrection.
- Ian Pfister plays Renfield in Dracula Reborn (2012). The events take place in modern Los Angeles. Renfield is an associate of Dracula, who moved to California.
- Giovanni Franzoni portrays Renfield in the 2012 film Dracula 3D. Here, he attacks the men attempting to stake Tania (who'd been attacked by Dracula), killing her ex-lover and berating him for leaving her alone the night she was attacked. Later, he comforts Tania (now a vampire) when Dracula is showing interest in Mina. After Van Helsing kills her, Renfield attacks him, referring to Tania as an "angel," before Van Helsing kills him.
- In NBC and Sky Living's 2013 television series, Renfield is portrayed by Nonso Anozie. In contrast to other Renfields, this version is well-educated and fully sane, having been recruited by Dracula to act as his lawyer after Dracula met him on a train, serving as Dracula's confidant and with Dracula expressing complete faith in his loyalty. He is killed by Professor Van Helsing in the final episode when Renfield finds Van Helsing destroying the serum that allows the vampire to walk in the sunlight.
- Samuel Barnett portrays Renfield in the third and final season of the Showtime drama Penny Dreadful (2014–2016).
- Ewan Bailey voices Renfield in the 2017 animated horror comedy Monster Family, where he is Dracula's butler, who ultimately sides with protagonists against his master.
- In the 2020 miniseries Dracula, the character, now named Frank Renfield, is depicted as Count Dracula's lawyer in 21st-century Britain. He is portrayed by Mark Gatiss, who co-wrote the series with Steven Moffat.
- Stuart Packer portrays Renfield in 2022 film titled Dracula: The Original Living Vampire. Here, he is detective Amelia Van Helsing's boss and idol, and he helps her investigate a string of abnormal murders. It is later revealed that Renfield was in fact making a hit list for the killer, who later turns out to be Dracula, who is a powerful vampire. Renfield is shot and killed by Van Helsing, but only to be awakened as a vampire by Dracula, only before he is killed for good.

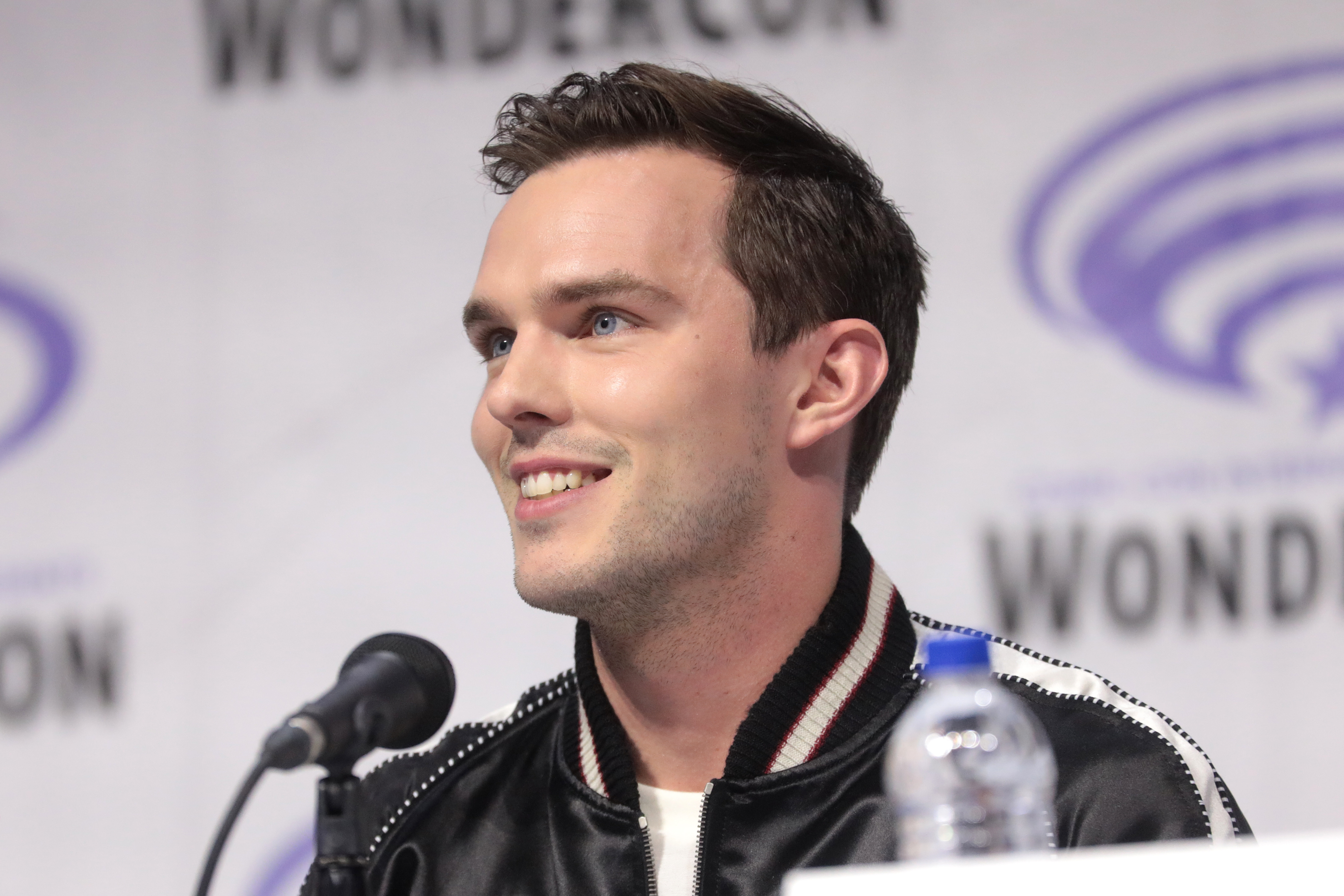
Nicholas Hoult played Robert Montague Renfield in the film Renfield (2023)

- Nicholas Hoult portrays Robert Montague Renfield in the 2023 movie Renfield, taking place in present-day New Orleans, where he has been Dracula's familiar for 90 years and searches for victims to feed him. Renfield joins a self-help group for people in codependent relationships and finds the confidence to leave Dracula's servitude. He and traffic cop Rebecca Quincy ultimately kill Dracula. The movie was based on a pitch from Robert Kirkman. Chris McKay came on board in April 2021 to direct. The script was written by Ryan Ridley.
- Simon McBurney plays Herr Knock, the renamed Renfield, in the 2024 remake of Nosferatu. Once again Thomas Hutter's employer and secretly Orlok's servant, this version is particularly violent and fanatical. He ritually kills and devours the flesh of birds and sheep, and moves on to homicide after escaping custody.

== On stage ==
- Renfield appears in 1924 stage play Dracula by Hamilton Deane. In the play he is killed by Dracula for betraying him. He was played by G. Malcolm Russell and Bernard Jukes in English productions. The play was revised by John. L. Balderston for American audiences in 1927. In the revised version Renfield survives. Bernard Jukes reprised the role on Broadway.
- Renfield appears in Dracula, The Musical by Frank Wildhorn. He has his own song "The Master's Song". He was played by Don Stephenson in Broadway production of the musical.
- Renfield was played by Daniel Boucher in Franco-Canadian 2006 musical Dracula – Entre l'amour et la mort.
- Renfield was portrayed by Kevin Poeung in 2019 Northern Ballet's production of Dracula by David Nixon. The production was recorded and showed in UK cinemas on Halloween and then broadcast on BBC4 in 2020.

== In other media ==
Some paranormal fiction settings like The Dresden Files or Anita Blake: Vampire Hunter use "Renfield" as a generic term for humans enslaved by vampires.

=== Characters based on Renfield ===
- In Drakula İstanbul'da (1953) the character of Renfield does not exist. Instead, Dracula has a servant in his castle, who obeys him. When this servant tries to help Azmi (Jonathan Harker), Dracula kills him.
- In the TV adaptation Dracula (1968) the character of Renfield does not exist. Instead, Jonathan Harker takes up many of his functions: he goes mad after visiting Dracula's castle, ends up in Dr. Seward's asylum and does Dracula's bidding.
- In Vampire in Brooklyn, which loosely follows the plot of the 1924 stage play Dracula, Julius Jones (Kadeem Hardison) is placed under vampire Maximillian's (Eddie Murphy) spell and becomes a zombie-like servant.
- In the Buffy the Vampire Slayer episode "Buffy vs. Dracula" (2000), Xander Harris falls under the spell of Dracula, begins devouring insects and spiders for much of the episode, calls Dracula "Master" and obeys his orders.
- Although he is not present in Van Helsing (2004), Igor takes up the mantle of Dracula's servant, ready to do his bidding.
- While not in the 2014 film Dracula Untold, a Roma man portrayed by Zach McGowan does refer to the titular character as "Master", much like Renfield addresses Count Dracula. If a sequel had happened, McGowan would have returned, portraying Renfield.
- In the 2016 short film The Phantom Hour, the character Bryce, portrayed by Brian Patrick Butler, is a vampire's right-hand man who was compared to Renfield.
