= Dracula (1979 film) =

1979 British horror film directed by John Badham

- Theatrical release poster
- Directed by: John Badham
- Screenplay by: W. D. Richter
- Based on: Dracula (1897 novel) by Bram Stoker; Dracula (1924 play) by Hamilton Deane and John L. Balderston
- Produced by: Marvin Mirisch; Walter Mirisch
- Starring: Frank Langella; Laurence Olivier; Donald Pleasence; Kate Nelligan
- Cinematography: Gilbert Taylor
- Edited by: John Bloom
- Music by: John Williams
- Production company: The Mirisch Company
- Distributed by: Universal Pictures
- Release date: July 13, 1979
- Running time: 109 minutes
- Countries: United Kingdom; United States
- Language: English
- Budget: $12.2 million
- Box office: $31.2 million

Dracula is a 1979 gothic horror film directed by John Badham. The film stars Frank Langella in the title role as well as Laurence Olivier, Donald Pleasence and Kate Nelligan.

The film is based on Bram Stoker's 1897 novel Dracula and its 1924 stage adaptation, though much of Stoker's original plot was revised to make the film more romantic, as advertised by the tagline "A Love Story". The film received mostly positive reviews and was a moderate box office success. It won the 1979 Saturn Award for Best Horror Film.

== Plot ==
In Whitby, Yorkshire, in 1913, Count Dracula arrives from Transylvania via the ship Demeter one stormy night. Mina Van Helsing, who is visiting her friend, Lucy Seward, discovers Dracula's body after his ship has run aground and rescues him. The Count visits Mina and her friends at the household of Lucy's father, Dr. Jack Seward, whose clifftop mansion also serves as the local asylum. At dinner, he proves to be a charming guest and leaves a strong impression on the hosts, especially Lucy. Less charmed by this handsome count is Jonathan Harker, Lucy's fiancé.

Later that night, while Lucy and Jonathan are having a secret rendezvous, Dracula reveals his true nature as he descends upon Mina to drink her blood. The following morning, Lucy finds Mina awake in bed, struggling for breath. Powerless, she watches her friend die, only to find wounds on her throat. Lucy blames herself for Mina's death, as she had left her alone.

At a loss for the cause of death, Dr. Seward calls in Mina's father, Professor Abraham Van Helsing, who suspects what might have killed his daughter; a vampire. He begins to worry about what fate his seemingly dead daughter may now have. Seward and Van Helsing investigate their suspicions and discover a roughly clawed opening within Mina's coffin, leading them to the local mines. It is there that they encounter the ghastly form of an undead Mina and it is up to a distraught Van Helsing to destroy what remains of his daughter.

Lucy has in the meantime been summoned to Carfax Abbey, Dracula's new home. She reveals herself to be in love with this foreign prince and openly offers herself to him as his bride. After a surreal "wedding night" sequence, Lucy, like Mina before her, is now infected by Dracula's blood. The two doctors manage to give Lucy a blood transfusion to slow her descent into vampirism, but she remains infected under Dracula's spell.

Now aided by Jonathan, the doctors realize that the only way to save Lucy is by destroying Dracula. They manage to locate his coffin within the grounds of Carfax Abbey, but the vampire is waiting for them. Despite it being daylight, Dracula is still a very powerful adversary. Dracula escapes their attempts to kill him, bursts into the asylum to free the captive Lucy and also scolds his slave, Milo Renfield, for warning the others about him. Renfield apologizes and pleads for his life, but Dracula kills him by breaking his neck. Dracula makes preparations to return to Transylvania with Lucy.

Harker and Van Helsing board the ship carrying Dracula and Lucy as cargo bound for Transylvania. Below decks, Harker and Van Helsing find Dracula and Lucy sleeping in a coffin. Van Helsing attempts to stake Dracula, but Lucy protests, waking Dracula. In the struggle, Van Helsing is fatally wounded by Dracula, as he is impaled with the stake intended for the vampire. Dracula now concentrates his attention on Harker. Van Helsing uses his remaining strength to throw a hook attached to a rope, tied to the ship's rigging, into Dracula's back. Harker seizes his chance and hoists the count up through the cargo hold to the top of the ship's rigging, where he apparently dies a painful death when the rays of the sun burn his body.

Van Helsing dies from his wounds. Lucy is now apparently herself again. Lucy smiles enigmatically as she notices Dracula's cape blow away into the horizon, hinting that Dracula may have survived.

== Cast ==
- Frank Langella as Count Dracula
- Laurence Olivier as Professor Abraham Van Helsing
- Donald Pleasence as Dr. Jack Seward
- Kate Nelligan as Lucy Seward
- Trevor Eve as Jonathan Harker
- Tony Haygarth as Milo Renfield
- Jan Francis as Mina Van Helsing
- Sylvester McCoy as Walter
- Janine Duvitski as Annie
- Teddy Turner as Swales

== Production ==
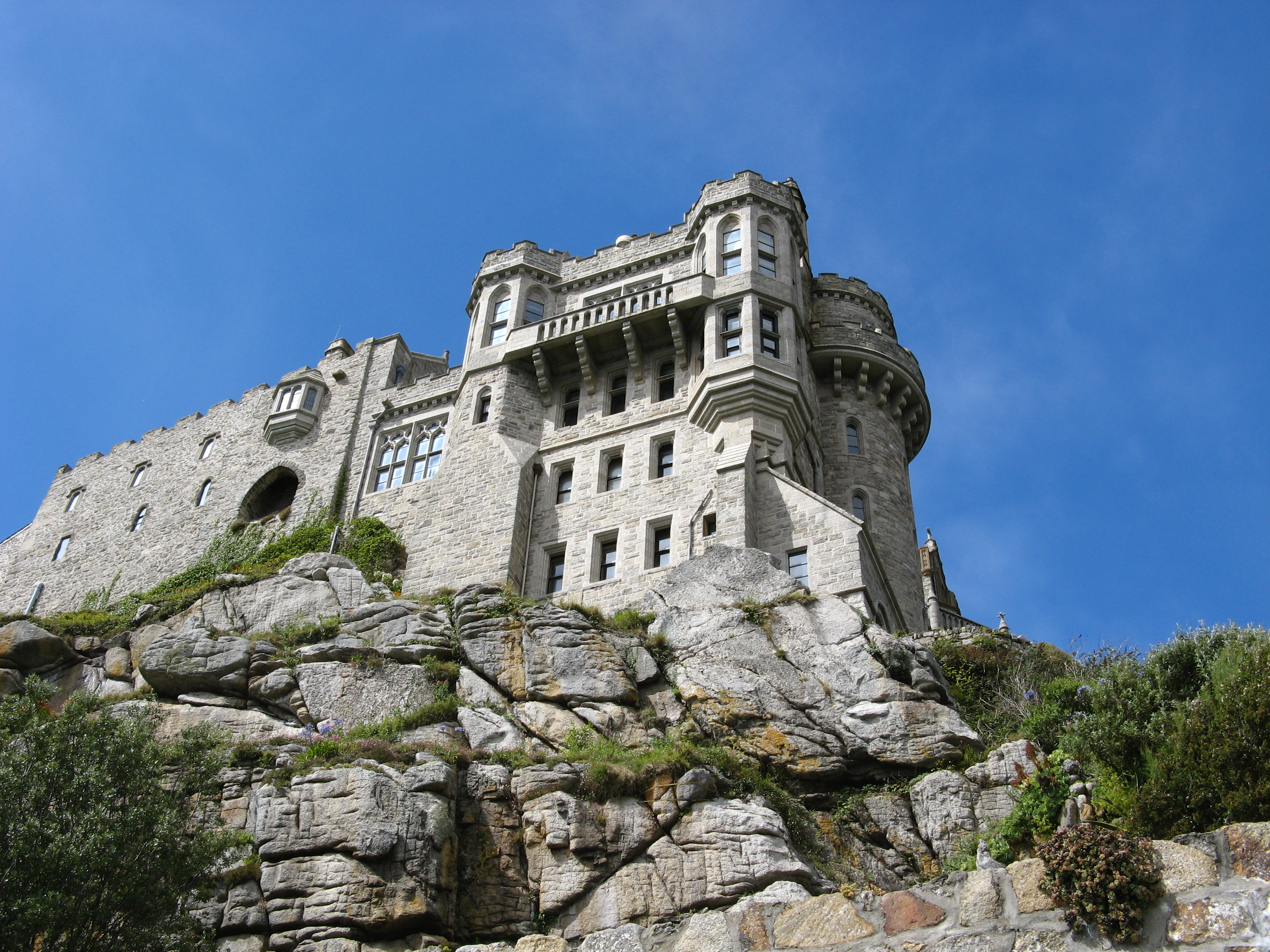
The chapel of St Michael, used as the location of Carfax Abbey in the film

Like Universal's earlier 1931 version starring Bela Lugosi, the screenplay for this adaptation of Bram Stoker's novel Dracula is based on the stage adaptation by Hamilton Deane and John L. Balderston, which ran on Broadway and also starred Langella in a performance for which he was nominated for the Tony Award for Best Actor in a Play at the 32nd Tony Awards. Set in the Edwardian period, and strikingly designed by Edward Gorey, the play ran for over 900 performances between October 1977 and January 1980. Langella also appeared in the play for a limited run in the West End. The play is also known for switching the names of the characters of Mina Harker and Lucy Westenra. When John Badham was asked why he had also switched their names in his film, he said that he could not quite remember but that maybe he and W. D. Richter "felt like Mina was a dopey name and that Lucy was kind of a nice name".

The film was shot on location in England, at Shepperton Studios and Black Park, Buckinghamshire. Locations in Cornwall doubled for the majority of the exterior Whitby scenes; Tintagel for Dr. Jack Seward (Donald Pleasence)'s asylum, and St Michael's Mount for Carfax Abbey. The Castle Dracula was a glass matte painted by Albert Whitlock. Gilbert Taylor was the cinematographer, and the original music score was contributed by John Williams.

According to Frank Langella, Count Dracula was "a dominant, aggressive force. He must have Miss Lucy or he dies. He wants what he wants and he doesn't analyze it. Dracula as a character is very erotic. ... A woman can be totally passive with Dracula: 'he made me drink, I couldn't help it.' ... Dracula seems to represent a kind of doorway to sexual abandonment not possible with a mere mortal. Besides, he's offering immortality. Actually, I can't think of a woman who wouldn't like to be taken if it's with love. If you take a woman by force and at the same time gently, you can't fail."

Langella wanted to explore sides of the character which were not shown before: "I decided he was a highly vulnerable and erotic man, not cool and detached and with no sense of humour or humanity. I didn't want him to appear stilted, stentorian or authoritarian as he's often presented. I wanted to show a man who, while evil, was lonely and could fall in love".

Langella held this view many years after the release of the movie. In his 2017 interview during Sitges Film Festival he said that he "saw a gentleman in [Dracula], while the bad guys were the ones who wanted to destroy him, and we see that today in many instances: ignorance leads to the desire to destroy different people, there is the suffering of homosexuals, or women." Langella remembers that the beginning of shooting was very disorganized. The cinematographer was changed and they had continual changes of plans. However, the actor said that the process "turned out well" in the end.

However, Langella's most vivid memories were his efforts to create a different Dracula. "I did not want to look like Bela Lugosi, or Christopher Lee", remembers Langella. He thus read the novel and found the character to be "gothic, elegant, lonely, without anyone who understood his problem, which consisted of the need for blood to survive." Langella also understood that the attraction that the character produced among women was key to realize his enormous "power of seduction", which Langella did not hesitate to use.

Badham hired composer John Williams to write the musical score for the film. Williams was originally set to score Ronald Neame's sci-fi disaster Meteor, but numerous production delays forced Williams to step back from the project, freeing him to work with Badham. Williams recorded the score with the renowned London Symphony Orchestra in the spring of 1979. The original soundtrack album was released by MCA Records, followed by a Deluxe Edition encompassing the complete score by Varèse Sarabande in 2018.

== Reception ==
=== Box office ===
In 1979, at least three Dracula films were released around the world: this film, West German director Werner Herzog's retelling as Nosferatu the Vampyre, and the comedy Love at First Bite. The success of the jokey Love at First Bite, starring George Hamilton, may have been relevant to the muted response this version experienced. The film opened at number one at the US box office with an opening weekend gross of $3,141,281 nationally from 455 theaters but performed modestly at the box office, grossing $20,158,970 domestically, and was seen as something of a disappointment by the studio.

=== Critical response ===
Roger Ebert of the Chicago Sun-Times, gave the film 3½ stars out of 4, writing: "What an elegantly seen Dracula this is, all shadows and blood and vapors and Frank Langella stalking through with the grace of a cat. The film is a triumph of performance, art direction and mood over materials that can lend themselves so easily to self-satire...This Dracula restores the character to the purity of its first film appearances..." Janet Maslin of The New York Times, stated: "In making this latest trip to the screen in living color, Dracula has lost some blood. The movie version ... is by no means lacking in stylishness; if anything, it's got style to spare. But so many of its sequences are at fever pitch, and the mood varies so drastically from episode to episode, that the pace becomes pointless, even taxing, after a while." Film historian Leonard Maltin gave the film 1.5 out of a possible 4 stars, describing it as "Murky...with Langella's acclaimed Broadway interpretation sabotaged by trendy horror gimmicks and ill-conceived changes to Bram Stoker's novel."

On the review aggregator website Rotten Tomatoes, 62% of 98 critics' reviews are positive, with an average rating of 6.3/10. The website's consensus reads: "Despite an occasionally imbalanced mix of romance and overly grotesque scares, Dracula offers chilling atmosphere in spades and a seductively enigmatic turn from Frank Langella as the legendary vampire."

== Accolades ==
Year	Award / Film Festival	Category	Recipient(s)	Result
1979	9th Paris International Festival of Fantastic and Science-Fiction Film	Golden Licorn (Best Film)	Dracula	Won
1979	Saturn Awards	Best Horror Film	Dracula	Won
1979	Saturn Awards	Best Actor	Frank Langella	Nominated
1979	Saturn Awards	Best Supporting Actor	Donald Pleasence	Nominated
1979	Saturn Awards	Best Director	John Badham	Nominated
1979	Saturn Awards	Best Make-up	Peter Robb-King	Nominated

== Home media ==
The movie made it onto Variety's All-Time Horror Rentals in 1993, but it fell into relative cinematic obscurity for several years, partly due to it having a very limited video release outside of the US.

=== Video recoloring ===
The 1979 theatrical version looks noticeably different from later prints. When the film was reissued for a widescreen laserdisc release in 1991, the director chose to alter the color timing, desaturating the look of the film.

John Badham had intended to shoot the film in black and white (to mirror the monochrome 1931 film and the stark feel of the Gorey stage production), but Universal Studios executives objected. Cinematographer Gilbert Taylor was prompted to shoot the movie in warm, "golden" colors, to show off the distinctive production design. The original version has not been widely screened since the 1980s.

In 2018, a 2.35:1 aspect ratio fan edit restored the theatrical color timing based on the original laserdisc and VHS releases, as well as set photography and reference materials prompting an official release the following year.

In July, 2019 Shout! Factory announced a re-release of the film on Blu-ray. It was released with the desaturated "Director's Edition" on disc one and the original "Theatrical Version" on disc two.

In November 2020, Black Hill Pictures and KOCH Media released a newly restored "cinema edition" featuring the 1979 color version of Dracula on Blu-ray (Region B/2), making use of higher quality source materials.

== See also ==
- Vampire films
- Dracula (Universal film series), Universal Pictures' original Dracula films
