= Hardy Krüger Jr. =

German actor (born 1968)

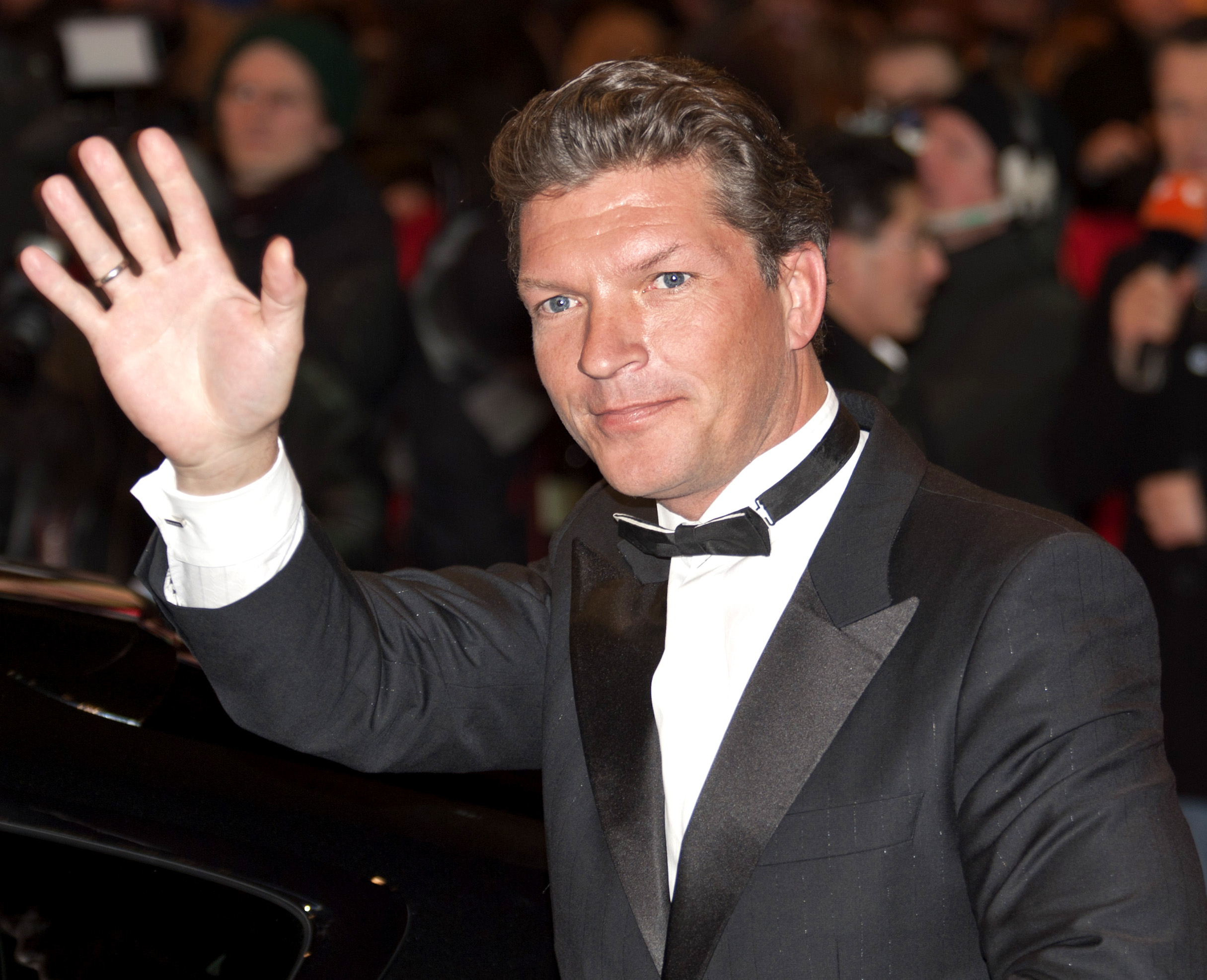
Krüger at the Berlin Film Festival 2011

Hardy Krüger Jr. (born 9 May 1968) is a German actor. He is the son of the German actor-writer Hardy Krüger and the Italian painter Francesca Marazzi.

== Life ==
Krüger was born in Lugano, Switzerland. Shortly after his birth, his father took his wife and son to Tanzania to live on the farm which had served as the backdrop for the film Hatari!, in which Krüger senior had appeared. The younger Krüger attended an international school in Germany and then, after training as a bartender, in 1989 he took acting classes in Los Angeles and acted in US television shows. In an interview in Volle Kanne (ZDF) Hardy Krüger Jr. stated he had also completed training as a chef. After graduating in 1991 he began his career in Germany with an appearance in the ARD series Nicht von schlechten Eltern and with the lead role in Gegen den Wind. He has since appeared in several international productions such as Le Cocu magnifique (France, 1999), Asterix and Obelix vs Caesar (France, 1999) and Roger Young's Dracula. He also took a lead role in the 2004 Stauffenberg, which was awarded the Deutscher Fernsehpreis for Best Film. In May 2006 he first appeared as the replacement for Christian Wolff in ZDF's Forsthaus Falkenau, in which he played the lead role of the forester Stefan Leitner.

Krüger is a UNICEF ambassador against child prostitution, a role for which he was rewarded by Kinderlachen with the "Kind-Award 2006". He has also become a patron of the charity "TukTuk-Tour" from Asia to Europe. He also accompanied Bundesminister Sigmar Gabriel on the creation of the Naturallianz by the CBD-COP9. His first marriage produced two sons and ended in divorce. In 2009 he remarried to Austrian communications trainer and painter Katrin Fehringer, with whom he lived in Starnberg near Munich and with whom he adopted a girl from Thailand in 2009. They had two children (a son died in a crib accident). They divorced in 2015.

== Selective filmography ==
- 1992–1996: Nicht von schlechten Eltern (TV series, 25 episodes), as Pascal Neumann
- 1995–1999: Gegen den Wind (TV series, 51 episodes), as Sven Westermann
- 1999: Michael Strogoff (TV film), as Ivan Ogareff
- 1999: Le Cocu magnifique (TV film), as Petrus
- 1999: Asterix & Obelix Take On Caesar, as Tragicomix
- 1999: Contaminated Man, as Plant Manager
- 2001: The Dreaming (TV film), as Eric Westbrook
- 2001: Bel Ami – Liebling der Frauen (TV film), as Julius De Rooy
- 2002: Vortex, as Vincent
- 2002: The Sisters' House (TV film), as Peter
- 2002: Dracula (TV film), as Jonathan Harker
- 2003: Nancy & Frank – A Manhattan Love Story, as Frank Wagner
- 2003: Je reste!, as John
- 2004: Stauffenberg, as Werner von Haeften
- 2005: The Chocolate Queen (TV film), as Michael Bender
- 2006: Plötzlich Opa
- 2006–2013: Forsthaus Falkenau, lead role as forester Stefan Leitner
- 2009: Lilly Schönhauer – Paulas Traum
- 2010: Who Dares to Love
- 2011: Serengeti
- 2012: Inga Lindström – Vier Frauen und die Liebe
- 2013: Das Traumhotel – Myanmar
- 2013: SOKO Stuttgart

(tv-serie, one episode)

- 2013: Nur mit euch!
- 2014: SOKO München (tv-serie, one epidode)
- 2015–2018: Notruf Hafenkante (tv-serie, 11 episodes)
- 2017: Das Traumschiff: Tansania
- 2019: Eine ganz heiße Nummer 2.0
- 2021: Leberhaken
- 2022: Fritzie – Der Himmel muss warten (tv-serie, 2 episodes)
- 2022: Let's Dance (German TV series)
- 2023: Rote Rosen (tv-serie, 152 episodes)
- 2023: Simon Becketts Die Chemie des Todes (tv-serie, 4 episodes)
- 2024: Gute Zeiten, schlechte Zeiten (tv-serie, 89 episodes)
- 2025: Inga Lindström: Das Flüstern der Pferde
- 2026: Ich bin ein Star – Holt mich hier raus! (RTL, partipiciant)
