= John Seward =

Fictional character appearing in Bram Stoker's Dracula

- Dracula character
- Art by Pablo Marcos
- First appearance: Dracula
- Created by: Bram Stoker

In-universe information
- Aliases: Dr. John Seward; Dr. Seward
- Species: Human
- Gender: Male
- Title: Doctor of Medicine
- Occupation: Doctor
- Spouse: Wife (unnamed)
- Nationality: British

John "Jack" Seward, M.D. is a fictional character appearing in Bram Stoker's 1897 novel Dracula.

== In the novel ==
Seward is the administrator of an insane asylum not far from Count Dracula's first English home, Carfax. Throughout the novel, Seward conducts ambitious interviews with one of his patients, R. M. Renfield, in order to understand better the nature of life-consuming psychosis, or as he calls it, zoophagy. As a psychiatrist, Seward enjoys using the most up-to-date equipment, including using a recording phonograph to record his interviews with his patients and his own notes. Several chapters of the novel consist of transcriptions of Seward's phonograph recordings. One of the main contributions made by Dr. Seward is his recordings of the events depicted from his personal perspective as a doctor; allowing the reader to gain a scientific understanding of the behaviour of vampirism through his behavioural analysis of Renfield.

He is best friends with Quincey Morris and Arthur Holmwood. All three propose to Lucy Westenra on the same day. Although Lucy turns down Seward's marriage proposal, his love for her remains, and he dedicates himself to her care when she is suddenly taken ill.

He calls in his mentor, Abraham Van Helsing, to help him with her illness, and he helps Seward to realise that Lucy has been bitten by a vampire and is doomed to become one herself. After she is officially destroyed and her soul can go to heaven, Seward is determined to destroy Dracula. The novel's epilogue mentions that Seward is now happily married.

== In adaptations ==
=== On screen ===
Seward often appears in different screen adaptations of Dracula but in a wide variety of different roles. He is often referred to as "Jack" Seward. The most common change is to portray him not as Lucy's suitor, but as Mina Harker's father (or sometimes Lucy's father). This was almost certainly based on the Hamilton Deane–John L. Balderston stage adaptation. Sometimes he is portrayed as just a doctor with no familial or romantic connections to other characters. Such portrayals include:

- Gustav Botz (as Dr. Sievers) in Nosferatu (1922)
- Herbert Bunston in Dracula (1931 film) – here he is father of Mina
- José Soriano Viosca in Drácula (Spanish version, 1931) – here he is father of Eva (Mina in this version)
- Münir Ceyhan (as Dr.Akif) in Drakula İstanbul'da (1953)
- Charles Lloyd-Pack in Dracula (1958)
- Paul Muller in Count Dracula (1970)
- Václav Mareš in Hrabe Drakula (1971)
- Donald Pleasence in Dracula (1979) – here he is father of Lucy.
- Harvey Korman in Dracula: Dead and Loving It (1995) – here he is father of Mina.
- Dani Lennon (as Dr. Joan Seward) in Dracula Reborn (2012) – here she is doctor in modern-day California, who treats Lina Harker after she gets strange blood condition.
- Michael Ironside in Dracula the Original Living Vampire (2022) – here he's coroner, who helps detective Van Helsing in her investigation of abnormal murders.
- Ralph Ineson as Dr. Wilhelm Sievers in Nosferatu (2024), a remake of the 1922 film of the same name.

In recent years, the trend has been to return Seward to his role in the novel, as a suitor for Lucy's hand in marriage, in:

- James Maxwell in Dracula (1968) – here he is Lucy's fiancé. He and Van Helsing team up and jointly defeat Dracula.
- Mark Burns in Count Dracula (1977) – he is portrayed faithfully to his counterpart in the novel.
- Richard E. Grant in Bram Stoker's Dracula (1992) – he is portrayed faithfully to his counterpart in the novel.
- Matthew Johnson in Dracula: Pages from a Virgin's Diary (2002)
- Ibrahim Kutty in Dracula (2005) – an Indian Malayalam-language television series which aired on Asianet.
- Prasad in Dracula (2008) – an Indian Telugu-language television series which aired on Gemini TV.
- Tom Burke in Dracula (2006). Here, he's had an unrequited crush on Lucy since he was twelve. At the end of the film, he and Mina get together.
- Matthew Beard in Dracula (2020) – he is re-imagined as modern-day medical student, who has an unrequited crush on Lucy.

=== On stage ===
- John Seward appears in Dracula, the musical by Frank Wildhorn. He was played by Shonn Wiley in Broadway production of the musical.
- Dr. Seward was portrayed by Joseph Taylor in 2019 Northern Ballet's production of Dracula by David Nixon. The production was recorded and showed in UK cinemas on Halloween and then broadcast on BBC4 in 2020.
- John Seward is one of the principal characters in a stage adaptation of Dracula by John Godber and Jane Thornton, first performed by Hull Truck Theatre Company in 1995. He was played by Paul Gilmore.
- Dr Arthur Seward was portrayed by JP Stockwell in The Phoenix Players 2026 theatre production of Dracula adapted for the stage by Liz Lochhead & directed by Elara Heart depicting Seward as both the Dr to Shred Malice’s Renfield and the Fiancé of Caitlin Green’s Lucy Westerman

=== Radio ===
In the 1938 Mercury Theatre on the Air radio production of Dracula, Seward's character was combined with Arthur Holmwood's and renamed Arthur Seward. He was voiced by Orson Welles, who also voiced Dracula in the adaptation.

== In other media ==
- In the alternate history novel Anno Dracula (1992), where Van Helsing fails and Dracula becomes the ruler of Britain, Seward becomes the murderer well known as "Jack the Ripper", whose targets are vampire prostitutes who remind him of Lucy (Seward is actually indirectly responsible for this new timeline; an injury he sustained to his hand in a confrontation with Renfield means that Seward hesitates when they discover Dracula attacking Mina, resulting in Dracula killing Jonathan Harker and Quincey Morris before escaping with Mina). Seward is finally killed after suffering a complete mental breakdown.
- In novel Dracula the Un-Dead (2009), a sequel to Dracula, Seward has become a morphine addict obsessed with killing the undead.
- In the 2011 Young Dracula TV series episode "Therapy", the character is a woman, Joan Seward, portrayed by Thusitha Jayasundera.
- In season 3 of TV series Penny Dreadful, which combines elements from several works of Victorian literature, Patti LuPone portrays Dr. Florence Seward, a female version of the character.
- The animated comedy series You're Not a Monster, features Jack Seward, voiced by Kelsey Grammer who is depicted as having been turned into a vampire and helps his great-great-grandson Max, voiced by Eric Stonestreet.
- In the 1997 Manga Hellsing, John Seward is shown during a flashback of Alucard's defeat as Count Dracula.
