= Arthur Holmwood =

Character in Bram Stoker's novel Dracula

- Dracula character
- Art by Pablo Marcos
- First appearance: Dracula
- Created by: Bram Stoker

In-universe information
- Alias: esquire
- Species: Human
- Gender: Male
- Title: Arthur
- Spouses: Lucy Westenra; Unnamed second wife
- Relatives: Lord Godalming (father, deceased)
- Nationality: English

Arthur "Art" Holmwood (later Lord Godalming) is a fictional character in Bram Stoker's 1897 novel Dracula.

== In the novel ==
Holmwood is engaged to Lucy Westenra, and is best friends with the other two men who proposed to her on the very same day, Quincey Morris and Doctor John Seward. Holmwood is the one who drives a wooden stake into Lucy after she becomes a vampire and helps hunt Count Dracula. He is the only son of Lord Godalming. When his father dies about halfway through the novel, Arthur inherits his title. It is through his wealth and fortune that the team are able to be funded in their operation of vanquishing Dracula. He has been depicted aiding the other protagonists of the novel in raiding Dracula's many lairs throughout London as well as aiding in the investigation of locating Dracula's many purchased estates. It is mentioned in the note at the end of the novel, written seven years after Dracula's death, that Holmwood is now happily married.

== In other media ==
=== On screen ===
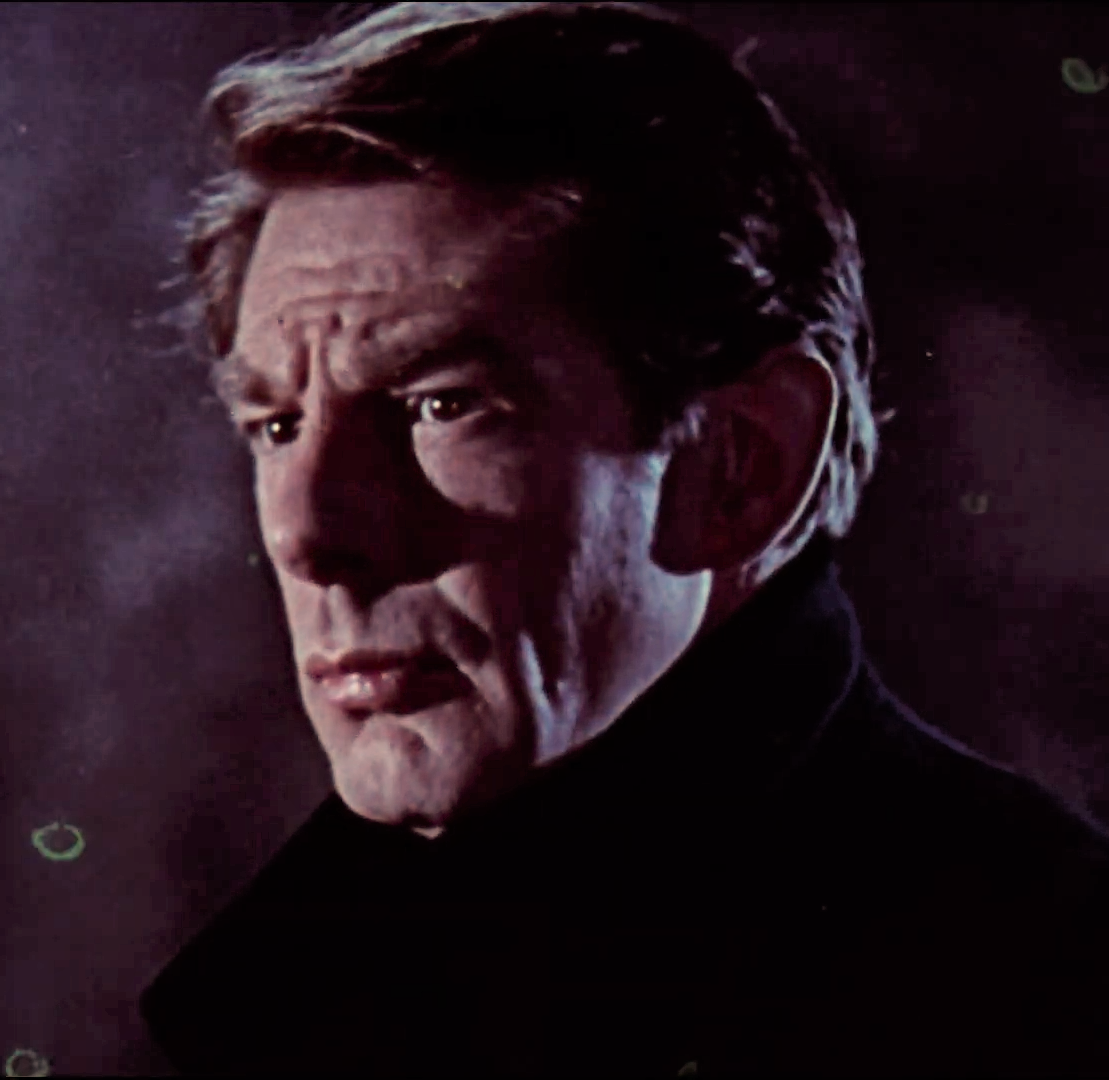
Holmwood played by Michael Gough in Dracula (1958)

Though a major character in the novel, Arthur Holmwood has been omitted from some adaptations of the story. In the 1977 adaptation Count Dracula, he is merged with the character Quincey Morris and renamed Quincey Holmwood. To date he has been portrayed in films and television by:

- Cahit Irgat (as Turan) in Drakula İstanbul'da (Dracula in Istanbul) (1953) – here he is the fiancé of Sadan (Lucy) in 1950s Turkey and he stakes her when she becomes a vampire.
- Michael Gough in Dracula (1958) – in this he is a major character, Lucy's brother and Mina's husband.
- Jiří Zahajský in Hrabe Drakula (1971) – he is portrayed faithfully to his counterpart in the novel.
- Simon Ward in Dracula (1973) – here he is a major character, who together with Van Helsing defeats Dracula.
- Richard Barnes (as Quincey Holmwood) in Count Dracula (1977).
- Cary Elwes in Bram Stoker's Dracula (1992) – he is portrayed faithfully to his counterpart in the novel.
- Conrad Hornby in Dracula (2002).
- Stephane Leonard in Dracula: Pages from a Virgin's Diary (2002).
- Kishore (as Ady) in Dracula (2005) – an Indian television series on Asianet.
- Dan Stevens in Dracula (2006) – Holmwood is a more important character here than he is in the novel and is portrayed much more negatively, aiding Dracula's travels to England in the belief that Dracula may be able to cure him of the syphilis that prevents him from consummating his marriage to Lucy.
- Jonathan Howard in Abraham's Boys (2025) An American horror film based on the short story of the same name by Joe Hill. A side character who, nearly 20 years after the novel, began to doubt the original events and wonder if Lucy had actually become a vampire or if they were all horribly mistaken and he had murdered his wife under Van Helsing's deluded direction.

=== On stage ===
- Arthur Holmwood appears in Dracula, the Musical by Frank Wildhorn. Here his portrayal is faithful to the novel. He was played by Chris Hoch in Broadway production of the musical.
- Arthur Holmwood was portrayed by Matthew Koon in 2019 Northern Ballet's production of Dracula by David Nixon. The production was recorded and showed in UK cinemas on Halloween and then broadcast on BBC4 in 2020.

=== Other media ===
- In the 1938 Mercury Theatre radio production of Dracula, Holmwood's character was combined with John Seward's and renamed Arthur Seward, who was voiced by Orson Welles who also voiced Dracula in the adaptation.
- The 2004 film Dracula 3000 features a character named Arthur Holmwood, though it is a futuristic science fiction/horror film and this Holmwood is not intended to be the same person.
- In the full motion video based game Dracula Unleashed, Holmwood is played by Jay Nickerson.
- In the novel Anno Dracula by Kim Newman, in which the events of Stoker's Dracula ended with the villain slaying Abraham Van Helsing and subsequently conquering the United Kingdom, Holmwood is again a major character. Having himself become a vampire—which Newman justifies on the grounds that Holmwood was the most useless member of the group of hunters, contributing nothing to the effort beyond his association with Lucy, and was therefore the most likely candidate to betray the group—he is now an aide to the new Prime Minister, Lord Ruthven. In this version, Holmwood, though outwardly kind and genteel, is actually a megalomaniac who hopes to eventually use his new vampiric powers to usurp Ruthven and, eventually, Dracula himself, showing little concern for even the rules of vampiric society. He is eventually killed in a confrontation with Doctor Seward, the only human survivor of Van Helsing's hunters, when Seward encounters Holmwood as he kills his latest victim (Seward having become 'Jack the Ripper' in this timeline).
- The fourth season of the superhero series Titans features a character named Arthur Holmwood (portrayed by Tim Post) who poses as Lex Luthor's personal physician, but is secretly a supernatural assassin with the Church of Blood. Wearing a raven mask, he killed women and harvested the blood from the males in their life. This lasted until he was incinerated during his fight with Raven.
- In the 1997 manga Hellsing, Holmwood is seen during a flashback of the vampire Alucard's defeat as Count Dracula, embracing Mina Harker as Alucard lays dying. In Hellsing's iteration of the events of Dracula, Holmwood is engaged to Mina rather than Lucy Westenra.
