= Renfield (film) =

2023 film by Chris McKay

- Theatrical release poster
- Directed by: Chris McKay
- Screenplay by: Ryan Ridley
- Story by: Robert Kirkman
- Based on: Dracula by Bram Stoker
- Produced by: Chris McKay; Samantha Nisenboim; Bryan Furst; Sean Furst; Robert Kirkman; David Alpert
- Starring: Nicholas Hoult; Awkwafina; Ben Schwartz; Shohreh Aghdashloo; Brandon Scott Jones; Adrian Martinez; Nicolas Cage
- Cinematography: Mitchell Amundsen
- Edited by: Zene Baker; Ryan Folsey; Giancarlo Ganziano
- Music by: Marco Beltrami
- Production companies: Universal Pictures; Skybound Entertainment; Giant Wildcat
- Distributed by: Universal Pictures
- Release dates: March 30, 2023 (Overlook Film Festival); April 14, 2023 (United States)
- Running time: 93 minutes
- Country: United States
- Language: English
- Budget: $65 million
- Box office: $26.9 million

Renfield is a 2023 American comedy horror film, with some characteristics of an action film. Renfield was inspired by characters from Bram Stoker's 1897 novel Dracula, as well as the 1931 Dracula feature film adaptation. Produced and directed by Chris McKay, Renfield features Nicholas Hoult as Renfield, and co-stars Awkwafina, Ben Schwartz, Shohreh Aghdashloo, Brandon Scott Jones, Adrian Martinez, and Nicolas Cage. The story follows Renfield who, after decades as a groveling servant for Count Dracula, seeks a new purpose in life.

After the critical and commercial failure of the 2017 reboot of The Mummy, and subsequent fallout of a new Universal Monsters shared universe, Robert Kirkman pitched a reimagining of Dracula, leaning more into the comedic aspects of the story and focusing on the character of Renfield, produced through his company Skybound Entertainment. Dexter Fletcher was originally attached as director in 2019, but McKay eventually replaced him, working off the script by Ryan Ridley and Kirkman's original pitch. Much of Renfield's cast joined the production between August 2021 to January 2022, and filming took place from February to August 2022. Marco Beltrami composed the film's score.

Renfield had its world premiere at the Overlook Film Festival on March 30, 2023, and was released in the United States on April 14, 2023 by Universal Pictures. The film received mixed reviews from film critics, and was considered a box-office bomb, grossing $26.9 million on a $65 million budget.

== Plot ==
In the early 20th century, Transylvanian vampire Count Dracula meets English lawyer R. M. Renfield. Renfield hopes to broker a land deal, and after proving to be a useful assistant, he becomes Dracula's familiar, which grants him immortality as well as super strength and speed when he consumes bugs.

Ninety years later, Renfield has grown weary of bringing victims to Dracula and being abused by him. They recently had a close call with vampire hunters who almost killed the count, so the duo moves to New Orleans to recuperate. There, Renfield discovers a 12-step self-help group for people in codependent relationships. He tracks down one of the group member's abusive lovers so he can give him to Dracula without feeling remorse, but they are attacked by an assassin hired by the rival Lobo crime family, whom Renfield kills.

The assassin's boss Teddy Lobo drives off and runs into a sobriety checkpoint that is run by police officer Rebecca Quincy, who arrests him. At the police station, Teddy is released, while Rebecca has a confrontation with her sister Kate, an FBI agent.

Dracula tells Renfield that the criminals he has brought as food are insufficient and he desires the blood of the pure. Renfield goes to a restaurant to abduct commoners while Rebecca is led there by clues from the crime scene. The two are caught in an attack on Rebecca's life that Teddy has been pressured into making. Renfield and Rebecca defend themselves, killing several gang members.

Teddy's mother, Bellafrancesca, orders him to hunt down the man who killed her footsoldiers, and he encounters Dracula when Renfield is away. The two form an alliance while Renfield heeds the teachings of his self-help group and decides to make a life for himself apart from his master. He gives a statement to the police to help them stop the Lobos. However, Dracula learns of Renfield's betrayal and slaughters the support group in front of him.

Rebecca finds Renfield surrounded by dead bodies, causing her to arrest him until she is swarmed by corrupt police officers and the Lobos, who also want revenge on Renfield. Rebecca refuses to hand him over and escapes with him. The next morning, Rebecca finds that Renfield has saved her life, and he explains his true origin. The two fight through corrupt police officers and Lobo henchmen who come to the apartment to kill them, but Rebecca discovers that Kate has been taken hostage by Dracula and Bellafrancesca. She and Renfield stockpile weapons and bugs to storm the Lobos' headquarters, only to find that Dracula has empowered over a half-dozen gang members, including Teddy, with Renfield's supernatural abilities.

Renfield kills Teddy and the gang members while Rebecca heads to stop Dracula, only to find that Kate is beaten to near-death and only the healing properties of Dracula's blood can save her, which he will offer in exchange for Rebecca's loyalty. She tricks Dracula and injures him by exposing him to sunlight, leading to him having a standoff with Renfield and Rebecca that ends with the two capturing him in a magical circle.

Renfield and Rebecca beat Dracula into pieces, which they encase in concrete and scatter among the city's water system. Kate is healed, Bellafrancesca is arrested, and Renfield resurrects his self-help group friends with Dracula's blood, feeling empowered to make a new life for himself.

== Cast ==
- Nicholas Hoult as Robert Montague Renfield, the long-suffering servant of Dracula
- Nicolas Cage as Dracula, a legendary Transylvanian vampire and Renfield's ill-tempered and narcissistic master
- Awkwafina as Officer Rebecca Quincy, an aggressive traffic cop working for the NOPD while seeking to bring the Lobo Crime Family to get justice for her late father.
- Ben Schwartz as Tedward Lobo, a cowardly mob enforcer and Bellafrancesca's son
- Shohreh Aghdashloo as Bellafrancesca Lobo, matriarch of the Lobo family and Tedward's mother
- Brandon Scott Jones as Mark, the leader of Renfield's support group
- Adrian Martinez as Chris, a traffic cop and Rebecca's co-worker and partner
- Camille Chen as Kate Quincy, an FBI agent and Rebecca's sister
- Christopher Matthew Cook as Bob, a support group member
- Bess Rous as Caitlyn, a support group member
- Jenna Kanell as Carol, a support group member
- James Moses Black as Captain Browning, Rebecca's corrupt boss
- Caroline Williams as Vanessa
- William Ragsdale as a priest killed by Dracula during a failed attempt to destroy him
- Miles Doleac as a vampire hunter who falls prey to Dracula

Additionally, Helen Chandler and Edward Van Sloan respectively appear as Mina Seward and Van Helsing via archive footage from Dracula (1931).

== Production ==
=== Development ===
In July 2014, Universal Pictures announced classic horror film properties, including the character of Count Dracula, as part of a unified shared universe with Alex Kurtzman and Chris Morgan attached to oversee its development. After the negative reception of Dracula Untold (2014), its connections to a unified series were downplayed, and The Mummy (2017) was re-positioned as the first film in the series. The Mummy, a critical and commercial failure, resulted in Universal's decision to shift its focus to individual storytelling and move away from the shared universe concept.

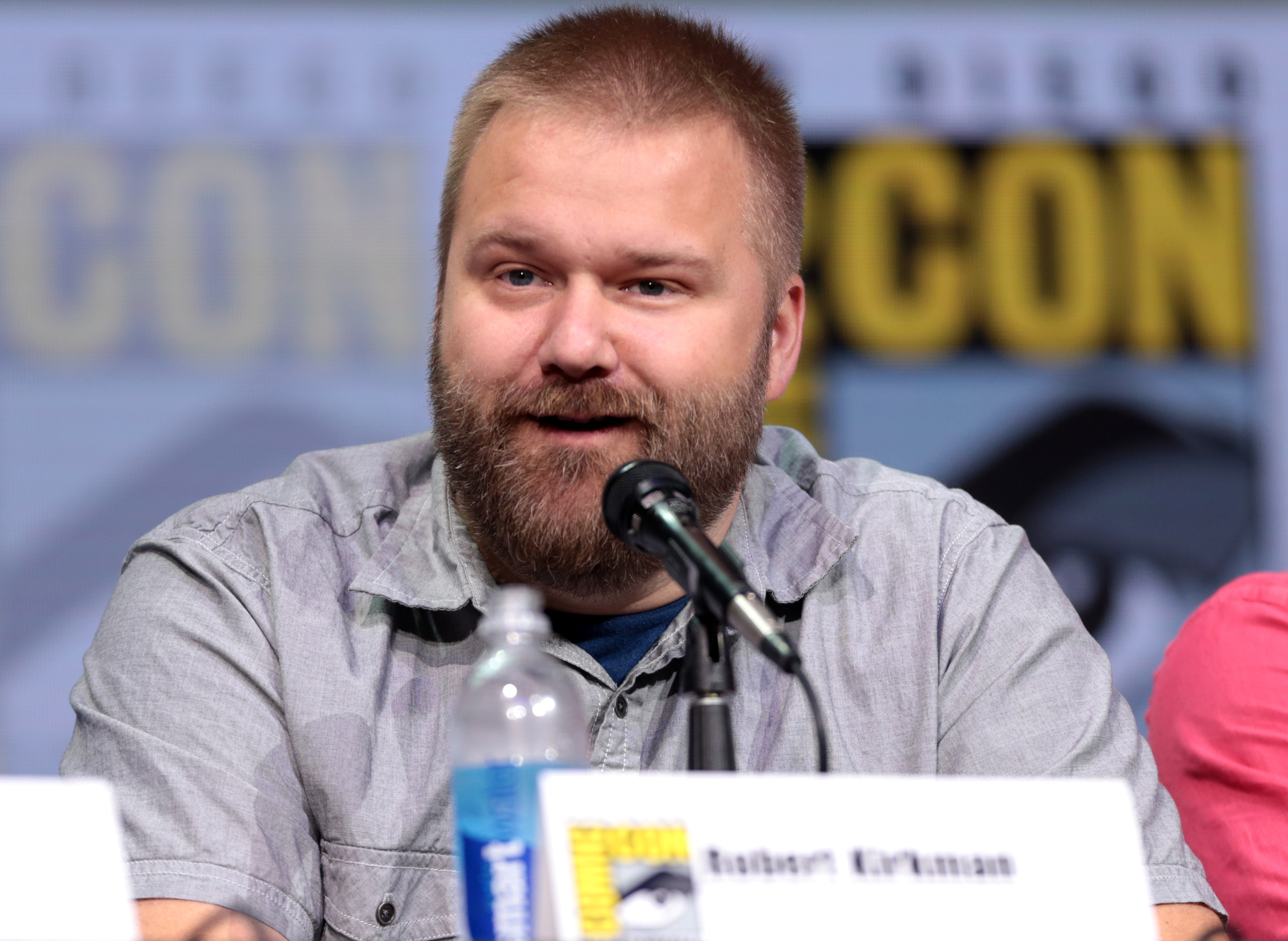
Renfield is based on an original pitch by comic book writer Robert Kirkman.

Renfield is based on an original pitch by Robert Kirkman and uses a screenplay by Ryan Ridley. In November 2019, Dexter Fletcher was hired to direct the film for Universal and Skybound Entertainment. The film was described as a comedic approach to the story of Count Dracula, in the vein of Taika Waititi's vampire mockumentary What We Do in the Shadows (2014), that focuses on the character of Renfield. In 2020, Leigh Whannell's The Invisible Man became a commercial and critical success for Universal and served as a relaunch to its monster universe. In April 2021, Chris McKay entered negotiations to direct after Fletcher left to work on a reboot of The Saint for Paramount Pictures. McKay was hired because he reportedly gave a successful pitch combining the story's mix of humor and action, "something the studio was looking to have more of". In March 2023, McKay described the film as a "quasi-sequel" to Universal's 1931 English-language film Dracula, depicting the same characters of Dracula and Renfield ninety years on, with the film's black-and-white opening scene depicting the beginning of Dracula (1931) with Nicolas Cage and Nicholas Hoult respectively inserted in place of Bela Lugosi and Dwight Frye as Count Dracula and Renfield.

=== Casting ===
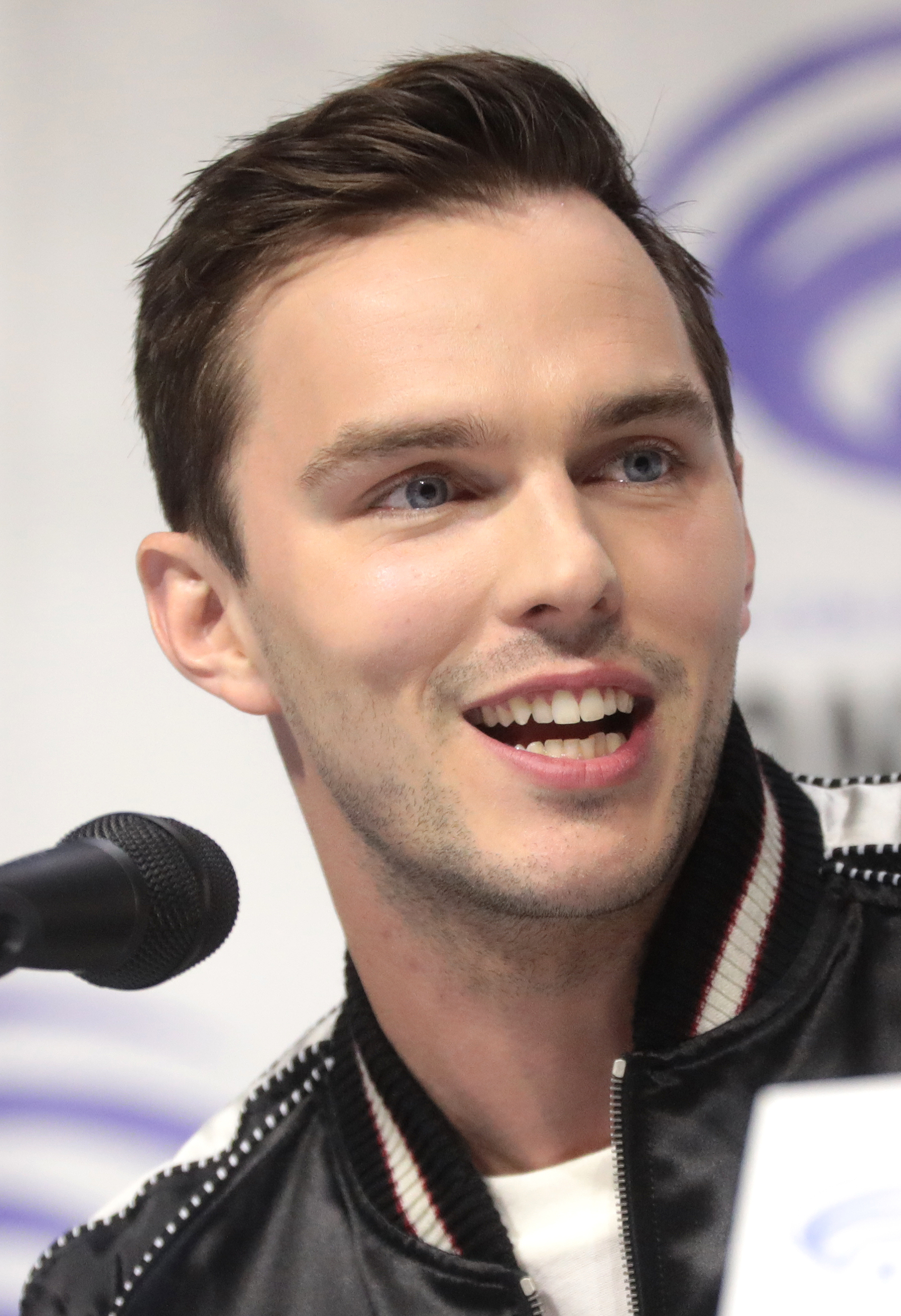
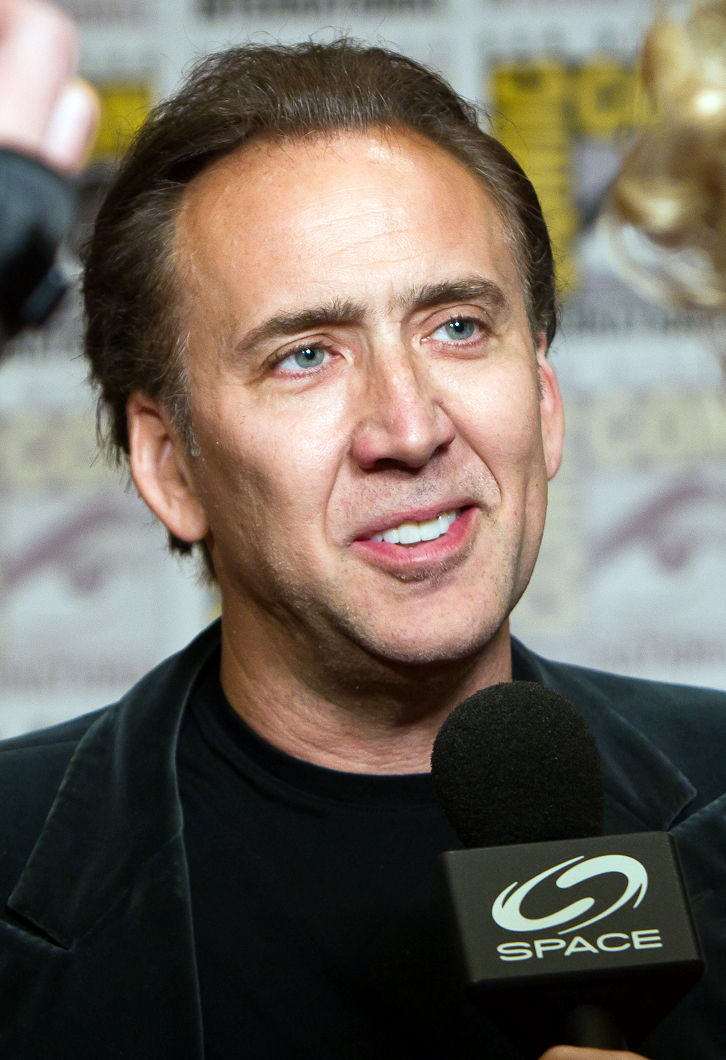
Nicholas Hoult and Nicolas Cage play Renfield and Count Dracula, respectively.

Nicholas Hoult was cast as Renfield in August 2021. Nicolas Cage was cast to play Count Dracula in November, Awkwafina and Ben Schwartz were added to the cast in December, and Adrian Martinez, Shohreh Aghdashloo, Bess Rous, James Moses Black, Caroline Williams, and Brandon Scott Jones were confirmed to star the following year. An "enormous" fan of Dracula and the source material, Bram Stoker's 1897 novel of the same name, Cage prepared for his role by observing the distinctive ways Dracula was portrayed on screen by Bela Lugosi, Frank Langella, and Gary Oldman. "What can I bring that will be different?", he said, "I want it to pop in a unique way. We've seen it played well, we've seen it play not so well, so what can we do? So I'm thinking to really focus on the movement of the character ... [and] that perfect tone of comedy and horror". Cage mentioned An American Werewolf in London (1981), Ring (1998), and Malignant (2021) as inspirations for the role. The film is Cage's first live-action film by a major studio since Ghost Rider: Spirit of Vengeance (2011).

Hoult would go on to star in Robert Eggers' Nosferatu (2024), another Dracula-themed film and a remake of F. W. Murnau's Nosferatu: A Symphony of Horror (1922), itself a screen adaptation of Stoker's Dracula.

=== Filming ===
Filming began in New Orleans on February 3, 2022, with Mitchell Amundsen serving as cinematographer. On February 8, more than twenty vehicles belonging to the production crew were burglarized. One security guard was present at the time of the incident, which occurred late at night in a secured parking lot. Crew member Elmo Peoples said the vandals had stolen his insurance papers, two bank cards, and a laptop. He added, "I'm supposed to be here all week and I don't even want to come back because I feel like they don't really care about us as much as the main characters or actors." Love Bugs Film LLC reassured the production crew that they would hire additional security. Filming wrapped on April 14, 2022, exactly one year prior to the film's scheduled release.

The film's black-and-white opening scenes recreate the events of Dracula (1931) with Nicolas Cage and Nicholas Hoult respectively inserted in place of Bela Lugosi and Dwight Frye as Count Dracula and Renfield ("compositing the actors into the old backgrounds — we're just erasing [the original actors] and putting Cage and Hoult in"), with Helen Chandler and Edward Van Sloan appearing as Mina Seward and Abraham Van Helsing via archive footage. Zene Baker, Ryan Folsey and Giancarlo Ganziano served as editors.

== Release ==
Renfield had its world premiere at the Overlook Film Festival on March 30, 2023, and was released in US theaters on April 14, 2023, by Universal Pictures. The film was released on Blu-Ray and DVD in the US on June 6, 2023, and began streaming on Peacock June 9.

=== Video game ===
Renfield: Bring Your Own Blood, a video game based on the film, was developed by Mega Cat Studios, published by Skybound Games and released on April 12, 2023, for Microsoft Windows. Renfield: Bring Your Own Blood is a bullet hell roguelike game.

== Reception ==
=== Box office ===
Renfield grossed $17.3 million in the United States and Canada, and $9.6 million in other territories, for a worldwide total of $26.9 million. It has been deemed a box office flop.

In the United States and Canada, Renfield was released alongside The Pope's Exorcist, Mafia Mamma, Sweetwater, and Suzume, and was projected to gross $8–10 million from 3,375 theaters in its opening weekend. The film made $3.1 million on its first day, including $900,000 from Thursday night previews. It went on to debut to $8.1 million, finishing fourth behind The Super Mario Bros. Movie, The Pope's Exorcist, and John Wick: Chapter 4. The film made $3.1 million in its second weekend (dropping 61%), finishing in eighth.

=== Critical response ===
On the review aggregator website Rotten Tomatoes, 58% of 301 critics' reviews are positive, with an average rating of 5.8/10. The website's consensus reads: "Although it fails to take full advantage of its committed stars and killer premise, Renfield's batty horror-comedy blend sinks in just enough to leave an impression." Metacritic, which uses a weighted average, assigned the film a score of 53 out of 100, based on 49 critics, indicating "mixed or average" reviews. Audiences surveyed by CinemaScore gave the film an average grade of "B–" on an A+ to F scale, while those polled by PostTrak gave it an 86% positive score.

Tim Robey of The Daily Telegraph gave the film three out of five stars, writing, "It fulfils the basic requirements of a beat-'em-up formula established by Buffy and Blade, but that's it. To get any further, we'd have wanted a real sharpening of the emotional stakes." Amy Nicholson of The Wall Street Journal wrote, "The small gags are great, the overall story arc is weak—particularly a quasi-romantic subplot where a cop (Awkwafina) challenges Renfield to turn from heel to hero", and gave the film a B grade.

Conversely, Kevin Maher of The Times gave the film a score of two out of five stars, calling it "a gore-splattered, consistently tiresome, one-joke movie that could only have been pitched in a Hollywood development meeting as, you know, 'It's fucking Dracula!'" Alison Willmore of Vulture praised the film's premise, but said it had "maybe a comedy sketch's worth of ideas to stretch over a feature-length run time." ABC News's Peter Travers wrote, "what started as a clever, contemporary spin on the Dracula myth gets swallowed up into a quicksand of cartoonishly repetitive, R-rated action cliches that make Renfield seem too long at a scant 93 minutes."

=== Accolades ===
Renfield received a nomination for Best Comedy Poster at the 2023 Golden Trailer Awards. At the 51st Saturn Awards, it received 5 nominations, winning Best Supporting Actor for Nicolas Cage.
