= Nicht von schlechten Eltern =

German TV series

- Created by: Rainer Boldt
- Country of origin: Germany
- No. of seasons: 3
- No. of episodes: 39

Production
- Running time: 50 mins

Original release
- Release: 8 November 1993 – 8 April 1998

Nicht von schlechten Eltern (English: Not From Bad Parents) is a German television series produced by Radio Bremen and TV60Filmproduktion from 1993-1998. The TV series ran for 3 seasons, totalling 39 episodes. The series was filmed in Bremen, Achim, Brake, and Wilhelmshaven.

The TV series revolves around the family life of the Schefers after they move house from Dobersdorf to Bremen.

== Cast ==
- Sabine Postel - Sybille Schefer
- Ulrich Pleitgen - Wolfgang Schefer
- Patrick Bach - Felix Schefer
- Tina Ruland - Henrietta ‘Jenny’ Schefer
- Steven Bennett - Moritz Schefer
- Colin Kippenberg - Alex Schefer
- Renate Delfs - Lisbeth ‘Oma Lisbeth’ Schefer

== See also ==
- List of German television series
