= Stephane Leonard =

German painter (born 1979)

Stephane Leonard (born April 19, 1979) is a German artist. Leonard works in various different media. His oeuvre spans from drawing and painting to sound installation, music, video installation, music videos and film.

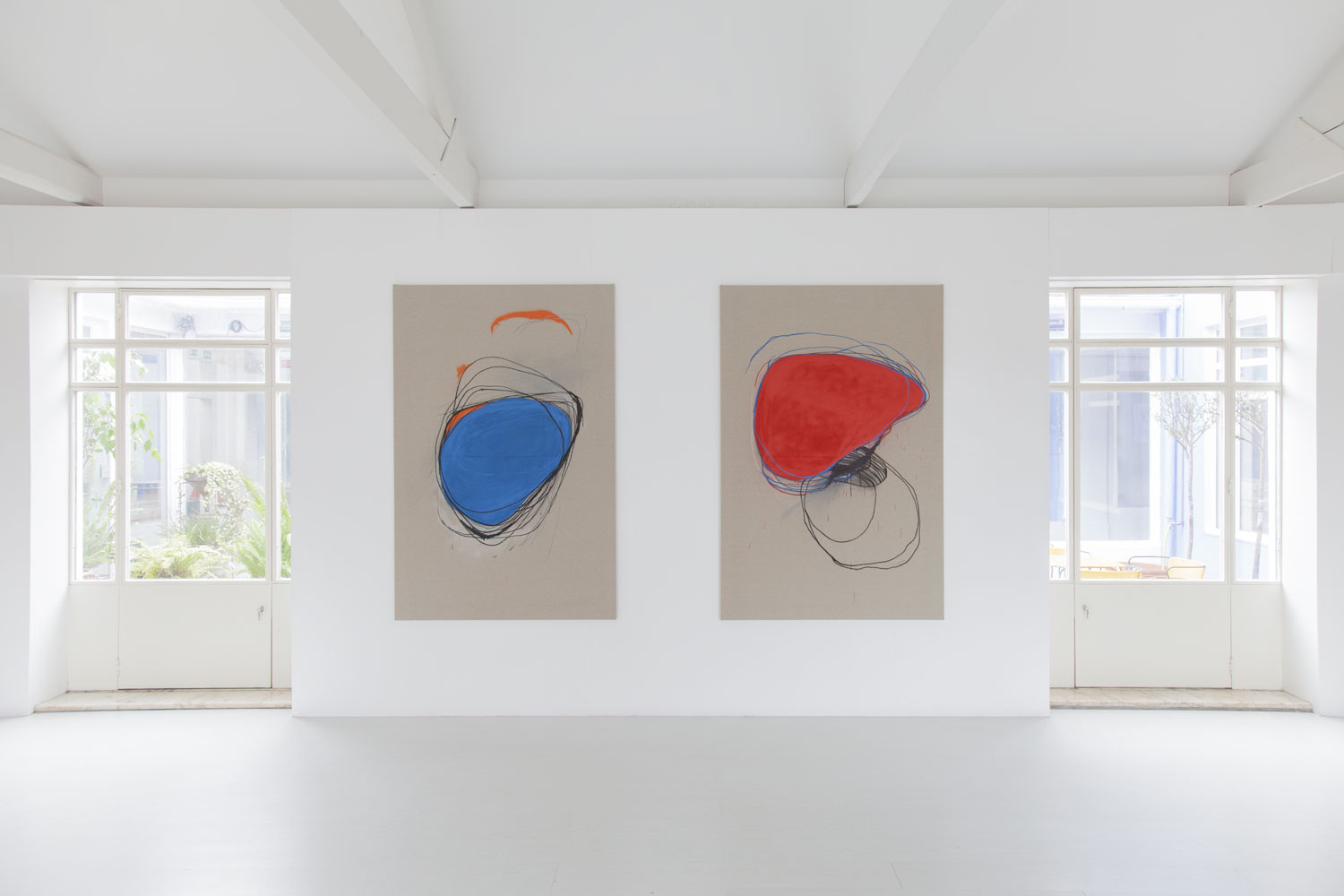
StephaneLeonard OT Trauma installationview1 Porto 2015

== Education ==
Stephane Leonard studied philosophy and art history at the Humboldt University of Berlin from 2001 to 2002. From 2002 to 2007 he studied fine arts at the University of the Arts Bremen. His main focus was on drawing, studying in the class of professor Paco Knöller. Leonard was also a frequent visitor of the video art class under Professor Jean-François Guiton and participated in various courses about Electroacoustic music and Elektronic music and composition. From 2007 to 2008 Stephane Leonard became a master student (honours student) under Paco Knöller. Since 2014 Leonard is a guest lecturer at the Hochschule für Technik und Wirtschaft Berlin, where he teaches drawing and sound design at the department of Industrial Design.

== Awards/residencies ==
- 2007/2008 master student under Paco Knöller
- 2007 winner of the Video Art Prize from the city of Bremen, Germany
- 2008 nominated for the master student scholarship: Junge Kunst Essen, Germany
- 2009 composition journey through South and Eastern Europe with the Endlichen Automaten (Laptop Orchestra Berlin) sponsored by the Robert Bosch Stiftung, the Hungarian cultural capital Pécs and the Goethe-Institut
- 2010 artist In residence at the USF Verftet in Bergen, Norway
- 2010 working grant for the Endliche Automaten (Laptoporchester Berlin) in Pécs, Hungary
- 2011 winner of the Award of Excellence at the Los Angeles Movie Awards for the music video: Bodi Bill – Brand New Carpet
- 2012 Best Music Video Award at the Porto7 Oporto International Film Festival for the music video: Bodi Bill – What
- 2013 exhibition stipend by the city of Berlin for the Galerie im Turm (state run art gallery)
- 2015 artist in residence and exhibition stipend at Maus Habitos in Porto, Portugal
- 2016 exhibition stipend for the Temporäre Galerie in der Quartiershalle Campus Rütli – CR², Berlin

== Exhibitions ==
=== Solo exhibitions ===
- 2002 temporäre Galerie Themenläden, Berlin
- 2004 Hochschule für Künste, Bremen (Vordiplom)
- 2006 Galerie Invalid, Berlin – ‘New York Short Stories’
- 2008 OWSUM Art Space, Groningen (NL) – ‘copy.space.copy.ship’
- 2010 Podium Art Space, Oslo, NO – ‘I am here, please destroy me’
- 2013 Staub Shop / Galerie Berlin – ‘Crazy Diamond’
- 2013 naivsuper Galerie, Berlin – ‘HOUSTON I AM THE PROBLEM’
- 2013 Galerie im Turm, Berlin – ‘YOU ARE MY FREEDOM / I AM YOUR PRISON’ 2014
- 2013 okazi Galerie, Berlin – ‘Neid fressen Seele auf’
- 2015 Maus Habitos, Porto, Portugal – ‘Trauma’
- 2015 Projectspace 404, Bremen – ‘Chasing A Ghost’
- 2015 okazi Galerie, Berlin
- 2016 Temporäre Galerie in der Quartiershalle Campus Rütli – CR², Berlin – 'Inseln'

=== Group exhibitions (selection) ===
- 2003 Bangkok University Art Gallery, Bangkok, Thailand – ‘Bangkok-Bremen’
- 2004 Focke Museum, Bremen
- 2004 Neues Museum Weserburg, Bremen – ‘HfK trifft REM: Reihe Elektronischer Musik’
- 2005 Neues Museum Weserburg, Bremen – ‘Stabile Seitenlage’ (JuliJuni mit Dave Allen)
- 2005 Contemporary Artist Center North Adams, MA (USA) – ‘Unsilently’
- 2006 Diapason Gallery, New York, NY, USA – ‘Klangperformance’
- 2006 Galerie Pankow, Berlin – ‘Freies Feld’
- 2006 Kunsthalle Bremen – ‘40 Jahre Videokunst
- 2006 Flux Factory Queens, NY (USA) – ‘Works on Paper’
- 2007 Städtische Galerie im Buntentor, Bremen – ‘30 Jahre Förderpreis’
- 2007 Hochschule für Künste Bremen – ‘Fantasie’ und ‘Diplomausstellung’
- 2008 Neues Museum Weserburg, Bremen – ‘Videokunst Förderpreis’
- 2008 Städtische Galerie im Buntentor, Bremen – ‘Unendlich (Meisterschüler)’
- 2006 Kirgisian National Museum for Fine Arts – ‘Package for Kirgisien’
- 2009 General Public, Berlin – ‘Ubiquitous Oscillations’
- 2010 Riga Art Space Riga, Estonia – ‘STERNE SEHEN’
- 2010 Manzara Perspectives Istanbul, Turkey – ‘EVEN MY MUM CAN MAKE A BOOK’
- 2010 Neuer Kunstverein Wuppertal, GER – ‘Utopia/Dystopia’ 2011
- 2011 Sprungturm Galerie Köln – ‘PogoBooks Art Show’
- 2011 Neonchocolate Galerie Berlin – ‘naivsuper Book / PogoBooks Art Show’
- 2011 General Public Artspace Berlin – ‘naivsuper Book / PogoBooks Art Show’
- 2012 Süd Korea – ‘Zine Pages Fest’
- 2013 Kunstverein Tiergarten / Galerie Nord Berlin – ‘Anonyme Zeichner 2013’
- 2013 Galerie Delikatessenhaus Leipzig – ‘Anonyme Zeichner 2013’
- 2013 Temporary Art Centre (TAC) Eindhoven, NL – ‘Anonyme Zeichner 2013’
- 2013 Sixtus Villa Berlin – ‘Unterströmung’
- 2013 Das Gift Artspace Berlin – ‘Shambolic’
- 2014 Pavillon am Milchhof – ‘Anonyme Zeichner 2014’
- 2014 Stiftung Schloss Neuhardenberg – ‘Brandenburgischer Kunstpreis 2014’

== Discography ==
=== Publications ===
- Schmalfilmer EP (sinnbus, 2002)
- Schmalfilmer RMX 2003 EP (naivsuper, 2003)
- Hörtheater (naivsuper, 2004)
- Elegy (serein, 2005)
- TRi (luvsound, 2006)
- Exponat (Froggi, 2006)
- Crown Heights (luvsound, 2007)
- Lykkelig Dyr (Heilskabaal, naivsuper, 2008)
- "Please destroy me" (Frozen Elephants, 2010)

=== with Plastic Doll ===
- 26 secret codes to brainwash your neighbour (naivsuper, 2004)

=== with Leo Mars ===
- lightears (naivsuper 2008)

=== Compilations ===
- VA Bias (luumu, 2004)
- VA Tracks in the Snow (serene, 2005)
- VA Our Lives in the Bush of Disquiet (disquiet, 2006)
- VA OIO (serein, 2006)
- VA Fieldrecording Festival (2006)
- VA Berlin taperun (2010)

=== Contributions ===
- Christophe Bailleau: La Lude / La Sonde (naivsuper, 2006)
