= Hamilton Deane =

Irish actor (1879–1958)

- Deane in 1939
- Born: December 2, 1879; New Ross, Ireland
- Died: October 25, 1958 (aged 78); London, England
- Occupations: Actor, playwright, director

Hamilton Deane (2 December 1879 – 25 October 1958) was an Irish actor, playwright and director. He played a key role in popularising Bram Stoker's 1897 novel Dracula as a 1924 stage play and a 1931 film.

== Biography ==
Deane was born in New Ross in County Wexford and grew up in Clontarf, a suburb of Dublin. His family lived close to the families of both Bram Stoker and Florence Balcombe (Stoker's wife), and his mother had been acquainted with Bram Stoker in her youth.

Deane entered the theatre as a young man, first appearing in 1899 with the Henry Irving Company (Stoker was stage manager for Irving for many years). Even before he formed his own troupe in the early 1920s, Deane had been thinking about bringing Dracula to the stage. Stoker had organised a copyright reading of the novel in 1897 but it had never advanced to a full theatrical production. Unable to find a scriptwriter to take on the project, Deane wrote the play himself in a four-week period of inactivity while he was suffering with a severe cold. He then contacted Florence Stoker, Bram's widow, and negotiated a deal for the dramatic rights.

Deane re-imagined Count Dracula as a more urbane and theatrically acceptable character who could plausibly enter London society. It was Deane's idea that the count should wear a tuxedo and stand-up collar, and a flowing cape which concealed Dracula while he slipped through a trap-door in the stage floor, giving the impression that he had disappeared. Deane also arranged to have a uniformed nurse available at performances, ready to administer smelling salts should anyone faint.

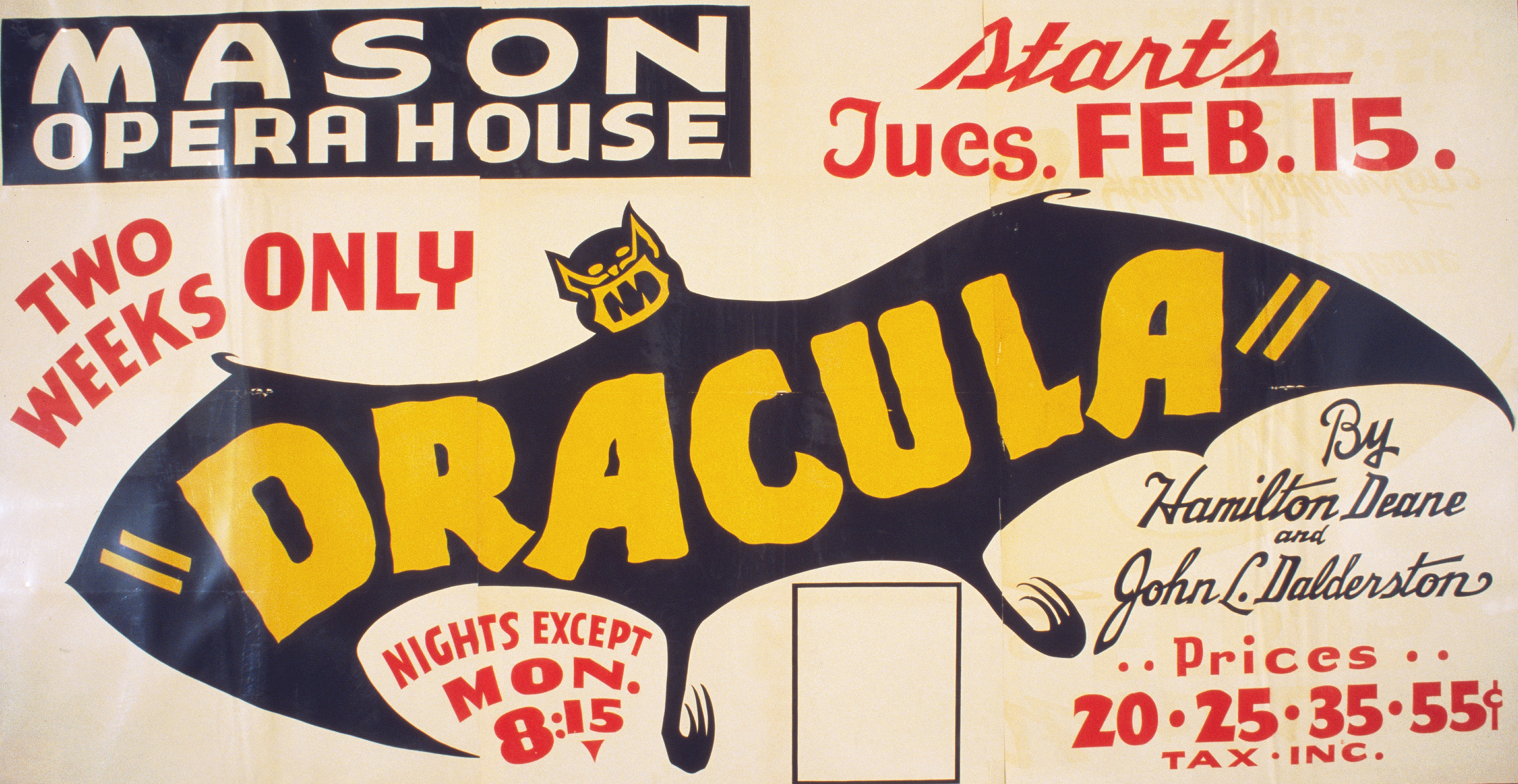
Poster for a Federal Theatre Project production of Dracula in 1938

Deane's play premiered at the Grand Theatre, Derby on 15 May 1924. Despite critics' misgivings, the audiences loved it. With Raymond Huntley as the Count and Deane as Van Helsing, it was a huge success and toured for years. Deane had initially intended to play the role of the count himself. When the play crossed the Atlantic in 1927, the role of Dracula was taken by the then-unknown Hungarian actor Béla Lugosi. For its US debut, Dracula was rewritten by the American playwright John L. Balderston. The show ran for a year on Broadway and for two more years on tour, breaking all previous records for any show put on tour in the United States. It is the Deane/Balderston interpretation upon which the classic Tod Browning film Dracula (1931) was based.

== Works ==
- Deane, Hamilton, and John L. Balderston. Dracula: The Vampire Play in Three Acts. New York: Samuel French, 1927.

== Bibliography ==
- Dracula (The Original 1931 Shooting Script). Atlantic City, NJ: Magic Image Filmbooks, 1990.
- Glut, Donald F. The Dracula Book. Metuchen, NJ: Scarecrow Press, 1975.
- Skal, David J., ed. Dracula: The Ultimate, Illustrated Edition of the World-Famous Vampire Play. New York: St. Martin's Press, 1993.
