= Fantastique =

French term for a literary and cinematic genre

Fantastique is a French term for a literary and cinematic genre and mode that is characterized by the intrusion of supernatural elements into the realistic framework of a story, accompanied by uncertainty about their existence. The concept comes from the French literary and critical tradition, and is distinguished from the word "fantastic", which is associated with the broader term of fantasy in the English literary tradition. According to the literary theorist Tzvetan Todorov (Introduction à la littérature fantastique), the fantastique is distinguished from the marvellous by the hesitation it produces between the supernatural and the natural, the possible and the impossible, and sometimes between the logical and the illogical. The marvellous, on the other hand, appeals to the supernatural in which, once the presuppositions of a magical world have been accepted, things happen in an almost normal and familiar way. The genre emerged in the 18th century and knew a golden age in 19th century Europe, particularly in France and Germany.

== Definition ==
Three major critical sources in French literary theory give the same fundamental definition of the concept: Le Conte fantastique en France de Nodier à Maupassant of Pierre-Georges Castex, De la féerie à la science-fiction of Roger Caillois and Introduction à la littérature fantastique of Tzvetan Todorov. In these three essays, the fantastique is defined as the intrusion of supernatural phenomena into an otherwise realist narrative. It evokes phenomena which are not only left unexplained but which are inexplicable from the reader's point of view. In this respect, Tzvetan Todorv explains that the fantastique is somewhere between the French concept of "marvellous" (merveilleux), where the supernatural is accepted and entirely reasonable in the imaginary world of a non-realist narrative, and the uncanny (étrange in French), where apparently supernatural phenomena are explained according to realist precepts and accepted as normal. In an English speaking theoretical perspective, it can therefore be considered as a subgenre of fantasy.

Instead, characters in a work of fantastique are, just like the readers, unwilling to accept the supernatural events that occur. This refusal may be mixed with doubt, disbelief, fear, or some combination of those reactions. The fantastique is often linked to a particular ambiance, a sort of tension in the face of the impossible. A good deal of fear is often involved, either because the characters are afraid or because the author wants to provoke fright in the reader. However, fear is not an essential component of fantastique.

The French concept of fantastique in literature should therefore not be confused with the marvellous or fantasy (where the supernatural is posited and accepted from the outset), with science fiction (which is rational) or with horror, although these genres can be combined.

However, the English term "fantastic" can sometimes be used in the French sense as in the Literary Encyclopedia, since the term was translated as above in the English translation of Todorov's essay. This is nonetheless a minority use and much of the English critical literature that discusses fantastic literature associates the word with a broader meaning related to fantasy as in the works of Eric Rabkin, Rosemary Jackson, Lucie Armitt and David Sandner. The polysemy of the word fantastic and the difference of critical traditions of each country have led to controversies such as the one led by Stanislaw Lem.

The word is also polysemous in French: a distinction must be made between the academic definition and the everyday meaning. In everyday language, the word can refer to anything to do with the supernatural. Some people use in French the term médiéval-fantastique to refer to high fantasy, but it is not a term used by academic critics.

== Related genres ==
The fantastique is often considered to be very close to science fiction. However, there are important differences between them: science fiction is not supernatural, but rational. H. G. Wells's The Time Machine, for example, is a science-fiction novel because the hero travels back in time using a machine designed for the purpose—in other words, using a technological process that, while unknown in the current state of human knowledge, is presented as technological and therefore cannot be described as supernatural.

The fantastique narratives also differs from fantasy ones, such as those by J. R. R. Tolkien, when in fact they belong to the realm of the marvellous. It should also be noted that in the English-speaking world, fantastique literature is not considered a separate genre, but rather a sub-genre of low fantasy. The fantastique then combines the same characteristics as intrusion fantasy as defined by Farah Mendlesohn. The fantastique is also related to magic realism, a genre based as well on the insertion of supernatural elements into a realistic narrative. However, the supernatural is considered normal in magic realism, making it a branch of the marvellous rather than the fantastique.

Tzvetan Todorov thus defines the fantastique as being somewhere between the uncanny, i.e. a reality whose limits are pushed to the limit, as in Edgar Allan Poe's The Fall of the House of Usher, in which a rational analysis can be adopted, and the marvellous, where supernatural elements are considered normal: the fantastique is this in-between, this moment when the mind still hesitates between a rational and irrational explanation. As a final condition for the appearance of the fantastique, he adds a realistic universe or context: the setting must be perceived as natural in order to introduce the marks of the supernatural, and thus the hesitation that leads to the fantastique.

The Fantastique can encompass both works of the horror and gothic genres. Two representative stories might be:

- Algernon Blackwood's story "The Willows", where two men traveling down the Danube River are beset by an eerie feeling of malice and several improbable setbacks in their trip; the question that pervades the story is whether they are falling prey to the wilderness and their own imaginations, or if there really is something horrific out to get them.
- Edgar Allan Poe's story "The Black Cat", where a murderer is haunted by a black cat; but is it revenge from beyond the grave, or just a cat?

The fantastique is sometimes erroneously called the Grotesque or Supernatural fiction, because both the Grotesque and the Supernatural contain fantastic elements, yet they are not the same, as the fantastique is based on an ambiguity of those elements.

In Russian literature, the "fantastic" (фантастика) encompasses science fiction (called "science fantastic", научная фантастика), fantasy, and other non-realistic genres.

== History ==
=== Origins ===
When Charles Nodier wants to invent a fantastique history, when Nerval recalls Cazotte as an initiator in spite of himself, they both refer without hesitation to The Golden Ass (also called Metamorphoses) by Apuleius (1st c. AD). The hero of the Metamorphoses is supposed to come to a particularly mysterious region of Greece, Thessaly. The witches of this province were renowned, and the protagonist Lucius was transformed into a donkey after using the wrong ointment. A whole section of the novel, from the moment Lucius is metamorphosed to the moment he regains his primitive form, escapes the fantastique and foreshadows the future course of picaresque heroes. Only the beginning, when the witches' magic remains uncertain, could be considered fantastique. Works of fantastique, however, only began to appear in the 18th century, and this type of literature reached its golden age in the 19th century.

==== From marvellous to fantastique ====
Baroque (whether in the form of novels, plays or even operas) was the link between the Merveilleux of the Renaissance and the more formalized fairy tales of the Enlightenment period. The undeniable popularity of the genre was, in great part, attributable to the fact that Fairy Tales were safe; they did not imperil the soul—a serious concern for a nation which had just come out of an era of great religious persecution—and they appropriately reflected the grandeur of the Sun King's reign. Even if fairy tales and marvellous novels don't belong to the fantastique, they contributed to the emergence of the genre in Europe, since the creatures found in fantastique literature that invade reality often come from marvellous literature.

Cazotte is often considered as the creator of the fantastique genre in France with his novel Le Diable amoureux (The Devil in Love, 1772), sub-titled un roman fantastique, so labeled for the first time in literary history. In it, a young nobleman, Alvare, conjures up a demon who assumes the shape of a beautiful woman, Biondetta. At the end of the story, the young woman disappears, and we don't know if she ever really existed. Another work in the same vein was Vathek, a novel written directly into French in 1787 by English-born writer William Thomas Beckford. A Byronic figure steeped in occult knowledge and sexual perversions, Beckford allegedly wrote his novel non-stop in three days and two nights in a state of trance. Finally, in 1813, the very strange Le Manuscrit Trouvé à Saragosse (The Manuscript Found in Saragossa) was published. Like Vathek, it was written directly into French by a non-French writer, the Polish count and scientist Jan Potocki.

==== Gothic novel ====
The real source of the fantastique genre is the English Gothic novel of late 1785. In addition to the emergence of fantastique themes (ghosts, the Devil, vampires), these novels, characterised by a more pronounced atmosphere of horror, introduced the ambiguity characteristic of the genre. Among the most representative works are Horace Walpole's The Castle of Otranto, Matthew Gregory Lewis's The Monk (1796), Ann Radcliffe's The Mysteries of Udolpho (1794), William Godwin's Caleb Williams (1794), Charlotte Dacre's Zofloya, or the Moor (1806) and Charles Robert Maturin's Melmoth, the Wandering Man (1821).

==== Frenetic romanticism ====
In France, the discovery of English Gothic novels gave rise to a profusion of so-called "frenetic" novels (roman frénétique) (also known as "roman noir"). Still strongly influenced by the marvellous, these romantic works of the 1830s introduced a taste for horror and the macabre into the French novel.

The frenetic novel reached its apogee with the "petits romantiques". Pétrus Borel, in Champavert (1833) and especially in Madame de Putiphar (1839), was even more provocative than the English writers, particularly in his indulgence in the horrible. The cruelty of Champavert's stories foreshadows Auguste de Villiers de L'Isle-Adam. What's more, Borel wrote a truly fantastique tale, Gottfried Wolfgang (1843).

Among the outstanding works of the French Gothic period are novels which, having been written with the aim of parodying the tales of Lewis and Radcliffe, have become authentic roman noir. The literary critic Jules Janin wrote L'âne mort et la femme guillotinée (1829). Similarly, Frédéric Soulié's Les mémoires du Diable which combined the roman frénétique with the passions of the Marquis de Sade.

Notable works in that category include:

- Coelina, ou l'Enfant du Mystère [Coelina, or The Child Of Mystery] (1799) by François Guillaume Ducray-Duminil.
- Victor Hugo with Han d'Islande [Han Of Iceland] (1823), a bloody tale featuring a Viking warrior and a mythical bear, Bug-Jargal (1826) and the morbid and romantic L'Homme qui Rit a.k.a. The Man Who Laughs (1869) about a horribly disfigured man who lived in 17th century England.

=== Birth of the real fantastique in Germany ===
Fantastique literature in the strict sense of the terme was born in Germany in the early 19th century, with Adelbert von Chamisso (Peter Schlemihl), then Achim von Arnim and E.T.A. Hoffmann. Hoffmann's fantastique is characterised by exaltation, chaos and frenzy. The novel The Devil's Elixirs, which claims to be a descendant of Lewis's The Monk, often incoherently accumulates episodes of very different kinds: a love story, aesthetic or political meditations, picaresque adventures, a family epic, mystical ecstasies, etc. The theme of madness and solitude is central to both Hoffmann's and Chamisso's work.

Hoffmann had a universal and almost continuous influence on the genre. His tales form a veritable repertoire of the fantastique, subsequently adapted by other authors and in other arts (opera, ballet, cinema).

=== The French fantastique in the 19th century ===
==== The rise of fantastique in France ====
From the 1830s, Hoffmann's tales were translated into French by Loève-Veimars and met a spectacular success. After Jacques Cazotte's Le Diable amoureux, Nodier was one of the first French writers to write fantastique tales. However, he saw this genre as nothing more than a new way of writing marvellous stories; for him, fantastique was a pretext for dreaming and fantasy. In fact, he wrote a study on the fantastique, which shows that for Nodier the line between the marvellous and the fantastique is quite blurred. Populated by ghosts, vampires and the undead, his texts nevertheless possess the hallmarks of the fantastique: ambiguity, uncertainty and disquiet. His best-known tales are Smarra ou les démons de la nuit [Smarra, or The Demons Of The Night] (1821), a series of terrifying dream-based tales, Trilby ou le lutin d'argail (1822), La Fée aux miettes (1832). In this last work, a young carpenter is devoted to the eponymous Fairy, who may be the legendary Queen of Sheba. In order to restore her to her true form, he searches for the magical Singing Mandragore.

Then several of the greatest names in French literature stated to write in this genre. Honoré de Balzac, author of a dozen fairy tales and three fantastique novels, was also influenced by Hoffmann. Apart from L'Élixir de longue vie (1830) and Melmoth réconcilié (1835), his main fantastique work is La Peau de chagrin (1831), in which the main character has made a pact with the Devil: he buys a skin of sorrow that has the power to grant all his wishes but which, symbolising his life, shrinks every time he uses it. Despite the fantastique component, this novel is rooted in realism: Balzac uses description to paint the sights of Paris; he brings in the psychology and social situation of his characters. However, Balzac's fantastique work is not conceived as an end in itself. At the very least, Balzac does not seek to frighten or surprise the reader, and does not involve vampires or werewolves of any kind. Rather, it is a work of reflection, set within the framework of the Comédie humaine. Through the allegorical power of his characters and situations, Balzac is above all writing philosophical tales. We can mention as well Falthurne (1820) by Honoré de Balzac, a novel about a virgin prophetess who knows occult secrets that date back to Ancient Mesopotamia. Also of note by Balzac: Le Centenaire [The Centenarian], about a man seeking higher dimensions, the aptly named La Recherche de l'Absolu [The Search For The Absolute] (1834), whose hero is an alchemist, and Melmoth Réconcilié [Melmoth Reconciled] (1835).

A great admirer of Hoffmann, Théophile Gautier is a key writer of fantastique literature. Inhabited by fantastique and the desire to escape, his tales are among the most accomplished in terms of storytelling technique. Gautier excels at keeping the reader guessing throughout his stories, and surprising them at the punch line. He wrote a number of masterpieces that regularly feature in anthologies devoted to the fantastique, such as La Cafetière (1831) and La Morte amoureuse (1836). In La Morte Amoureuse, Théophile Gautier told the story of a young priest who falls in love with a beautiful female vampire. In it, the vampire is not a soulless creature, but a loving and erotic woman. Gautier's Avatar (1856) and Spirite (1866) are roman spirites which deal with the theme of life after death.

Prosper Mérimée wrote only a very small number of fantastique works (a few short stories at most), but they are of the highest quality. La Vénus d'Ille (1837), in particular, is one of the most famous short stories in the genre: it features a pagan statue that comes to life and kills a young groom on his wedding night. Lokis and Vision de Charles XI are also among his successes. Mérimée also translated Pushkin's "The Queen of Spades", and published a study on Nicholas Gogol, the master of Russian fantastique.

Guy de Maupassant is clearly one of the greatest authors of fantastique literature. His work is marked by realism, the genre in which he built his reputation, and is firmly rooted in everyday life. His recurring themes are fear, anxiety and, above all, madness, which he fell into shortly before his death. These themes can be found in his masterpiece, Le Horla (1887). In the form of a diary, the narrator recounts his anxieties caused by the presence of an invisible being. The hesitation is based on the narrator's possible madness. In Maupassant's work, the blend of realism and fantastique is often driven by the madness of one of the protagonists, bringing his distorted vision of the world into the real world. The Horla, a word coined by Maupassant, most likely means "Out there", implying that this invisible being comes from another world. There are two versions of Le Horla by the same author: the second version ends with the main character being committed to a psychiatric hospital.

In 1839, Gérard de Nerval collaborated with Alexandre Dumas on L'Alchimiste [The Alchemist]. Mentally unhinged after a lover's death, Nerval developed an interest in mystical beliefs, especially in his book Les Illuminés. After writing fantastique texts influenced by the German Romanticism of Goethe and Hoffmann, Gérard de Nerval wrote a major work, Aurélia (1855), in a more poetic and personal style. He also wrote another text in a similar style, La Pandora (1854).

Other notable works at that time include:

- Cyprien Bérard's Lord Rutwen ou les Vampires (1820), which was adapted into a stage play by Charles Nodier the same year, and starred John William Polidori's vampire character Lord Ruthven.
- The three-volume La Vampire (1825) by Étienne-Léon de Lamothe-Langon which tells the story of a young Napoleonic army officer who bring his Hungarian fiancée home to later discover that she is a vampire, and Le Diable [The Devil] (1832) featuring the charismatic, evil Chevalier Draxel.
- Rustic legends of the Alsace were also the main source of inspiration of Émile Erckmann and Alexandre Chatrian, a writing team who signed their works Erckmann-Chatrian. Their first collection, Les Contes Fantastiques [Fantastic Tales] (1847), includes the classic short story L'Araignée Crabe [The Crab-Spider], about a blood-sucking lake monster with the body of a spider and the head of a man.
- Alexandre Dumas, père was finely attuned to the literary marketplace. The success of Hoffmann's Tales and of the Thousand And One Nights influenced him to write Les Mille et Un Fantômes [A Thousand And One Ghosts] (1849), an anthology of macabre tales. Dumas wrote his own version of Lord Ruthwen in Le Vampire (1851). Finally, in 1857, he penned one of the first modern werewolf stories, Le Meneur de Loups [The Leader Of Wolves].
- Edgar Quinet wrote Ahasvérus (1833), a lengthy and sophisticated poetic narrative about the Wandering Jew.
- Eugène Sue's own Wandering Jew narrative, Le Juif Errant [The Wandering Jew], was serialized in 1844–45. Dumas' Isaac Laquedem appeared in 1853.
- Paul Féval, père was one of the most important fantastique writers of the period with Les Revenants [Revenants] (1853), La Fille du Juif Errant [The Daughter Of The Wandering Jew] (1864), the macabre La Vampire [The Vampire Countess] (1867), and La Ville Vampire [The Vampire City] (1874) which parodied Ann Radcliffe, making her the book's fictional heroine.

==== Fin de siècle symbolism and fantastique ====
The end of the 19th century saw the rise of so-called "decadent" literature, whose favourite themes were cruelty, vice and perversity. In the wake of works such as Joris-Karl Huysmans' À rebours [Against Nature] (1884), Là-Bas [Down There] (1891) and Jules Barbey d'Aurevilly's Les Diaboliques, fantastique was no longer an end in itself, but a means of conveying a provocation, a denunciation or an aesthetic desire. During this period, there were no longer any "fantastique writers", but many authors who wrote a few fantastique texts. Tales became more mannered, descriptions became richer, and exoticism and eroticism became important elements. Finally, the fantastique tale provided an opportunity for social criticism, often directed against bourgeois materialism, as in Villiers de L'Isle-Adam's Contes cruels [Cruel Tales] (1883) and Tribulat Bonhomet (1887). The decadent Symbolists also made extensive use of fantastique in their tales, which were not far removed from fable and allegory.

Léon Bloy wrote two collections of stories, Sueurs de sang (1893) and Histoires désobligeantes (1894). Although not all his stories are fantastique, they do have a strange or supernatural ring to them. Writing in an incendiary style, Bloy was determined to shock his readers with the cruelty of his stories. Another writer who made anything cruel, unhealthy or sordid his favourite source of inspiration was Jean Lorrain, author of Monsieur de Phocas, one of the key works of fin de siècle literature. His many fantastique tales can be found in several collections, the best of which is undoubtedly Histoires de masques (1900). We can mention as well Buveurs d'Âmes [Soul Drinkers] (1893), "Les contes d'un buveur d'éther" and the kabbalistic novel La Mandragore (1899).

The Symbolist author Marcel Schwob, hardly unmoved to the deleterious atmosphere of decadent works, managed to reconcile this aesthetic with the vein of the fantastic. Using the marvellous and the power of allegory, he wrote two collections of tales, Cœur Double (1891) and Le Roi au masque d'or (1892). The collection Histoires magiques (1894) by another symbolist writer, Rémy de Gourmont, in which the influence of Villiers de L'Isle-Adam is undeniable, is also worth mentioning, and is the only one by its author to contain fantastique tales.

In 1919, Henri de Régnier wrote a collection of three important fantastique stories, Histoires incertaines, whose aesthetic is directly influenced by fin de siècle literature.

Other notable works of this category include:

- Octave Mirbeau's sadistic and mean-spirited tales of murders, cannibalism and ghostly revenge collected in Le Jardin des Supplices [Torture Garden] (1899).
- Also from Belgium, Franz Hellens, a precursor of the surrealists, displayed a lyrical, romantic approach to fantasy. Les Hors-le-Vent [The Out-Wind] (1909) and Nocturnal (1919) explored into the land of dreams, which he dubbed the "second life", while his novel Mélusine (1920) was generally considered a pre-surrealist novel.

=== Victorian England ===
Victorian England produced few fantastique writers in the strict sense of the term, as the subtle ambiguities inherent in the genre found little echo in the English literary tradition. Thomas de Quincey's short stories, for example, are more clearly in the tradition of the Gothic novel than that of fantastique. The Irishman Sheridan Le Fanu wrote Carmilla (1871), a Gothic novel whose originality lies in the character of the homosexual female vampire. It inspired the famous Dracula by his compatriot Bram Stoker (1897), the undisputed masterpiece of vampire stories. Oscar Wilde also wrote one of the most famous English language fantastique novels, The Portrait of Dorian Gray (1891), in which the main character sees his portrait age and take on every mark of his vices, while he possesses eternal youth and indulges in every excess. In this text, Wilde develops his thoughts on aestheticism and depicts the conflict between physical and moral decay. Sensuality and homosexuality also permeate the work. Far beyond the realm of fantastique, this novel had a strong influence on French literature, particularly on decadent writers. Oscar Wilde also wrote a parody of a ghost story, The Canterville Ghost (1887).

One British writer, Arthur Llewelyn Jones, also known as Arthur Machen, was born on 3 March 1863 in Wales and died on 15 December 1947 (aged 84) in England. He is particularly associated with fantastique literature, notably with his first novel, The Great God Pan (1894). The Anglo-American writer Henry James regularly tackled fantastique in the course of his literary career, and more specifically ghost stories. His most accomplished work is The Nutcracker (1898), a benchmark in the art of vacillating between rational and irrational explanations. James's allusive style leads the reader to doubt each of the protagonists in turn, so that the ultimate truth of the story is not revealed at the end; that choice is left to the reader. This book is also remarkable for the ghostly nature of its characters.

Other famous writers have penned some fantastique texts, including Robert Louis Stevenson (Dr Jeckyll and Mr Hyde, "Markheim", "Olalla") and Rudyard Kipling.

This period also saw the birth of new genres of popular literature close to the fantastique: mystery fiction with Wilkie Collins, science fiction with H. G. Wells and Mary Shelley, and fantasy with William Morris and George MacDonald.

=== American fantastique ===
At its birth in the early 19th century, American literature was strongly influenced by the English Gothic novel and fantastique. Nathaniel Hawthorne, then Washington Irving and above all Edgar Allan Poe also made the short story and the tale their preferred forms of expression. Poe also played a special role in developing his own aesthetic theory. He was also one of the pioneers of science fiction and detective fiction. Washington Irving, one of the first great American writers, wrote many tales that were closer to legend than to the supernatural strictly speaking. He is characterised by his realism and ironic tone. His best-known collection is the Sketch Book (1819), which contains the tale of Rip Van Winckle, one of the first two truly original American works of fantastique, along with William Austin's Peter Rugh, the Missing (1824).

Nathaniel Hawthorne wrote a number of works involving the supernatural. They are marked by oppression in Puritan America, and have the recurring theme of curses, in reference to legends of witchcraft. Although fantastique occupies little space in his abundant output, Francis Marion Crawford is the author of a collection of high quality in the genre, Wandering Ghosts (1891). While drawing on this tradition, H. P. Lovecraft gave it a particular twist, closer to horror. Lovecraft went on to inspire many twentieth-century authors, including Stephen King.

=== Russian fantastique ===
Alexander Pushkin introduced the fantastique genre to Russia with his famous short story The Queen of Spades (1834). From then on, fantastique became a favourite genre in Russian literature, finding its themes in folk tales and legends. Works such as Aleksey Konstantinovich Tolstoy's The Family of Vourdalak and Nikolai Gogol's The Frightful Vengeance are examples of fantastique that is close to the marvellous, a character of its own in realist works marked by deep concern and greater sincerity than the literary masterpieces that emerged from the fantastique "craze", particularly in France. Such is the case with Gogol's "The Cloak" and Nikolai Leskov's The White Eagle. This realism was to be found much later in Andrei Biely's novel Petersburg and in Fyodor Sologub's The Petty Demon.

Encouraged by Pushkin, Nicholai Gogol published some fantastique tales, the most famous of which are "The Nose" and The Diary of a Madman, published in the collection of Petersburg short stories. These stories introduced a rather profound change in the nature of the fantastique tradition. Fear played a negligible role, but the absurd and the grotesque became an essential element. This new style was emulated in Russia itself: The Double, one of Dostoyevsky's first novels, was directly inspired by Gogol's work.

=== Fantastique in German expressionism ===
The beginning of the 20th century saw the rise of dark, pessimistic fantastique in German-speaking countries. The works published during this period became sources of inspiration for the expressionist cinema that was developing in Germany. Gustav Meyrink (1868-1932) was one of the greatest fantastique writers of the period. A great lover of the occult, he distilled occultist theories in his novels with the aim of initiating his readers. His most famous novel, The Golem (1915), was inspired by the Kabbalah. It depicts a degraded and miserable humanity in the Jewish quarter of Prague. His other major fantastique novel was Walpurgis Night (1917). Its theme is violence and collective madness, and it echoes the butchery of the First World War.

A more controversial figure, Hanns Heinz Ewers is the author of an abundant oeuvre which, although it often veers more towards the uncanny than the fantastique, remains largely in the realm of the supernatural. With a pronounced penchant for the macabre, blood and unhealthy eroticism, his works are intended to be provocative and have often been judged immoral. Ewers is best known for his novel Mandragore. He wrote another significant novel, The Sorcerer's Apprentice (1909), as well as numerous short stories, the best known of which is "The Spider" (1908).

In 1909, the Austrian writer and illustrator Alfred Kubin published a single fantastique novel, The Other Side, which reflects the nightmarish atmosphere of his drawings. This novel, in which dreams and reality form an inextricable skein, is considered by Peter Assman, Kubin's main biographer, to be "an essential step in the development of European fantastique literature".

Other important fantastique works written during this period include Leo Perutz's The Marquis of Bolibar and Alexander Lernet-Holenia's Baron Bagge. It was also during this period that Franz Kafka wrote "The Metamorphosis", often considered to be a fantastique short story.

=== Belgian fantastique ===
The development of a particular kind of fantasy literature in Belgium in the 20th century is a curious but indisputable fact. It is all the more important to mention it because fantastique plays a central role in Belgian literature in general. Belgian fantastique emerged from symbolism and realism at the end of the nineteenth century. Symbolism created an atmosphere conducive to the intrusion of the supernatural, whether through allegory, enchantment or allusiveness. The major work of this movement is Bruges-la-Morte by Georges Rodenbach (1892). Alongside symbolism, a realist and rustic movement developed, whose main representative was Georges Eekhoud. Marked by a realism of excess and hyperbole, his work includes a major collection, Cycles patibulaires (1892).

Two writers helped bring Belgian fantastique to maturity: Franz Hellens and Jean Ray. The former, alternating between symbolism and realism, distinguished himself in a genre that is sometimes described as "magic realism". His main works are Nocturnal (1919) and Les réalités fantastiques (1923). Jean Ray was a true innovator of supernatural literature in the 20th century. He has the particularity of having considered the fantastique genre as a whole, and devoted himself exclusively to it. He began his career as a pulp writer, using a variety of aliases, and had several stories published in Weird Tales. He is the author of an unbridled fantastique whose greatest success is Malpertuis (1943) and he wrote short stories steeped in the rich, mist-shrouded atmosphere of his native Flanders. Finally, Michel de Ghelderode, in addition to his impressive theatrical work, also wrote Sortilèges (1945), a collection of fantastique short stories that is one of the masterpieces of the genre.

=== The French fantastique in the 20th century ===
==== 20th century prior to World War II ====
The confidence displayed by French Society in the early 1900s was sapped by the slaughter of World War I: the Dadaist and Surrealist movements expressed a desire to break violently with the past. In 1924, the André Breton's Manifesto of Surrealism, inspired by Freudian discoveries, challenged the realist attitude, contested the reign of logic and called for imagination and dreams to regain their rights. Breton, however, said little about fantastique. Indeed, the surrealism generally favours the marvellous over the fantastique even if it influenced the genre. A non-literary influence on the fantastique writers was that of Sigmund Freud.

Some of the major contributors of the period include:

- In La Révolte des anges [The Revolt Of The Angels] (1914), Anatole France wrote a startling tale in which the Fallen angel Arcade schemes to organize a new revolt among the fallen angels who are living on Earth, posing as artists.
- Blaise Cendrars openly declared his admiration for Gustave Le Rouge. His La Fin du Monde Filmée par l'Ange [The End Of The World Filmed By An Angel] (1919) and Moravagine (1926) are surrealist novels, the latter named after, and telling the story of, an evil madman whose crimes rival those of Fantômas, a character much appreciated by the Surrealists.
- The Faustian Marguerite de la Nuit [Marguerite Of The Night] (1922), by Pierre Mac Orlan, was also made into a film.
- Jules Supervielle, a writer of Basque descent, incorporated Hispanic vistas and fantasy themes in his novel L'Enfant de la Haute Mer [The Child From The High Sea] (1931).
- Playwright Jean Giraudoux combined tragedy, humor and fantasy in Intermezzo (1937), where a timid ghost revolutionizes a small town, and Ondine (1939) about a water sprite who falls in love with a mortal.
- Julien Gracq's first novel, The Castle of Argol (1938) combined the effects of the roman noir with the poetry of Arthur Rimbaud. The book takes place in a Gormenghast-like castle where the young owner, his friend and the beautiful Heide spend their time playing morbid and decadent games. In 1951, Gracq published the brilliant The Opposing Shore (1951) which won the Prix Goncourt and takes place in the fictional country of Orsenna.

===== Fantastique feuilletons =====
Between the wars, the fantastique catered to the masses by providing cheap entertainment in the form of feuilletons such as Le Journal des Voyages (1877–1947), Lectures Pour Tous (1898–1940) and L'Intrépide (1910–1937) and paperbacks from publishers such as Ollendorff, Méricant, Férenczi and Tallandier. Significant names of the times include:

- Gaston Leroux with La Double Vie de Theophraste Longuet [The Double Life Of Theophraste Longuet] (1903), in which a retired merchant is possessed by the spirit of 18th century French highwayman Cartouche; the Hoffmannesque L'Homme qui a Vu le Diable [The Man Who Saw The Devil] (1908); the classic Le Fantôme de l'Opéra a.k.a. The Phantom of the Opera (1910) and Le Coeur Cambriolé [The Burglared Heart] (1920).
- André de Lorde, nicknamed the "Prince of Terror", a prolific playwright who wrote over one hundred and fifty plays for the Grand Guignol theater, collected in various volumes, including Théâtre d'Épouvante [Theater Of Horror] (1909), Théâtre Rouge [Red Theater] (1922), Les Drames Célèbres du Grand-Guignol [Famous Tragedies Of The Grand-Guignol] (1924) and Théâtre de la Peur [Theater Of Fear] (1924).
- Claude Farrère, the first recipient of the French Prix Goncourt literary award, wrote La Maison des Hommes Vivants [The House Of Living Men] (1911) in which a sect of immortals, founded by the Count of St Germain, steals others' life forces in order to preserve their own immortality.
- One of the most distinctive genre writers of the 1930s, who also blended genres with deceptive facility, was Pierre Véry, whose mystery novels always incorporated surreal or supernatural elements. Some of his works squarely belonged in the fantasy genre, such as Le Pays sans Étoiles [The Starless Country] (1945) and Tout Doit Disparaître le 5 Mai [Everything Must Go On May 5] (1961), a collection of fantastic tales.

==== 20th century post World War II ====
World War II exacted both a huge physical and psychological toll on French culture. France's defeat in 1940, followed by four years of occupation, confronted writers with choices they never before had to face. The discovery of the atom bomb and the Cold War introduced sharp new fears. Mainstream French culture increasingly frowned upon works of imagination and preferred instead to embrace the more naturalistic and political concerns of the existentialists such as Jean-Paul Sartre and Albert Camus. Yet, paradoxically, despite being marginalized by critics and the literary establishment, the fantastique thrived as never before, both in terms of quality and quantity.

Significant foreign influences on French modern fantastique include Franz Kafka, Jorge Luis Borges, H. P. Lovecraft, Dino Buzzati, Julio Cortázar, Vladimir Nabokov and Richard Matheson. Other more recent influences included Stephen King, Clive Barker, none of whom were well known in France before the early 1980s. In Latin America of the 21st century, authors such as César Aira, Roberto Bolaño, José Baroja, Andrés Neuman, Juan Gabriel Vásquez, Jorge Volpi, among others, stand out.

Some of the most interesting authors and works up to the 1980s are:

- Marcel Béalu's fantasy followed the path of Hoffman, Poe and Gérard de Nerval. In his stories, hapless souls became slowly trapped in dream-like realities where inhuman forces held sway. L'Expérience de la Nuit [The Experience Of Night] (1945) deals with the power to see into other dimensions. L'Araignée d'Eau [The Water Spider] (1948) is about an impossible love between a man and a watery creature who slowly turns into a girl.
- Marcel Brion's approach of the supernatural almost always referred to the romantic tradition and the search for a mystical absolute. His most famous collection of stories is Les Escales de la Haute Nuit [The Shore Leaves Of The Deepest Night] (1942).
- André Pieyre de Mandiargues' gift was to make the invisible visible with an implacable sense of logic and an almost maniacal precision. His stories are collected in Le Musée Noir [The Black Museum] (1946) and Soleil des Loups [The Sun Of The Wolves] (1951).
- André Dhôtel used adolescents as protagonists to make us experience wondrous events, always presented in a disturbingly matter-of-fact way, in La Chronique Fabuleuse [The Fabulous Chronicle] (1955) and Le Pays où l'on n'arrive Jamais [The Unreachable Country] (1955).
- Noël Devaulx' own brand of fantastique relied of the intrusion of strange and unexplainable into everyday reality. His short stories were dubbed "parables without keys." His best collections are L'Auberge Parpillon [The Parpillon Inn] (1945) and Le Pressoir Mystique [The Mystic Press] (1948).
- In 1954, publisher Fleuve Noir launched a dedicated horror imprint, Angoisse, which continued monthly until 1974, publishing a total of 261 horror novels, including books by Marc Agapit, B. R. Bruss, Maurice Limat, Kurt Steiner, André Caroff's Madame Atomos series and Jean-Claude Carrière's series of Frankenstein novels.
- The prolific Claude Seignolle's brand of fantastique was influenced by his "sorcerous childhood" spent in the misty plains of his native Sologne, and a terrifying encounter with the Devil incarnated in a local warlock which he claimed to have experienced at age 15 in 1932. This conferred a real sense of authenticity to Seignolle's books, which were almost devoid of any literary artifices. His major works include La Malvenue [The Illcome] (1952) and the collections Histoires Maléfiques [Maleficent Tales] (1965) and Contes Macabres [Macabre Stories] (1966).

Other notable authors include:

- Michel Bernanos
- Jean-Louis Bouquet
- Serge Brussolo
- Christian Charrière
- Georges-Olivier Châteaureynaud
- Lise Deharme
- Alain Dorémieux
- Gérard Prévot
- Jacques Sadoul
- Marcel Schneider
- Jacques Sternberg
- Roland Topor

== Analysis ==
For Todorov, the fantastique requires the fulfillment of three conditions. First, the text must oblige the reader to consider the world of the characters as a world of living persons and to hesitate between a natural or supernatural explanation of the events described. Second, this hesitation may also be experienced by a character; thus the reader's role is so to speak entrusted to a character, and at the same time the hesitation is represented, it becomes one of the themes of the work—in the case of naive reading, the actual reader identifies himself with the character. Third, the reader must adopt a certain attitude with regard to the text: he will reject allegorical as well as "poetic" interpretations. The fantastique also explores three conditions; reader’s hesitation, hesitation may be felt by another character, and the reader must have a certain mindset when reading the text. There is also a system to the fantastique that he explores that uses three properties. The utterance which discusses the use of figurative discourse, how everything figurative is taken in a literal sense. The supernatural begins to exist within the fantastique due to exaggeration, figurative expression being taken literal, and how the supernatural originates from the rhetorical figure. Leading into the second property, the act of uttering. In this property, it is most connected to the narrator of the story and the idea (discourse-wise) is that the narrator/character must pass this "test of truth". The narrator is someone who cannot "lie"; they explain the supernatural (marvelous), but doubt in what they say creates the fantastique. The final property is the syntactic aspect. Penzoldt’s theory is what focuses on this property the most.

The structure of the ideal ghost story may be represented as a rising line which leads to the cumulating point... Which is obviously the appearance of the ghost. Most authors try to achieve a certain gradation in their assent to this culmination, first speaking vaguely, then more and more directly.

The fantastique can also represent dreams and wakefulness where the character or reader hesitates as to what is reality or what is a dream. Again the fantastic is found in this hesitation—once it is decided the fantastique ends.

== Examples ==
=== In literary works ===
- Many of Edgar Allan Poe's short works
- Henry James, The Turn of the Screw – seen by Todorov as one of the few examples of pure Fantastique
- Nikolai Gogol's "The Nose"
- Mikhail Bulgakov
- Algernon Blackwood's The Willows and The Wendigo
- Sheridan Le Fanu's works in In a Glass Darkly
- E.T.A. Hoffmann's works, notably "The Sandman", "The Golden Flower Pot", and "The Nutcracker and the King of Mice"
- Gérard de Nerval's "Aurelia"
- Guy de Maupassant's "The Horla"
- Ambrose Bierce's "The Death of Halpin Frayser"
- Adolfo Bioy Casares's The Invention of Morel
- R.L. Stevenson's Strange Case of Dr Jekyll and Mr Hyde
- Bram Stoker's Dracula
- Oscar Wilde's The Picture of Dorian Gray
- Franz Kafka's The Metamorphosis
- Arthur Machen's The Great God Pan
- Nathaniel Hawthorne's The House of the Seven Gables and "The Birth-Mark"
- H.G. Wells's The Island of Doctor Moreau
- Short stories in Vernon Lee's Hauntings

== See also ==
- Fantastic
- Fantasy
- Horror
- Gothic Novel
- Roman noir
- Magic realism

== Bibliography ==
- Jean-Baptiste Baronian, Panorama de la littérature fantastique de langue française, Stock, 1978.
- Roger Bozzetto, L’Obscur objet d’un savoir, fantastique et science-fiction, deux littératures de l’imaginaire, Aix-Marseille, Université de Provence, 1992.
- Marcel Brion, Art fantastique, Albin Michel, 1989.
- Pierre Brunel et Juliette Vion-Dury (dir.), Dictionnaire des mythes du fantastique, Limoges, PULIM, 2003, 297 p., ISBN 2-84287-276-2, online
- Roger Caillois, De la féerie à la science-fiction, preface of Anthologie du fantastique, Gallimard, 1966.
- Pierre-Georges Castex, Le conte fantastique en France de Nodier à Maupassant, José Corti, 1951.
- Alain Chareyre-Méjan, Le réel et le fantastique, L'Harmattan, 1999.
- Jean Fabre, Le Miroir de sorcière : Essai sur la littérature fantastique, José Corti, 1992 ISBN 2714304494.
- Jacques Finné, La Littérature fantastique, Bruxelles, Éditions de l'Université de Bruxelles, 1980.
- Jacques Finné, Panorama de la littérature fantastique américaine, Dinan, Terre de Brume, 2018.
- Denis Labbé et Gilbert Millet, Le Fantastique, Belin, 2005.
- Jean Le Guennec :
  - Raison et déraison dans le récit fantastique, l’Harmattan, 2003.
  - États de l’inconscient dans le récit fantastique, l’Harmattan, 2002.
- Éric Lysøe :
  - Littératures fantastiques. Belgique, terre de l'étrange, Labor, 2003.
  - Les Kermesses de l'étrange, Nizet, 1993.
  - « Pour une théorie générale du fantastique », Colloquium Helveticum, No. 33, 2002 [2003], p. 37-66.
  - Preface et notes of Voyage à Visbecq, fantastique novel of 1794 written by an anonymous Belgian writer, Anacharsis, 2007 .
- Joël Malrieu, Le Fantastique, Hachette, Paris, 1992.
- Max Milner, La Fantasmagorie, essai sur l’optique fantastique, PUF, Paris, 1982.
- Mario Praz :
  - Le Pacte avec le serpent, 3 volumes, Christian Bourgois, 1989, 1990, 1991.
  - La Chair, la Mort et le Diable : Le romantisme noir, Gallimard/Tel, 1998.
- Anne Richter, Le Fantastique féminin, un art sauvage, essai, L'Âge d'Homme, Lausanne, 2011.
- Anne Richter, Le Fantastique féminin, d'Ann Radcliffe à Patricia Highsmith, anthologie, Complexe, Bruxelles, 1995.
- Giovanni Papini, Concerto fantastique : toutes les nouvelles. Éditions l'Âge d'Homme, 2010.
- Jean-Luc Steinmetz, La littérature fantastique, Presses Universitaires de France, 1960.
- Tzvetan Todorov, Introduction à la littérature fantastique, Seuil, 1971.
- Louis Vax :
  - La séduction de l'étrange. Étude sur la littérature fantastique, Presses Universitaires de France, 1964.
  - L'art et la littérature fantastique, Presses Universitaires de France, 1960.
- Sous la direction de Valérie Tritter, L'encyclopédie du fantastique, Éditions Ellipses, 2010.
- Jad Hatem, La Genèse du monde fantastique en littérature, Bucarest, Zeta Books, 2008.
- François Thirion, De l'objet-piège à la liberté de l'imaginaire, CSIPP, 2012.
- French Science Fiction, Fantasy, Horror and Pulp Fiction by Jean-Marc Lofficier & Randy Lofficier ISBN 0-7864-0596-1.
