= The Centipede's Dilemma =

Tendency to misexecute routinized tasks if one tries to execute them consciously

"The Centipede's Dilemma" is a short poem that has lent its name to a psychological effect called the centipede effect or centipede syndrome. The centipede effect occurs when a normally automatic or unconscious activity is disrupted by consciousness of it or reflection on it. For example, a golfer thinking too closely about their swing or someone thinking too much about how they knot their tie may find their performance of the task impaired. The effect is also known as hyperreflection or Humphrey's law after English psychologist George Humphrey (1889–1966), who propounded it in 1923. As he wrote of the poem, "This is a most psychological rhyme. It contains a profound truth which is illustrated daily in the lives of all of us". The effect is the reverse of a solvitur ambulando.

== Poem ==
The short poem is usually attributed to Katherine Craster (1841–1874) and is said to have appeared in her 1871 collection Pinafore Poems. One documented early appearance of the poem is in an unsigned essay, "The Grievance of Being Over-Estimated", published in The Spectator on 20 August 1881. The essay was reprinted the following month in Littell's Living Age.

On May 23, 1889, the poem appeared in an article by British zoologist Ray Lankester, published in the scientific journal Nature, which discussed the work of photographer Eadweard Muybridge in capturing the motion of animals: "For my own part," wrote Lankester, "I should greatly like to apply Mr. Muybridge's cameras, or a similar set of batteries, to the investigation of a phenomenon more puzzling even than that of 'the galloping horse'. I allude to the problem of 'the running centipede'". Lankester finished the article on a fanciful note by imagining the "disastrous results in the way of perplexity" that could result from such an investigation, quoting the poem and mentioning that the author was unknown to him or to the friend who sent it to him. It has since been variously attributed to specific authors, but without convincing evidence, and often appears under the title "The Centipede's Dilemma".

The version in the article is:

A centipede was happy – quite!
Until a toad in fun
Said, "Pray, which leg moves after which?"
This raised her doubts to such a pitch,
She fell exhausted in the ditch
Not knowing how to run.

== In psychology and philosophy ==
English psychologist George Humphrey (1889–1966) referred to the tale in his 1923 book The Story of Man's Mind: "No man skilled at a trade needs to put his constant attention on the routine work", he wrote. "If he does, the job is apt to be spoiled". He went on to recount the centipede's story, commenting, "This is a most psychological rhyme. It contains a profound truth which is illustrated daily in the lives of all of us, for exactly the same thing happens if we pay conscious attention to any well-formed habit, such as walking". Thus, his eponymous "Humphrey's law" states that once a task has become automatized, conscious thought about the task, while performing it, impairs performance. Whereas habit diminishes and then eliminates the attention required for routine tasks, this automaticity is disrupted by attention to a normally unconscious competence.

In 1994, philosopher Karl Popper referred to the centipede effect in his book Knowledge and the Body-Mind Problem: In Defence of Interaction: "if we have learnt certain movements so that they have sunk below the level of conscious control, then if we try to follow them consciously, we very often interfere with them so badly that we stop them". He gives the example of violinist Adolf Busch, who was asked by fellow violinist Bronisław Huberman how he played a certain passage of Beethoven's violin concerto. Busch told Huberman that it was quite simple, and then found that he could no longer play the passage.

In 1996, psychiatric psychoanalyst Theo L. Dorpat compares questions and interventions irrelevant to the patient's current thought process during psychotherapy in his book Gaslighting to "the story of the centipede who became disorganized and unable to walk after he was asked, 'What's wrong with your 34th left foot?'."

== Cultural references ==
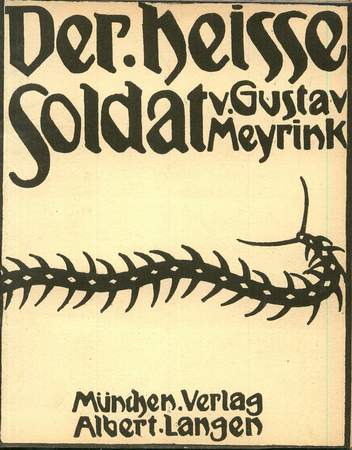
Cover of The Hot Soldier and Other Stories by Gustav Meyrink

In 1903, Simplicissimus magazine printed an adaptation of the story "The Curse of The Toad" (Der Fluch der Kröte) by the Austrian author Gustav Meyrink. The fable was also published in Meyrink's 1903 collection of tales, The Hot Soldier and Other Stories.

Spider Robinson's short story "The Centipede's Dilemma", one in his story-sequence book "Callahan's Crosstime Saloon", concerns a psychic who uses instinctive telekinetic powers to cheat at darts, and is foiled when another character triggers hyperreflection in him.

== See also ==
- Analysis paralysis
- Yips
