= Paul Leppin =

Czech writer

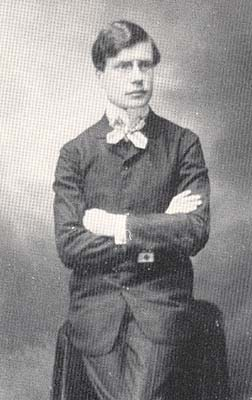
Paul Leppin

Paul Leppin (27 November 1878, Prague (Prag, Praha), Royal Bohemia, Imp.&R. Austria – 10 April 1945, Prague, Bohemia, Bohemia & Moravia/3rd Czechoslovakia) was a 20th-century Bohemian writer of the German language, who was born and lived in Prague.

Although he wrote in German, he was in close contact with Czech literature. He translated Czech books and wrote articles on Czech literature. He was also an editor of two literary periodicals, Frühling and Wir.

== Work ==
- Die Türe des Lebens, (The Doors of Life) 1901
- Severins Gang in die Finsternis, (Severin's Journey into the Dark) 1914
- Das Paradies der Anderen, (Others' Paradise) 1922
- Daniel Jesus, 1905
- Blaugast, posthumously

== English translations ==
- Blaugast: A Novel of Decline, translated from the German by Cynthia Klima, Prague, Twisted Spoon Press, 2007, ISBN 80-86264-23-8
- Severin's journey into the dark, translated from the German by Kevin Blahut, Prague, Twisted Spoon Press, 1993, ISBN 80-901257-2-7
- Others' paradise, translated from the German by Stephanie Howard and Amy R. Nestor, Prague, Twisted Spoon Press, 1995, 2003, ISBN 978-80-86264-07-3

== See also ==
- German-language literature in Prague
- Victor Hadwiger
- Gustav Meyrink
- Richard Dehmel
- Else Lasker-Schüler
- Hugo Steiner-Prag
- Camill Hoffmann
- Oskar Wiener
- Richard Teschner
- Jiří Karásek ze Lvovic
- Rainer Maria Rilke
- Stefan Zweig
