= White Dominican (disambiguation) =

White Dominican may refer to:

- White Dominicans (Dominican Republic)
- White Dominicans (Dominica)
- The White Dominican, a 1921 novel by Gustav Meyrink
