= The Angel of the West Window =

1927 novel by Gustav Meyrink

- Author: Gustav Meyrink
- Original title: Der Engel vom westlichen Fenster
- Language: German
- Publication date: 1927

The Angel of the West Window is a weird fiction novel written in 1927 by Gustav Meyrink (original German title: Der Engel vom westlichen Fenster) steeped in alchemical, hermetic, occult and mystical imagery and ideas interweaving the life of the Elizabethan Magus Dr John Dee with that of a fictional modern descendant, Baron Mueller.

The story is narrated by Baron Mueller, an Austrian of British descent living in Austria in the early part of the 20th century.

== Plot summary ==
At the beginning of the novel, Mueller is given the possessions of a cousin, John Roger, who has recently died. Among them he finds the personal diaries of Dr John Dee, the Elizabethan magus, astrologer, and alchemist who served in the court of Queen Elizabeth I and was an ancestor of both Roger and the Baron.

As the Baron reads the diaries, which deal with Dee's discovery of his special destiny as a Magus, his efforts to find the secret of immortality contained in the Philosopher's Stone and guide the future of England and his conversations with the Green Angel through the mediumship of the confidence trickster Edward Kelley, he realises not only that he is a descendant of Dee but may even be the reincarnated spirit of Dee himself.

The Baron begins to suspect that the various people around him are also the reincarnated spirits of those who had played a crucial part in Dee's adventures - his housekeeper may be Dee's wife, Jane, his Russian acquaintance, Lipotin, may be the mysterious 16th century Muscovite Mascee, etc. Mueller finds himself the guardian of the Spear of Hywel Dda, another former possession of his ancestor and part of the quest to prevent the succubus-like figure of Black Isaïs from gaining control of it, thus completing the work Dee only partly managed to achieve.

As the book ends, Mueller vanquishes Isaïs in her form as the Princess Shotokalungin and becomes a Man of the Rose, part of a group of humans who have become immortal through their spiritual strivings whose task is to help mankind develop and grow (a concept similar to that of ascended masters or Secret Chiefs).

== Major themes ==
Meyrink interweaves the two narratives into a complex and multilayered exploration of a host of occult and esoteric ideas: reincarnation, alchemy, the Hieros Gamos, paganism and Christianity, Tantra, scrying, mediumship and the search for human transcendence and immortality.

Highly complex, often confusing, but also highly atmospheric, The Angel Of The West Window could be described as an occult thriller, mixing melodrama and elements of Gothic horror with exploration of some of the deepest occult and esoteric mysteries of the human soul.

The last novel Meyrink wrote before he died, The Angel Of The West Window is regarded as, if not his most famous work (a claim usually made for his novel the Golem), certainly his most ambitious and multi-layered.

== See also ==
- Alchemy
- Dr John Dee
- Gustav Meyrink
- Occult
- Reincarnation
