= Wasserburg am Inn =

- Town
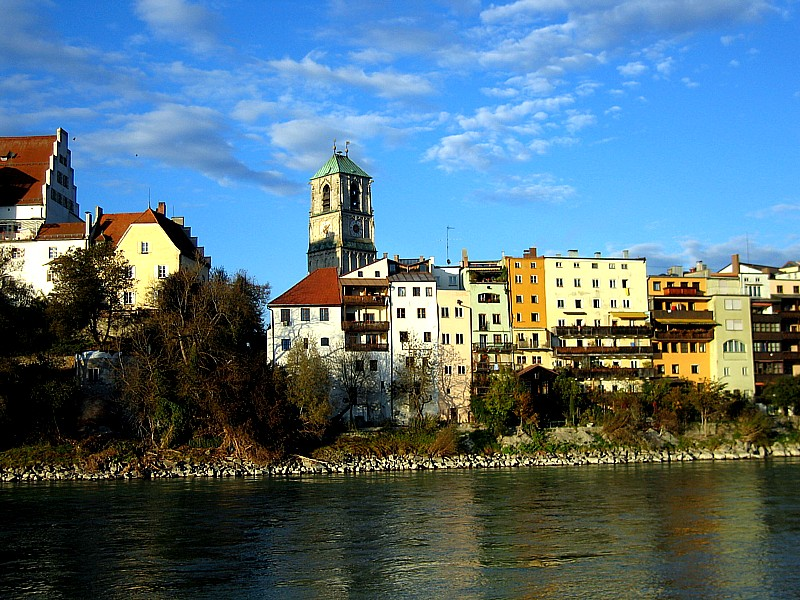
- Wasserburg am Inn

- Coat of arms

- Location of Wasserburg am Inn within Rosenheim district
- Interactive map of Wasserburg am Inn
- Location within Germany Location within Bavaria
- Coordinates: 48°03.7′N 12°14.0′E
- Country: Germany
- State: Bavaria
- Admin. region: Oberbayern
- District: Rosenheim

Government
  - Mayor (2020–26): Michael Kölbl (SPD)

Area
  - Total: 18.8 km^{2} (7.3 sq mi)
- Elevation: 427 m (1,401 ft)

Population (2025-12-31)
  - Total: 12,371
  - Density: 658/km^{2} (1,700/sq mi)
- Time zone: UTC+01:00 (CET)
  - Summer (DST): UTC+02:00 (CEST)
- Postal codes: 83512
- Dialling codes: 08071
- Vehicle registration: RO, AIB, WS
- Website: www.wasserburg.de

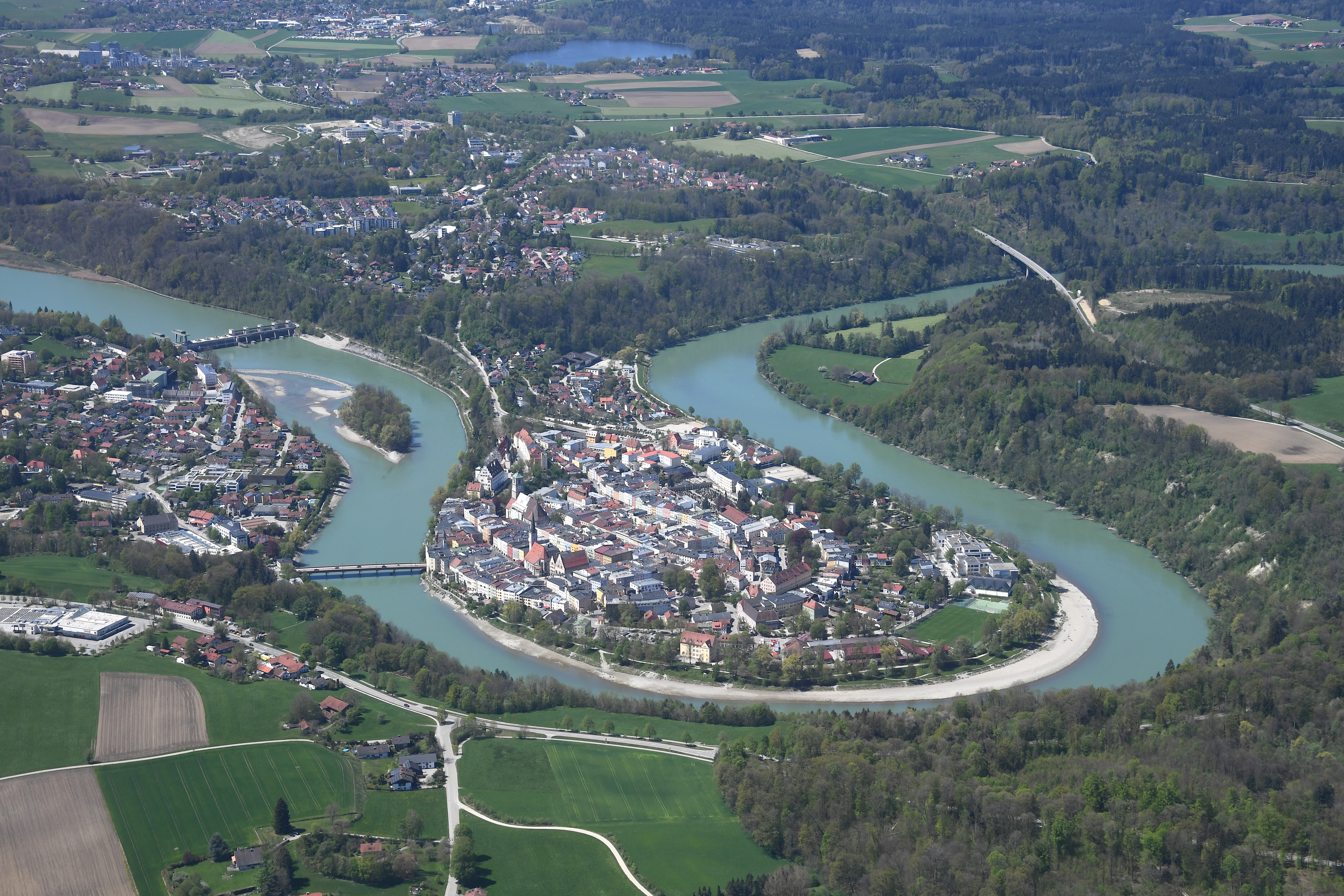
Aerial image of Wasserburg am Inn

Wasserburg am Inn (German pronunciation: [ˈvasɐbʊʁk ʔam ˈʔɪn], lit. 'Wasserburg on the Inn'; Central Bavarian: Wassabuag am Inn) is a town in Rosenheim district in Upper Bavaria, Germany. The historic centre is a peninsula formed by the meandering river Inn. Many Medieval structures remain intact, giving the city a unique view.

== Villages ==
Wasserburg consists of 22 Ortsteile:

- Attel
- Attlerau
- Au
- Edgarten
- Elend
- Gabersee
- Gern
- Heberthal
- Kobl
- Kornberg
- Kroit
- Langwiederberg
- Limburg
- Osterwies
- Reisach
- Reitmehring
- Rottmoos
- Seewies
- Staudham
- Viehhausen
- Wasserburg am Inn (main part/center)
- Weikertsham

== History ==
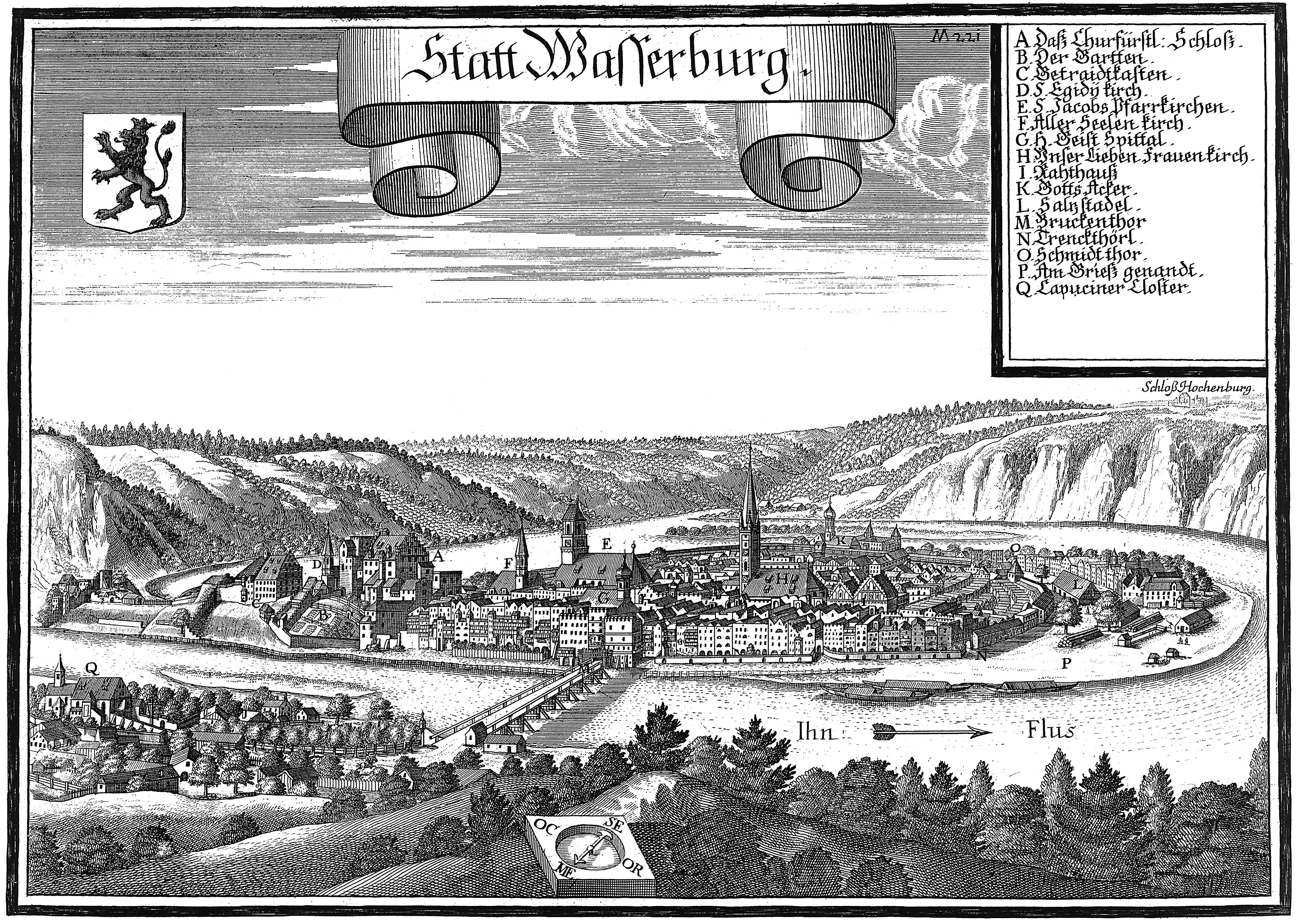
Engraving by Michael Wening in Topographia Bavariae around 1700

The town was claimed to have been first mentioned in a document (now considered to be a fake) in 1137, when Hallgraf Engelbert moved his residence from the nearby castle Limburg to his "Wasserburg" (Water Castle). It is one of the most historic towns of Old Bavaria – somewhat older than Munich, continually fought over by the Bavarian nobility and, up to the 16th century, on an equal footing with larger cities. The privileges afforded by this enabled the salt trade to flourish right into the 19th century. At the junction of the main overland route with the main water route, Wasserburg became the most important trade centre with the Balkans, Austria and Italy, a means of attaining power and wealth for the shipping owners and merchants.

In the early days, Wasserburg was an important hub in the salt trade. Its bridge was the only possibility to cross the river Inn for 30 km in both directions. On its shore the salt, mined in Berchtesgaden or produced in the Saline (saltern) at Bad Reichenhall and shipped from there by cart, could be loaded on ships travelling on the Inn River. Up to the 17th century Wasserburg was used as the port of the capital Munich.

Up until 1972, when it was merged with the district Rosenheim, Wasserburg was a district capital on its own.

Historical population
Year	Pop.	±%
1 December 1840	2,782	—
1 December 1871	3,852	+38.5%
1 December 1900	5,146	+33.6%
16 June 1925	6,287	+22.2%
17 May 1939	6,900	+9.8%
13 September	7,930	+14.9%
6 June 1961	9,388	+18.4%
27 May 1970	10,087	+7.4%
25 May 1987	9,067	−10.1%
9 May 2011	12,127	+33.7%

== In literature ==
Gustav Meyrink's most esoteric novel The White Dominican (German: Der weiße Dominikaner) is set in a mystical version of Wasserburg.
