= The Green Face =

1916 novel

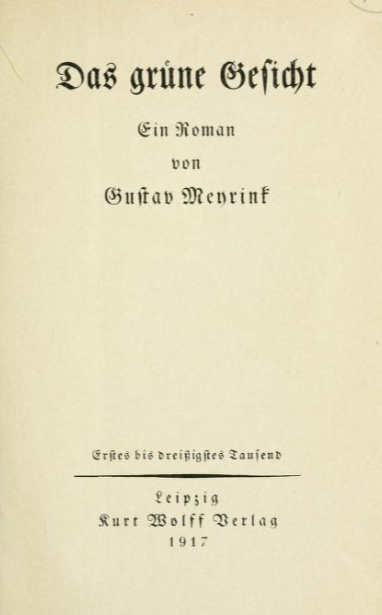
- Title page in original German language, Das grüne Gesicht (1917)
- Author: Gustav Meyrink
- Language: German
- Genre: Fiction
- Published: 1916
- Publication place: Austria
- Pages: 224

The Green Face (German: Das grüne Gesicht) is a 1916 novel by Gustav Meyrink. The book is set in Amsterdam and opens with a stranger visiting a peculiar magic shop, host to a number of unusual customers. One has a green face, which horrifies and haunts the stranger, so that he attempts to track down the man. Like his previous work The Golem, the book makes use of the Wandering Jew trope.
