= Fantastic =

Fantastic or Fantastik may refer to:

== Music ==
- Fantastic (Toy-Box album)
- Fantastic (Wham! album)
- Fan-Tas-Tic (Vol. 1), an album by Slum Village
- Fantastic, Vol. 2, an album by Slum Village
- Fantastic (EP), an EP by Henry Lau
- "Fantastic" (song), a song by Ami Suzuki
- "Fantastic!", a 1995 song by The Dismemberment Plan from !
- "Fantastic", a 2017 song by Flume featuring Dave Bayley from Skin Companion EP 2
- "Fantastic", a 2024 song by King Princess for the Arcane League of Legends: Season 2 soundtrack album

== Literature ==
- Fantasy, a genre of speculative fiction also known as fantastic literature.
- Fantastique, a genre of writing

== Publications ==
- Fantastic (magazine), a fantasy-fiction magazine published from 1952 to 1980; title revived in the 1990s
- Fantastic (comics), a weekly British comic published by Odhams Press under the Power Comics imprint

== Other uses ==
- Fantastic art, a non-realistic genre
- Fantastic (TV channel), a defunct Polish television channel
- Fantastic (TV series), a South Korean TV series

== See also ==
- Fantastik, a brand of cleaning products
- Light Fantastic (disambiguation)
- Mir Fantastiki, a Russian sci-fi and fantasy magazine
- Mister Fantastic, a member of the Fantastic Four in Marvel Comics
- The Fantasticks, an Off-Broadway musical play
