= Avatar (novel) =

19th century short story by French writer Théophile Gautier

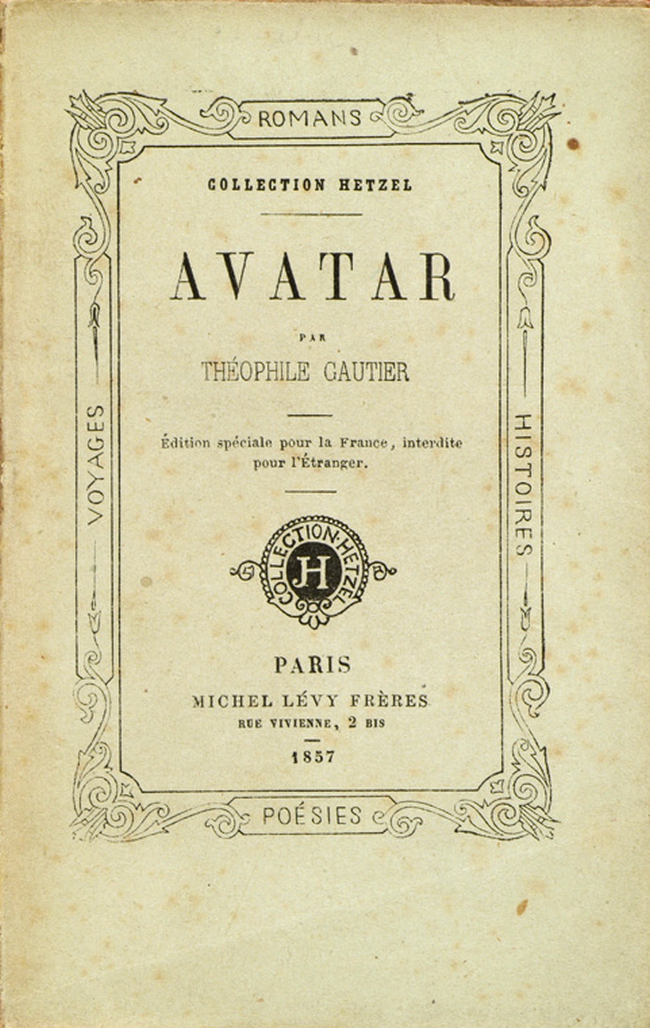
- Author: Théophile Gautier
- Language: French
- Genre: Fantastique, novella
- Publication date: 1856
- Publication place: France
- Media type: Print (newspaper)

Avatar, first published in 1856, is a fantastique novella by French writer Théophile Gautier.

== Plot summary ==
Octave de Saville pines for Lithuanian Countess Prascovie Labinska. Alas, she rejects his advances, and remains faithful to her husband, Count Olaf. Octave slowly drifts towards apathy, and his soul gradually deserts him. Octave's friends and relatives, who fail to understand the source of his illness, resort to a peculiar and rather mysterious physician who spent several years in India leading an ascetic life. The physician, Balthazar Cherbonneau, offers to swap Octave's mind with Olaf's using magic he learned in India. Cherbonneau tricks Olaf while he is visiting and successfully switches Octave's and the count's minds. Prascovie is shaken by what appears to be a change in her husband's personality, sensing Octave's desire for her in her husband's face. Meanwhile, Olaf is confused by the sudden change of bodies. He realizes that someone is impersonating him when he is denied entry to his residence.

Olaf, in Octave's body, challenges Octave to a duel to the death. Unwilling to harm their original bodies, the two men agree to go to Cherbonneau and fix the exchange. Octave, having given up on all hope of ever being loved by Prascovie, does not return to his body. Olaf reunites with his wife. Cherbonneau decides to take over Octave's cadaver, faking his own death.
