= Ian M.L. Hunter =

- Born: 14 October 1927; Dunfermline, Scotland
- Died: 30 August 2004 (aged 76); Edinburgh, Scotland
- Education: University of Edinburgh; University of Oxford
- Known for: Experimental psychology
- Scientific career
- Fields: Psychology
- Workplaces: University of Edinburgh; Keele University
- Thesis: A comparative investigation of generalization processes (1953)
- Doctoral advisor: George Humphrey

Ian Melville Logan Hunter (14 October 1927 – 30 August 2004) was a Scottish experimental psychologist.

== Education and career ==
Hunter was born in Dunfermline in 1927. He attended the University of Edinburgh from which he graduated in 1949 with a first class honours degree in psychology. He proceeded to the University of Oxford where he undertook research supervised by George Humphrey. He obtained his DPhil in 1953 for a thesis entitled A comparative investigation of generalization processes. He returned to the University of Edinburgh as a lecturer and remained there until 1962 when he was appointed the Foundation Professor of Psychology at Keele University. He retired in 1982 and moved back to Edinburgh where he died in 2004.

== Academic work ==
Hunter was an experimental psychologist. His early work at Oxford was on transposition behaviour which led to a number of publications (Hunter, 1952). At Oxford, he also became interested, through his supervisor George Humphrey, in Victor of Aveyron - the feral child who was found in Aveyron, southern France in 1800 (Hunter, 1993; Itard, 1932).

While at Edinburgh he became acquainted with Alexander Aitken, a mathematician who had an amazing memory. Hunter undertook some research on Aitken's memory (Hunter, 1962, 1977). Later, he wrote two popular books on memory which sold several hundred thousand copies (Hunter, 1957, 1964).

== Publications ==
- Hunter, I.M.L. (1952). An experimental investigation of the absolute and relative theories of transposition behaviour in children. British Journal of Psychology, 43, 113-128
- Hunter, I.M.L. (1957). Memory: Facts and Fallacies. London: Penguin.
- Hunter, I.M.L. (1962). An exceptional talent for calculative thinking. British Journal of Psychology, 53, 243–258.
- Hunter, I.M.L. (1964). Memory. London: Penguin.
- Hunter, I.M.L. (1977). An exceptional memory. British Journal of Psychology, 68, 155–164.
- Hunter, I.M.L. (1993). Heritage from the wild boy of Aveyron. Early Child Development and Care, 95, 143–155.
- Itard, J.M.G. (1932). The Wild Boy of Aveyron. Translated by George Humphrey and Muriel Humphrey. New York: Century.
