= George Humphrey (psychologist) =

British philosopher, author, and scientist

- Born: 17 July 1889; Boughton, Kent, England
- Died: 24 April 1966 (aged 76); Cambridge, England
- Education: University of Oxford; Harvard University
- Known for: Experimental psychology
- Spouse(s): Muriel Miller (m. 1918-1955); Berta Hotchberger (m. 1956-1966)
- Awards: Fellow of the Royal Society of Canada; Dominion Fellow of St. John's College, Cambridge
- Scientific career
- Fields: Psychology; Philosophy; Classics
- Workplaces: St. Francis Xavier University; Wesleyan University; Queen's University; University of Oxford
- Thesis: The conditioned reflex in education (1920)
- Doctoral students: Ian M.L. Hunter

George William Humphrey FRSC (17 July 1889 – 24 April 1966) was a British psychologist, author, and philosopher. He was the founder of the Canadian Psychological Association, the first Director of the Institute of Experimental Psychology, and Professor of Psychology at the University of Oxford. Humphrey's research concentrated on behavioral studies such as reinforcement, habituation, and apparent movements, as well as psychophysical topics like audiogenic seizures. He is known for Humphrey's Law.

== Early life ==
George Humphrey was born in the county of Kent, England on 17 July 1889. He was a student of Wilhelm Wundt, who inspired Humphrey's early passion for experimental psychology.

== Education ==
He attended Queen Elizabeth's Grammar School, Faversham from 1901.

Humphrey graduated with honors from the University of Oxford where he studied the classical languages, mathematics, and philosophy. He was given a scholarship to study psychology at the University of Leipzig and worked alongside Wilhelm Wundt in the first psychology laboratory. Humphrey received a PhD in psychology from Harvard University in 1920.

== Career ==
Psychologist Raymond Dodge also impacted Humphrey's work in experimental psychology, as they amicably worked together at Wesleyan University. Being well known for his academic achievement and also highly regarded by his peers, Humphrey was selected by St. John's College at Cambridge to be the first Dominion Fellow of the college's new "Dominion Fellowship," established in 1947, to recognize individuals with a profound commitment to study and scholarship.

== Professional history ==
In 1916, Humphrey traveled to Canada to teach classics at St. Francis Xavier University until 1918. After receiving his doctorate in 1920, he took a job as an assistant professor for four years at Wesleyan University in the United States. Humphrey returned to Canada and was given the position of Charlton Professor in Philosophy at Queen's University from 1924 to 1947. When he arrived at the university, psychology was a relatively new field of study and was included in the Department of Philosophy. He made great strides to further develop this aspect of the department. In 1939, he founded the Canadian Psychological Association and appointed Donald Hebb to be the first instructor in experimental psychology at Queen's. Like other experimental psychologists at the time, he set up his own laboratory to bring the study of experimental psychology to the university. He was named head of the department and added new psychology courses, including graduate courses. Because of Humphrey's contributions, the university began to recognize psychology as being independent from the philosophy department, but wasn't formalized until 1949 after he left. He went on to become the first professor of psychology at his alma mater, University of Oxford, which had just opened a new honors school in psychology, philosophy, and physiology. He prompted the university to establish the Oxford Institute of Experimental Psychology and was named its first director. Humphrey also helped to develop military personnel tests and directed research for the Canadian Army during World War II. In 1956, he retired to Cambridge, England at the age of 67. Though no longer a professor, he continued to give lectures in Germany for the British Embassy.

== Major contributions and works ==
Humphrey's keen interest in human nature was encouraged by his time spent with Wundt. After the birth of his daughter, Humphrey observed the newborn by holding her out a second story window to see if she would respond with fear. He was then inspired to write several publications concerning the behavior of children. His first book, The Story of Man's Mind (1932), advocates the significance of experience by referencing the case of the French feral child, Victor of Aveyron, and later wrote (with his wife Muriel Miller) a 1932 translation of Itard's The Wild Boy of Aveyron.

The Story of Man's Mind covers several schools of psychological thought including behaviorism, Gestalt psychology, and psychoanalysis. With Freud in his prime, Humphrey expressed skepticism about psychoanalytic theory, arguing that the role of sex was grossly overemphasized in the development of children. He also diminished the theory about the unconscious mind, claiming that much of it can be explained by the nature of conditioned reflexes. However, he did cite the existence of unconscious thought processes in Humphrey's Law, which states that automatization of a task (usually in the case of movement) is impaired when a task is performed with conscious effort.

His work on classical conditioning revealed that the context in which a stimulus is presented majorly affects how the subject learns to respond, which he discussed in his second book, The Nature of Learning (1933). This book is considered by Queen's University to be his most important work. It brought attention to the concept of living organisms being "systems" that are regulated by homeostasis, physiologically and psychologically.

In 1951, he wrote Thinking: An Introduction to Its Experimental Psychology, which had considerable success as it provided a written description of all research done on mental problem solving in humans conducted by Otto Selz, the Würzburg School, and other Gestalt psychologists. Their findings largely supported Humphrey's assertion—discussed in his book Directed Thinking (1948)—that a sequence of thoughts is governed by motivation.

Humphrey thought that mental escapism could have great benefits and was healthy within reason. He particularly believed that watching movies helped "soothe the raw nerves" of people living in a post-war era. To him, escapism provided a means of coping with other aspects of everyday life that were overly restrictive, like work.

Under the alternate pen name Donald MacPherson, Humphrey wrote two other books. Go Home Unicorn and Men Are Like Animals were science fiction novels that drew from Freudian psychology and were published pseudonymously in 1935 and 1937, respectively.

== Personal life ==
Humphrey married Muriel Miller in 1918, but after her death in 1955, he remarried the following year to his colleague Berta Hotchberger. He spent the last years of his life in St. John's College at Cambridge, where he was actively involved in the school and surrounded by close friends. Humphrey died after an illness quickly took his life on 24 April 1966. In his honor, Queen's University designated the main building of their department of psychology as Humphrey Hall. His colleagues remembered him as being very friendly, active, and neat, but also tenacious of his opinions.

== Bibliography ==
- The Story of Man's Mind, 1923
- The Nature of Learning in Its Relation to the Living System, 1933
- Go Home, Unicorn, 1935
- Men Are Like Animals, 1937
- Directed Thinking, 1948
- Thinking: An Introduction to its Experimental Psychology, 1951
- Social Psychology through Experiment as a co-editor, 1963
- Psychology through Experiment as a co-editor, 1963
- The Chemistry of Thought with R.V. Coxon, 1963
