= Hugo Steiner-Prag =

German illustrator and teacher (1880–1945)

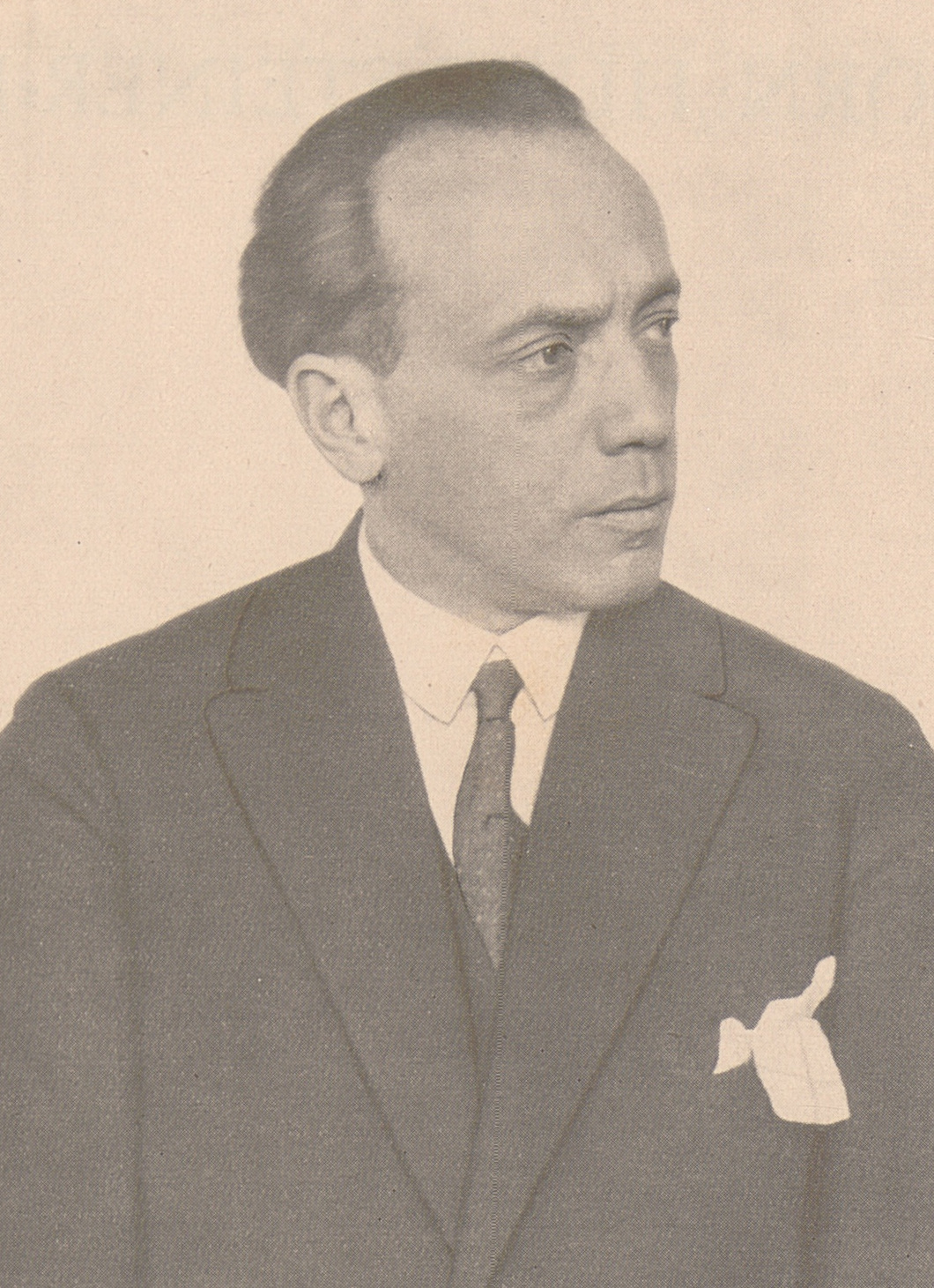
- Hugo c. 1928
- Born: Hugo Steiner; December 12, 1880; Prague, Austria-Hungary
- Died: September 10, 1945 (aged 64); New York City, New York, U.S
- Citizenship: Austria-Hungary; Germany; United States
- Education: Prague Academy; Munich Academy
- Occupations: Illustrator; Educator; Painter
- Years active: 1897–1945
- Known for: Illustrating art in The Golem
- Spouse(s): Paula Bergmann (m. 1905–1941) Eleanor Feisenberger (m. 1941)
- Children: 2

Hugo Steiner-Prag (born Hugo Steiner; December 12, 1880 – September 10, 1945) was a German illustrator, educator and painter, most well known for illustrating the 1915 novel The Golem (1915) by Gustav Meyrink. Born in Prague, he spent years earlier teaching at schools in various cities such as Leipzig.

== Early life and education ==
Hugo was born on December 12, 1880 in Prague, Austria-Hungary as Hugo Steiner, to parents Hermann and Berta Steiner, and was the fourth youngest son in the family. His father was a book-seller. Her mother claimed to be a descendant of Judah Loew ben Bezalel.

Hugo went and studied at the Prague Academy from 1897 to 1901, and then at the Munich Academy from 1901 to 1902. It was there that he added Prag to his name to distinguish himself from other artists, while also referencing his birth place.

== Career ==
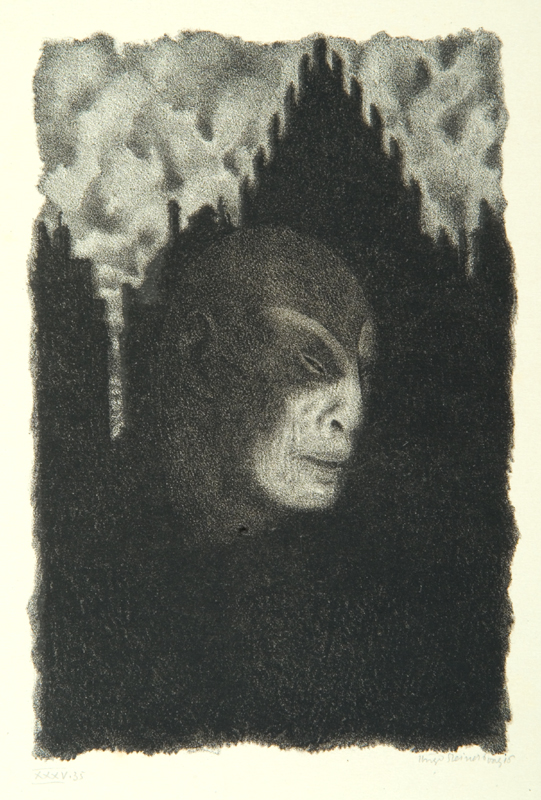
The Golem, depicted on page 2 of the same book, by Gustav Meyrink.

Hugo began his career at age 17. After completing his education, Hugo would go and teach in various schools in Munich after moving in 1900. In his first school, he would start dating a young student named Paula Bergmann, who would become his wife in 1905. During this time, he began travelling to several countries such as Portugal and Belgium.

In 1907, he was appointed as a professor at the State Academy in Lepzig. In 1916, he began illustrating for The Golem (1915) by Gustav Meyrink. In 1927, he became the president of the International Exhibition of Book Art.

== Personal life and death ==
In 1906, Hugo and Paula had two children; Detlev and Helga Steiner. In 1938, Hugo went to Sweden. Hugo escaped the Nazis and moved to the United States after divorcing Paula, where he married a Jewish woman named Eleanor Feisenberger. Hugo died in New York City on September 10, 1945. He was 64.
