= The White Dominican =

1921 novel by Gustav Meyrink

- Author: Gustav Meyrink
- Original title: Der weiße Dominikaner
- Language: German
- Publisher: Rikola Verlag
- Publication date: 1921
- Publication place: Germany
- Pages: 291

The White Dominican (German: Der weiße Dominikaner. Aus dem Tagebuch eines Unsichtbaren, lit. 'The White Dominican: From the Diary of an Invisible') is a 1921 novel by the Austrian writer Gustav Meyrink. It describes a man's spiritual journey toward transfiguration in the town Wasserburg, Bavaria, under the guidance of a series of eccentric and mysterious figures. The novel draws material from various religious and philosophical traditions, notably Tao.
