= The Hot Soldier =

Short story

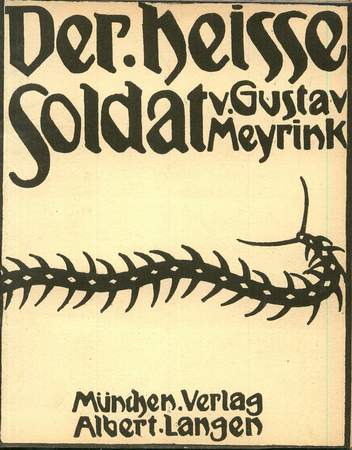
Cover of The Hot Soldier and Other Stories

"The Hot Soldier" ("Der heiße Soldat") is a satiric short story written in 1903 by Austrian author, storyteller and dramatist Gustav Meyrink, as well as the title of the collection in which it appears.

== Editions ==
- Meyrink, Gustav (1906) [1903]. Der heiße Soldat und andere Geschichten [The Hot Soldier and Other Stories] (in German). München: A. Langen.
