= Walpurgisnacht (novel) =

1917 novel by Gustav Meyrink

- Author: Gustav Meyrink
- Cover artist: Emil Preetorius
- Language: German
- Publisher: Kurt Wolff
- Publication date: 1917
- Publication place: Germany
- Pages: 278

Walpurgisnacht (lit. 'Walpurgis Night') is a 1917 novel by the Austrian writer Gustav Meyrink. It is set in the Hradčany district of Prague during World War I and depicts violent unrest through a series of eccentric characters. A central plot development concerns the legend of how the Hussite commander Jan Žižka ordered for his skin to be made into a war drum after his death, and how Žižka seems to possess a sleepwalking actor. The novel has prominent occult themes and elements of social satire and gothic fiction.

When the novel was republished in German in 2017, Johannes Schmidt of Literaturkritik.de recommended it "unreservedly" and wrote that it is remarkable how its disparate elements harmonise and feel necessary rather than oppositional.

The novel was the basis for the 1973 opera Walpurgisnacht composed by Paul Kont to a libretto by Ernst A. Ekker.
