= Jad Hatem =

Lebanese poet and philosopher (born 1952)

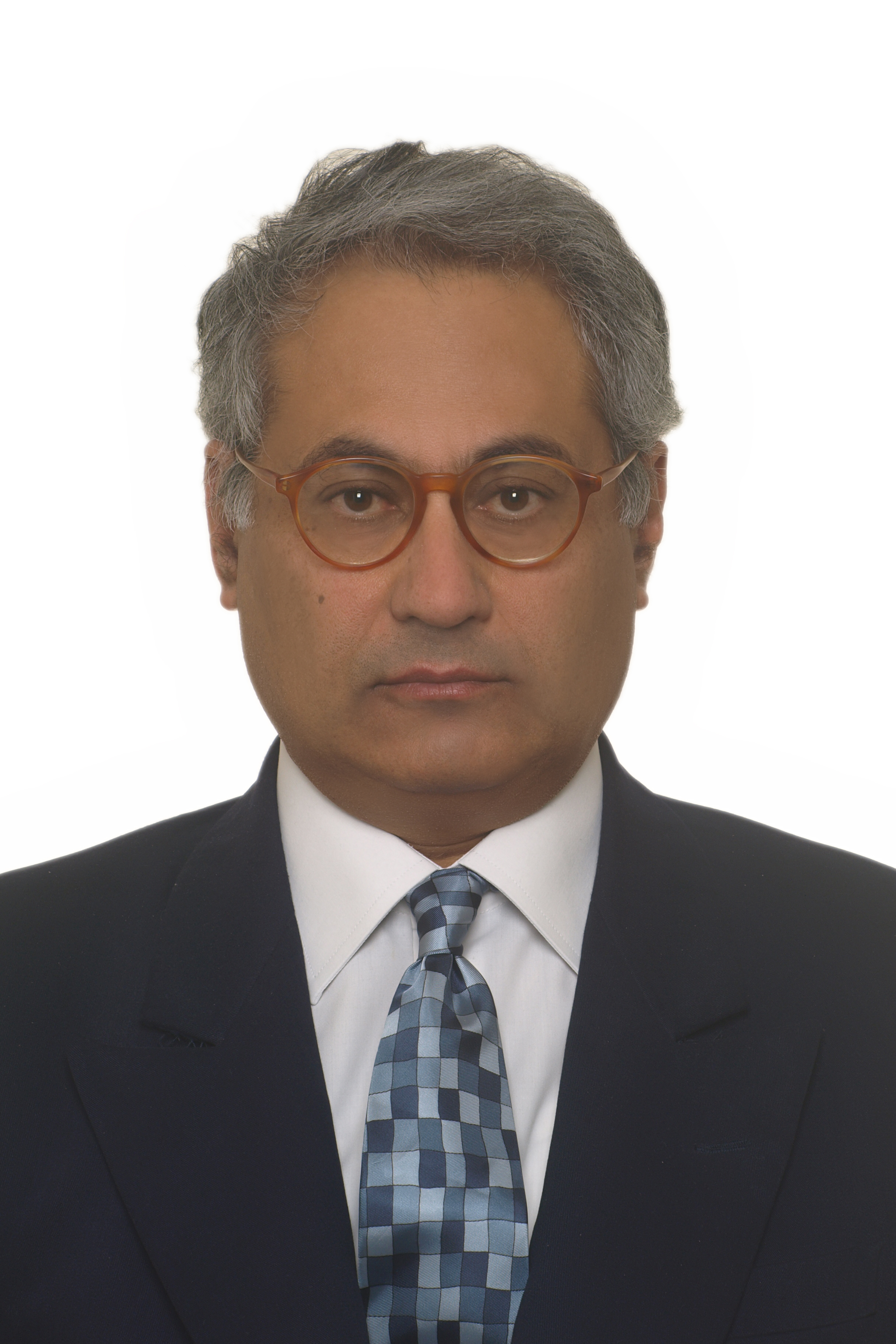
Jad Hetem in 2011

Jad Hatem (Arabic جاد حاتم; born 3 December 1952 in Beirut, Lebanon) is a Lebanese poet and philosopher. He has been a distinguished philosophy, literature and religious sciences Professor at the Saint-Joseph University in Beirut since 1976. Hatem has been the Head of Department of Philosophy (1981–1996 and 2005–2014) and the Director of Michel Henry's Study Center within that department. He's also Editor in Chief of Extasis (1980–1993), La Splendeur du Carmel and L'Orient des dieux, and serves on various other academic editorial boards.

== Bibliography ==
- La Genèse du monde fantastique en littérature, 1980; 2° revised edition, Bucharest, Zetabooks, 2008 .
- L'Absolu dans la philosophie du jeune Schelling, 1981; 2° revised edition, Bucharest, Zetabooks, 2008.
- Nikos Kazantzaki: masque et chaos (tr. gr., Athènes, éd. Kédros, 1984), éd. fr. Paris, Cariscript, 1987.
- Enigme et chant (poésies), Beyrouth, 1985; 2° éd., Paris, Cariscript, 1989.
- Ethique chrétienne et révélation, Paris, Cariscript, 1987.
- L'Echarde du mal dans la chair de Dieu, Cariscript, 1987.
- Mal et transfiguration, Paris, Cariscript, 1987.
- De l'Absolu à Dieu. Autour du Traité sur la liberté de Schelling, Paris, Cariscript, 1987.
- La Quête poétique de Nadia Tuéni, Beyrouth, éd. Dar An-Nahar, 1987.
- Yahya Ibn Adî wa tahdhîb al-akhlâq, Beyrouth, Dar el-Machreq, 1987.
- Au sortir du visage (poésie), Paris, Cariscript, 1988.
- Les Libans de rêve et de guerre, Paris, Cariscript, 1988.
- Hermann Hesse et la quête de soi, Paris, Cariscript, 1988.
- L'Offrande vespérale (poésie), Paris, Cariscript, 1989.
- L'Etre et l'extase. Sur trois poèmes de Hokushi, Forthomme et Mambrino, Paris, Cariscript, 1994.
- La Charité de l'infinitésimal (with Bernard Forthomme), Paris, Cariscript, 1994.
- Les Cèdres talismaniques, Beyrouth, Aliahova, 1996.
- Hospitalité et signification : Jeanne-Antide Thouret et Edith Stein (with Bernard Forthomme), Paris, Cariscript, 1996.
- Affectivité et altérité selon Levinas et Henry (with Bernard Forthomme), Paris, Cariscript, 1996.
- Madame Guyon : Quiétude d'accélération (with Bernard Forthomme), Paris, Cariscript, 1997.
- La Ville des puits à l'envers (nouvelles) (with Bernard Forthomme), Beyrouth, 1998.
- L'Audace pascale (poésie), Paris, Cariscript, 1998.
- La Vérité de l'homme au croisement des cultures. Essai sur Sélim Abou, Paris, Cariscript, 1999.
- Introduction à la lecture de Çankara, Paris, Geuthner, 1999. See Adi Shankarâchârya.
- La Mystique de Gibran et le supra-confessionnalisme religieux des chrétiens d'Orient, Paris, Les Deux Océans, 1999. Voir Khalil Gibran.
- Mal d'amour et joie de la poésie chez Majnoun Layla et Jacques Jasmin, Agen, Quesseveur, 2000.
- Par la poussière des étoiles (poésie), illustrations by Réthy Tambourgi, Paris, Cariscript, 2000.
- Hindiyyé d'Alep. Mystique de la chair et jalousie divine, Paris, L'Harmattan, 2001.
- L'Inversion du maître et du serviteur, Paris, L'Harmattan, 2001.
- Marx, philosophe de l'intersubjectivité, Paris, L'Harmattan, 2002.
- Qu'est-ce qu'un Messie?, in Les Tentations du Christ (avec Jacques Caillot et Guillaume Cassegrain), Paris, DDB, 2002.
- Recherches sur les christologies maronites, Paris, Geuthner, 2002.
- Soleil de nuit. Rilke, Fondane, Stétié, Tuéni, Paris, IDlivre, 2002.
- Extase cruciale et théophorie chez Thérèse d'Avila, Paris, L'Harmattan, 2002.
- Le Premier Œil, (poèmes), illustrations by Anne Guichard, Paris, L'Harmattan, 2003.
- Suhrawardî et Gibran, prophètes de la Terre astrale, Beyrouth, Albouraq, 2003.
- La Gloire de l'Un. Philoxène de Mabboug et Laurent de la Résurrection, Paris, L'Harmattan, 2003.
- La Femme nodale. Thomas Mann et Daniel Cohen, Paris, L'Harmattan, 2003.
- Semer le Messie selon Fondane poète, Bruxelles, La Part de l'œil, 2004.
- Sagesses de Jesus le Christ, Beyrouth, Albouraq, 2004.
- Le Sauveur et les viscères de l'être. Sur le gnosticisme et Michel Henry, Paris, L'Harmattan, 2004.
- Christ et intersubjectivité chez Marcel, Stein, Wojtyla et Henry, Paris, L'Harmattan, 2004.
- Eléments de théologie politique, Paris, L'Harmattan, 2005.
- Mystique et philosophie mêlées, Paris, L'Harmattan, 2005
- Figures de la foudre, méditations poétiques sur trois sculptures de Réthy Tambourgi, Agen, Quesseveur, 2005.
- Hallâj et le Christ, Paris, L'Harmattan, 2005.
- Marx, philosophe du mal, Paris, L'Harmattan, 2006.
- Théologie de l'œuvre d'art mystique et messianique. Thérèse d'Avila, Andreï Roublev, Michel Henry, Bruxelles, Lessius, 2006.
- Satan, monothéiste absolu selon Goethe et Hallâj, Paris, Éditions du Cygne, 2006.
- Dieu en guise d'homme dans le druzisme, Paris, Librairie de l’Orient, 2006
- Le Lever de l’Aurore, Agen, Quesseveur, 2007
- Les Trois Néphites, le Bodhisattva et le Mahdî ou l'ajournement de la béatitude comme acte messianique, Paris, Ed. du Cygne, 2007.
- Charité de l'infinitésimal. Variations leibniziennes, Paris, L'Harmattan, 2007
- Shakespeare et Louise Labé. Essai sur la poésie de l’extase amoureuse, Paris, Orizon, 2008.
- Phénoménologie de la création poétique, Paris, L'Harmattan, 2008.
- La Rosace. Prolégomènes à la mystique comparée, Paris, Ed. du Cygne, 2008.
- L'Art comme autobiographie de la subjectivité absolue. Schelling, Balzac, Henry
