= Gustav Meyrink =

Austrian writer and translator (1868–1932)

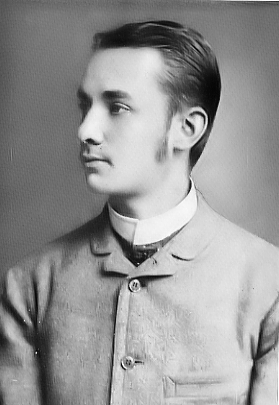
- Meyrink around 1886
- Born: Gustav Meyer; 19 January 1868; Vienna, Austria-Hungary (now Austria)
- Died: 4 December 1932 (aged 64); Starnberg, Bavaria, Weimar Republic
- Known for: The Golem
- Children: 2
- Father: Karl von Varnbüler

Gustav Meyrink (19 January 1868 – 4 December 1932) was the pseudonym of Gustav Meyer, an Austrian author, novelist, dramatist, translator, and banker, most famous for his novel The Golem. He has been described as the "most respected German language writer in the field of supernatural fiction".

== Childhood ==
Gustav Meyrink was born with the name Gustav Meyer in Vienna, Austria-Hungary (now Austria) on 19 January 1868. He was the illegitimate son of Baron Karl von Varnbüler und zu Hemmingen, a Württembergian minister, and actress Maria Wilhelmina Adelheid Meier. Meyrink was not, despite the statements of some of his contemporaries, of Jewish descent – this rumor arose due to a confusion of his mother with a Jewish woman of the same name.

Until thirteen years of age Meyrink lived mainly in Munich, where he completed elementary school. He then stayed in Hamburg for a brief time, until his mother relocated to Prague in 1883.

== Prague ==
Meyrink lived in Prague for twenty years and has depicted it many times in his works. In 1889, together with the nephew of poet Christian Morgenstern, Meyrink established his own banking company, named "Meier & Morgenstern".

In Prague an event occurred which played a providential role in Meyrink's life. Meyrink described it in the autobiographical short story "The Pilot". That day, 14 August 1892, on Assumption Eve, Meyrink, twenty-four years old, was allegedly standing at his table with a gun at his head, determined to shoot himself. At that moment he heard a strange scratching sound and someone's hand put a tiny booklet under his door. The booklet was called Afterlife. Meyrink was surprised by this dramatic coincidence and started to study the literature of the occult. He studied theosophy, Kabbala, Christian Sophiology and Eastern mysticism. Until his death Meyrink practiced yoga and other occult exercises. Results of these studies and practices are found in Meyrink's works, which almost always deal with various occult traditions.

Meyrink worked as a bank manager from 1891 to 1902 when he was charged with fraud amidst rumors that he was directing the bank's affairs in accord with spiritualism. Though after two months he was released from jail, his banking career was effectively ended. His jailhouse experiences are depicted in his most famous novel, The Golem (1913–14).

== Early works ==
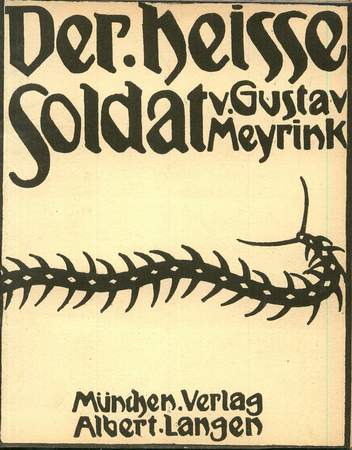
Cover of The Hot Soldier and Other Stories

During the 1900s Meyrink started publishing satiric short stories in the magazine Simplicissimus, signing them with his mother's surname. During spring 1903 Meyrink's first book, The Hot Soldier and Other Stories, was published. Approximately at the same time he relocated to Vienna. Almost immediately after his arrival he published another compilation of his short stories, The Orchid. Strange stories.

On 8 May 1905 Meyrink married Philomene Bernt, whom he had known since 1896. On 16 July 1906 his daughter Sybille Felizitas was born. On 17 January 1908, two days before Meyrink's fortieth birthday, the second son, Harro Fortunat, was born. Subsequently, the main character of the second Meyrink's novel The Green Face was given the same name. In 1908 the third compilation of short stories, Waxworks, was published.

Being in need of money, Meyrink started working as a translator, and he became a prolific one; during five years he managed to translate into German fifteen volumes of Charles Dickens, as well as work by Rudyard Kipling and Lafcadio Hearn. He continued translating until his death, including various occult works and even the Egyptian Book of the Dead. Meyrink also edited a series of books on the occult.

In 1911 Meyrink relocated with his family to the little Bavarian town Starnberg, and in 1913 the book Des deutschen Spießers Wunderhorn (The German Philistine's Magic Horn) was published in Munich. It was a compilation of short stories from the previous three books and several new ones; the title is a parody of Des Knaben Wunderhorn. Many of these stories had satirical styles, ridiculing institutions such as the army and the church; Austrian writer Karl Kraus would later describe Meyrink's work as combining "Buddhism with a dislike for the infantry".

== Fame ==
In 1915 the first and most famous of Meyrink's novels, The Golem, was published, though its drafts may be traced back to 1908. The novel is based on the Jewish legend about a rabbi who made a living being known as a golem (גולם) out of clay and animated it with a Kabbalistic spell, although these legends have little to do with the story's plotline. The main character is Athanasius Pernath, a contemporary lapidary from Prague. It is left to the reader to decide whether Pernath is simply writing down his hallucinations or gradually becoming a real golem. Frenschkowski describes the Golem as both "a deep-footed initiatory tale and an urban fantasy". The novel was a great commercial success. In 1916 one more compilation of short stories, Bats, and soon a second novel, The Green Face, was published. The next year his third novel, Walpurgis Night, was written. The success of these works caused Meyrink to be ranked as one of the three main German-language supernatural fiction authors (along with Hanns Heinz Ewers and Karl Hans Strobl).

Meyrink was opposed to World War I (then called the Great War), which caused him to be denounced by German nationalists; the German "Völkisch" journalist Albert Zimmermann (1873-1933) described Meyrink as "one of the cleverest and most dangerous opponents of the German nationalist ideal. He will influence – and corrupt – thousands upon thousands, just as Heine did". In 1916 Des deutschen Spießers Wunderhorn was banned in Austria.

By 1920 Meyrink's financial affairs improved so that he bought a villa in Starnberg. The villa became known as "The House at the Last Lantern" after the name of the house from The Golem. There he and his family lived for the next eight years and two more works – The White Dominican and Meyrink's longest novel The Angel of the West Window – were written.

In 1927 Meyrink formally converted to Mahayana Buddhism.

== Death ==
During the winter of 1931, while skiing, Meyrink's son seriously injured his backbone and for the rest of his life he was confined to his armchair. On 12 July 1932, at the age of 24, he committed suicide – at the same age that his father considered doing it. Meyrink survived his son by half a year. He died on 4 December 1932 in Starnberg, Bavaria, Germany. In his final days he was suffering from acute shortness of breath as a result of dropsy. His wife reported that he told her that he wanted to die quite consciously (Ich will ganz bewusst sterben). He then removed his shirt, spread his arms and died looking out a window at the rising sun. He is buried in Starnberg Cemetery.

== Reputation ==
Frenschkowski notes "like those of most other German and Austrian fantastic writers, his books were prohibited during the Nazi era". Later, Meyrink's work enjoyed a revival; Meyrink was discussed in a special edition of the French journal L'Herne (1976), and his work has been translated into Spanish, French, Russian, Portuguese, Dutch and English.

== Bibliography ==
- The Hot Soldier and Other Stories (Der heiße Soldat und andere Geschichten), 1903
- Orchideen. Sonderbare Geschichten, 1904
- The Waxworks, 1907
- “Der Stein der Tiefe,” fragment published in the literary and art journal Pan, 1911
- The German Philistine's Horn (Des deutschen Spießers Wunderhorn), 1909
- Der Violette Tod, 1913
- The Golem (Der Golem), serialized in 1913/1914, published in novel form in 1915
- Bats (Fledermäuse), 1916
- The Green Face (Das grüne Gesicht), 1916
- Walpurgis Night (Walpurgisnacht), 1917
- Der Mann auf der Flasche, 1920
- The Land of the Time-Leeches (J.H. Obereits Besuch bei den Zeit-Egeln), 1916
- The White Dominican (Der weiße Dominikaner), 1921
- At the Threshold of the Beyond, 1923
- Goldmachergeschichten, August Scherl Verlag, Berlin 1925
- Die Heimtückischen Champagnons und Andere Geschichten, 1925
- Meister Leonhard, 1925
- The Angel of the West Window (Der Engel vom westlichen Fenster), 1927
- Der Uhrmacher, 1937 (published posthumous)

== See also ==
- List of Austrian writers
