= List of actors who have played Van Helsing =

The following is a list of actors (Note: The gender-neutral term actors is used in this article. Also note that this list includes female actors, such as Dolly Wells.) who have played Van Helsing in various media. Primarily focusing on portrayals of Professor Abraham Van Helsing, it also covers the character's adaptational descendents and successors who share the name and fill the same role.

== Radio and audio dramas ==
Name	Title	Date	Type
Edward Van Sloan	Stardom of Broadway - "Dracula"	1928	Radio episode (American)
George Coulouris	The Mercury Theatre on the Air - "Dracula"	1938	Radio episode (American)
Lister Sinclair	Stage 49 - "Dracula"	1949	Radio episode (Canadian)
Ivan Hanly	Dracula	1960s	RTÉ Radio play (Irish)
Aubrey Woods	Dracula	1975	BBC Radio play
Aubrey Woods	Sherlock Holmes vs. Dracula	1981	BBC Radio play
Finlay Welsh	Dracula	1994	BBC Radio serial
	Dracula	2006	2 part serial (BBC Radio)
David Selby	Dracula	2011	Recorded live reading (LA Theatre Works)
John Banks	Sherlock Holmes - "The Tangled Skein"	2012	Audio drama (Big Finish Productions)
John Dougall	Dracula	2012	2 part serial (BBC Radio)
Tim Curry	Dracula	2014	Audio drama (Audible)
Nigel Betts	Dracula	2016	Audio drama (Big Finish Productions)
Anthony D.P. Mann	Dracula	2017	Audio play (Bleak December Inc.)
Glen McCready	Dracula's Guests	2020	Audio drama (Big Finish Productions)
Glen McCready	Dracula's War	2020	Audio drama (Big Finish Productions)
Colin Baker	Voices of Dracula	2021	Audio drama (AUK Studios)
Basil Waite (Note: as Thomas Van Helsing)	The Holmwood Foundation	2024	Scripted podcast
Alan Burgon	Re: Dracula	2025	Scripted podcast
Flloyd Kennedy (Note: as Abrianna Van Helsing)	Dracula: 2004	2025-present	Scripted podcast
Maggie Gyllenhaal	Bram Stoker's Dracula	2026	Audible original

== Stage plays ==
Name	Title	Date	Type
Hamilton Deane	Dracula	1924	Play by Hamilton Deane
Sam Livesey	Dracula	1927-1928	Play by Hamilton Deane
Norman Partriege	Dracula	1927-1929	Play by Hamilton Deane
Edward Van Sloan	Dracula	1927-1928	Play by Hamilton Deane
Maurice Morris	Dracula	1931	Play by Hamilton Deane
Jerome Dempsey	Dracula	1977-1980	Play by Hamilton Deane
Peter Walker	Dracula	1977-1980	Play by Hamilton Deane
Stephen Scott	Dracula	1977-1980	Play by Hamilton Deane
David Hurst	Dracula	1978-1979	Play by Hamilton Deane
George Martin	Dracula	1978-1979	Play by Hamilton Deane
Michael Burg	Passion of Dracula	1977	Play
Victoria Hardcastle (Note: as Tanya Van Helsing)	Dracula	1984	Adapted by Chris Bond
Victor A. Young	Dracula: A Chamber Musical	1997	Musical
Gordon McLaren	Dracula: A Chamber Musical	1998	Musical
Michael Fletcher	Dracula: A Chamber Musical	1999	Musical
Stephen McKinley Henderson	Dracula, the Musical	2004-2005	Musical by Frank Wildhorn
Chuck Wagner	Dracula, the Musical	2004-2005	Musical by Frank Wildhorn
Thomas Borchert	Dracula, the Musical	2005-2006	Musical by Frank Wildhorn
Drew Sarich	Dracula, the Musical	2005-2006	Musical by Frank Wildhorn
Mike Cosgrove	Dracula, the Musical	2010	Musical by Frank Wildhorn
Soma Suzuki	Dracula, the Musical	2011	Musical by Frank Wildhorn
Yang Jun-mo	Dracula, the Musical	2014	Musical by Frank Wildhorn
Zahra Newman	Dracula	2024	Adapted by Kip Williams
Cynthia Erivo	Dracula	2026	Adapted by Kip Williams

== Television and DTV films ==
Name	Title	Date	Type
Ota Sklenčka	Hrabě Drakula	1971	Czechoslovak film
Nigel Davenport	Bram Stoker's Dracula	1974	Television film (British)
Frank Finlay	Count Dracula	1977	Television film (British)
David Lee Moroni	Dracula: Pages from a Virgin's Diary	2002	Recorded ballet production (Canadian)
Hugh Jackman (Note: as Gabriel Van Helsing)	Van Helsing: The London Assignment	2004	Animated direct-to-video film (American)
Casper Van Dien	Dracula 3000	2004	Made-for-television film (American-South African)
Rhett Giles	Bram Stoker's Way of the Vampire	2005	Direct-to-video film (American)
Rhett Giles	Bram Stoker's Dracula's Curse	2006	Direct-to-video film (American)
David Suchet	Dracula	2006	Television film (British)
Cam Clarke (Note: as Van Hellscream)	Monster High: Fright On!	2011	Animated TV special (American
Keith Reay	Dracula Reborn	2012	Direct-to-video film (American)
Jon Voight (Note: as Leonardo Van Helsing)	Dracula: The Dark Prince	2013	American film
Kathryn Hahn (Note: as Ericka Van Helsing)	Hotel Transylvania: Transformania	2022	Animated streaming film, "Hotel Transylvania" franchise (American)
Jim Gaffigan	Hotel Transylvania: Transformania	2022	Animated streaming film, "Hotel Transylvania" franchise (American)
Christina Prouty (Note: as Amelia Van Helsing)	Dracula: The Original Living Vampire	2022	Direct-to-video film (American)
Mark Topping	Bram Stoker's Van Helsing	2021	Direct-to-video film (British)
Mark Topping	Wrath of Dracula	2023	Direct-to-video film (British)

== Television series ==
Name	Title	Date	Type
Bernard Archard	Mystery and Imagination - "Dracula"	1968	Feature length TV episode (British)
Nehemiah Persoff	Purple Playhouse - "Dracula"	1973	TV episode (Canadian)
Bent Børgesen	Draculas ring	1978	Danish miniseries
Malachi Throne	Broadway on Showtime - "Passion of Dracula"	1980	Televised stage performance
Bernard Behrens (Note: as Gustav Van Helsing)	Dracula: The Series	1990-1991	American-Canadian series
Giancarlo Giannini (Note: as Enrico Valenzi)	Dracula	2002	Miniseries (Italian-German)
Terence Maynard (Note: as Eric Van Helsing)	Young Dracula	2006-2008	TV series (British)
Terry Haywood (Note: as Jonathan Van Helsing)	Young Dracula	2006-2012	TV series (British)
Jo-Anne Knowles (Note: as Mina Van Helsing)	Young Dracula	2007-2012	TV series (British)
Thomas Kretschmann	Dracula	2013	TV series (British-American)
David Warner	Penny Dreadful - "Demimonde" and "What Death Can Join Together"	2014	TV series (American-British)
Kelly Overton (Note: as Vanessa Helsing)	Van Helsing	2016-2021	TV series (American-Canadian)
Michael Eklund	Van Helsing	2018-2019	TV series (American-Canadian)
Dolly Wells (Note: as Agatha Van Helsing)	Dracula	2020	TV serial (British)

== Theatrical films ==
Name	Title	Date	Type
John Gottowt (Note: as Professor Bulwer)	Nosferatu	1922	German film
Paul Askonas	Drakula halála	1923	Austrian production
Edward Van Sloan	Dracula	1931	Universal's Dracula series (American)
Edward Van Sloan	Dracula's Daughter	1936	Universal's Dracula series (American)
Eduardo Arozamena	Dracula	1931	Universal's Dracula series (Spanish)
Kemal Emin Bara (Note: as Dr. Nuri)	Drakula İstanbul'da	1952	Turkish film
Peter Cushing	Dracula	1958	Hammer's Dracula series (British)
Peter Cushing	The Brides of Dracula	1960	Hammer's Dracula series (British)
Peter Cushing	Dracula A.D. 1972	1972	Hammer's Dracula series (British)
Peter Cushing	The Satanic Rites of Dracula	1973	Hammer's Dracula series (British)
Peter Cushing	The Legend of the 7 Golden Vampires	1974	Hammer's Dracula series (British-Hong Kong)
Herbert Lom	Count Dracula	1970	West German-Italian-Spanish-British co-production
Dennis Price	Son of Dracula	1974	British film
Reggie Nalder	Dracula Sucks	1978	American pornographic film
Walter Ladengast	Nosferatu the Vampyre	1979	West German-French film
Richard Benjamin (Note: as Jeffrey Rosenburg)	Love at First Bite	1979	American film
Laurence Olivier	Dracula	1979	Adapted from Hamilton Deane's play (British-American)
Jack Gwillim	The Monster Squad	1987	American film
Anthony Hopkins	Bram Stoker's Dracula	1992	American film
Mel Brooks	Dracula: Dead and Loving It	1995	American-French film
Christopher Plummer	Dracula 2000	2000	American film
Hugh Jackman (Note: as Gabriel Van Helsing)	Van Helsing	2004	American-Czech film
Rutger Hauer	Dracula 3D	2012	Italian-French-Spanish production
Kathryn Hahn (Note: as Ericka Van Helsing)	Hotel Transylvania 3: Summer Vacation	2018	Animated film, "Hotel Transylvania" franchise (American)
Jim Gaffigan	Hotel Transylvania 3: Summer Vacation	2018	Animated film, "Hotel Transylvania" franchise (American)
George Maguire (Note: as Professor Bulwer)	Nosferatu	2023	American film
Willem Dafoe (Note: as Professor Albin Eberhart von Franz)	Nosferatu	2024	American film
Titus Welliver	Abraham's Boys	2025	American film
Christoph Waltz (Note: as the Priest)	Dracula	2025	French-British-Finnish film

== Video games ==
Name	Title	Date	Type
Hugh Jackman (Note: as Gabriel Van Helsing)	Van Helsing	2004	Voice role

== See also ==
- List of actors who have played Dracula
