= Count Dracula in popular culture =

Model of Bela Lugosi as Count Dracula at the Hollywood Wax Museum

The character of Count Dracula from the 1897 novel Dracula by Bram Stoker has remained popular over the years, and many forms of media have adopted the character in various forms. In their book Dracula in Visual Media, authors John Edgar Browning and Caroline Joan S. Picart declared that no other horror character or vampire has been emulated more times than Count Dracula.

Most variations of Dracula across film, comics, television and documentaries predominantly explore the character of Dracula as he was first portrayed in film, with only a few adapting Stoker's original narrative more closely. These including borrowing the look of Count Dracula in both the Universal's series of Dracula and Hammer's series of Dracula, including the character's clothing, mannerisms, physical features, hair style and his motivations such as wanting to be in a home away from Europe.

== Stage ==
=== Drama ===
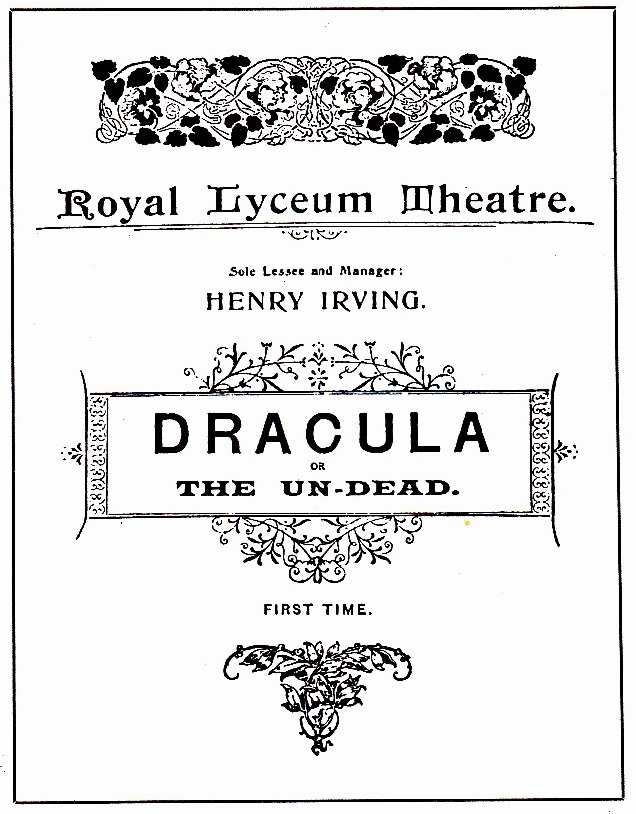
Program for the 1897 Lyceum Theatre stage production of Bram Stoker's Dracula, or The Undead

A limited stage adaptation of Stoker's story was performed to a small audience at the Lyceum Theatre in the year of the book's publication, in order to protect Stoker's copyright. The script for this four-hour performance is lost.

In 1924, the British producer Hamilton Deane premiered a stage version of Dracula at the Grand Theatre in Derby, England. This version of the play was a modernized retelling of Stoker's story. The play's success led to Deane taking it on tour for the next three years. The play opened in London's Little Theatre on 14 February 1927, where it sold well while not being critically well received. After seeing the play in London, American producer Horace Liveright bought the rights for Broadway, and hired John L. Balderston to Americanize Deane's text. The Broadway version featured actors who would later be cast into the Universal film, including Bela Lugosi as Dracula, Edward Van Sloan as Abraham Van Helsing, and Herbert Bunston as John Seward. Dracula opened at New York's Fulton Theatre on 5 October 1927, where it ran for 265 performances finally closing in May 1928. Gary Don Rhodes described the play as "taking America by storm", a statement backed up by a 1930 article in the Chicago Tribune claiming that the play "has been rolling around the country ever since its first vogue two or three seasons ago, coaxing money into box offices that had abandoned hope of the drama, and of the shriek-and-shudder plays of the last five years it easily leads the list."

O. D. Woodward purchased rights to present Dracula on the West Coast, and the play opened at the Biltmore Theater in Los Angeles on 25 June 1928. The play was originally booked for a four-week engagement, but proved so popular that it was held over, closing on 18 August 1928. The play would continue in other countries in 1929 such as Australia. Lugosi would return to act in the play in 1933 after his appearance in the film Dracula (1931) and would return again to the play in 1941 for a two-year tour and again later in 1947. A revival of the play by Leo Shull called Genius, Inc., opened in December 1942 featuring a Dracula with a Toothbrush moustache. John Carradine took to the stage as Dracula in the early 1950s. When the play performed in Detroit, several accidents happened on stage leading audiences to laugh at what were supposed to be scary moments. Frank Langella took on the role of Count Dracula, beginning 7 August 1967, an adaptation that William Gibson, director of the Berkshire declared to be "the worst play of the season".

The Deane-Balderston adaptation of Dracula was described by Bruce Scivally as "seemingly in performance every year since its debut". Variations involving Count Dracula were performed as plays in parody such as Fangs Ain't What They Used to Be in 1969 and I'm Sorry, the Bridge is Out, You'll Have to Spend the Night in 1970. Other plays like Dracula Sabbat from 1970 was basically a scripted black mass featuring nudity and simulated sex acts. For the plays 50th anniversary in America, it was developed again with Langella in the lead. On the play's reveal it was praised for its sets designed by Edward Gorey and Langella's performance which Scivally proclaimed "reclaimed the vampire from a decade of camp and parody and presented Dracula with grace, dignity and a healthy dose of sex appeal." It was sold out for the first two weeks leading to merchandizing of the play with Gorey-themed wallpaper, a toy theatre, and short-lived fashion of men wearing capes in Manhattan. Scivally stated that after the 1970s ended an "explosion" of vampire plays continued into the next decades. Other Dracula plays continued through the 1980s to the 21st century in Chicago and New York with several being variations on the Deane-Balderston adaptation, new stories or parodies featuring actors like Raul Julia, Daniel Day-Lewis and Martin Landau performing as Count Dracula.

=== Musical ===
Early musical adaptions of Dracula played for camp. At the Dublin Theater Festival in 1965, there was a musical comedy Dearest Dracula. The musical contained 15 songs and received a positive review from Robert B. Byrnes of the Los Angeles Times. Other musical adaptations would follow such as Dracula, A Musical Nightmare (1978) starring Joe Spano. Musical adaptations continued with Jack Sharkey's Dracula, The Musical? in 1982, which was written under the pen name of Rick Abbot. Possessed, The Dracula Musical was produced off-Broadway with a production of $1 million. The story is re-imagined inside a modern-day asylum. It received a negative review by Alvin Klein of The New York Times, who suggested that "Perhaps there are no bad ideas for musicals, only bad musicals, like this one." The United Kingdom had Dracula, Another Bloody Musical which opened at the Westminster Theatre in London.

In 1998, Halifax's Neptune Theatre debuted Dracula: A Chamber Musical, which ran for six months at Canada's Stratford Festival in 1999. This version was not a parody or based on the Deane-Balderston play, but more of an iteration of the original novel. In 2001, Dracula, the Musical premiered at the La Jolla Playhouse staged by Des McAnuff. McAnuff stated believed that "there's been a tendency to parody [Dracula] or to not trust it. We all felt that if we really tapped into what made the book powerful, that really would translate on stage." The musical received poor reviews from the Los Angeles Times, The San Diego Union-Tribune. Joop van den Ende saw a workshop of Dracula, the Musical and opened it on Broadway in 2004 adding new songs and different staging. This version was also not received well by critics. The show closed after 154 performances, but proved to be a hit in Europe.

=== Opera ===
Prior to Stoker's novel, there were operas based on vampire fiction such as Heinrich Marschner's Der Vampyr composed in 1828 based on John Polidori's short work "The Vampyre" (1819). The later half of the 20th Century had Count Dracula had composers attempting vampire themed operas with Count Dracula, such as Sue-Ellen Case "non-opera" Johnny Appleseed/Dracula – The Universe in Infancy performed in April 1970 in Los Angeles. John Deak of the New York Philharmonic presented two scenes of his Lucy and the Count for string quintet at Cooper Union in February 1983. A review in The New York Times declared the presentation as "amusing and a little more – intentionally absurd" Composer Robert Moran was commissioned to create The Dracula Diary in 1994 which received a negative review in The New York Times by K. Robert Schwardz who found it to have "Generic chord progressions, clumsy text setting and cheesy synthesized sound effects" In March 1999, David Del Tredici's Dracula premiered based on Alfred Corn's poem My Neighbor, the Distinguished Count.

=== Ballet ===
- The popular and successful balletic Dracula adaptation by Michael Pink and Christopher Gable premiered in 1997, to commemorate the centenary publication of the novel. It was created for the Northern Ballet Theatre in the United Kingdom. The production stays as faithful to the book as possible in non-verbal theatre. Original music was composed by Philip Feeney, the Naxos recording of the score has remained a top seller. Sets and costumes were designed by Lez Brotherston, whose career as a designer for dance began with NBT. Lighting was by Paul Pyant. The production has been seen throughout the world, most companies presenting the work more than once during the last decade. It is the lure of the novel that makes this as popular in the dance world as the film industry. This same production team is responsible for many successful adaptations of popular novels.
- Dracula, a balletic adaptation of Houston Ballet by choreographer Ben Stevenson, set to the music of Franz Liszt, with costumes by Judanna Lynn and set design by Thomas Boyd, premiered in 1997. The ballet saw many US productions since its premiere. The ballet's plot features a set of original characters and happens entirely in Transylvania.
- A new Northern Ballet Theatre production of Dracula was created by choreographer David Nixon in 2005 and has become popular at Halloween among many companies in the US and England. Originally Nixon choreographed his "Dracula" ballet in 1999 for Ballet Met, then redesigned production in 2005 for Northern Ballet. The ballet uses music of Alfred Schnittke and Sergei Rachmaninoff.
- In November 2013, Turkish State Opera and Ballet premiered a new ballet adaptation entitled Kont Dracula at Ankara Opera House.
- In 2018, choreographer Krzysztof Pastor and librettist Pawel Chynowski created the ballet Dracula which premiered in Perth. The ballet draws heavily on music from the 1992 film Bram Stoker's Dracula. The film's composer, Wojciech Kilar, also contributed original pieces to the ballet.

== Live-action films ==
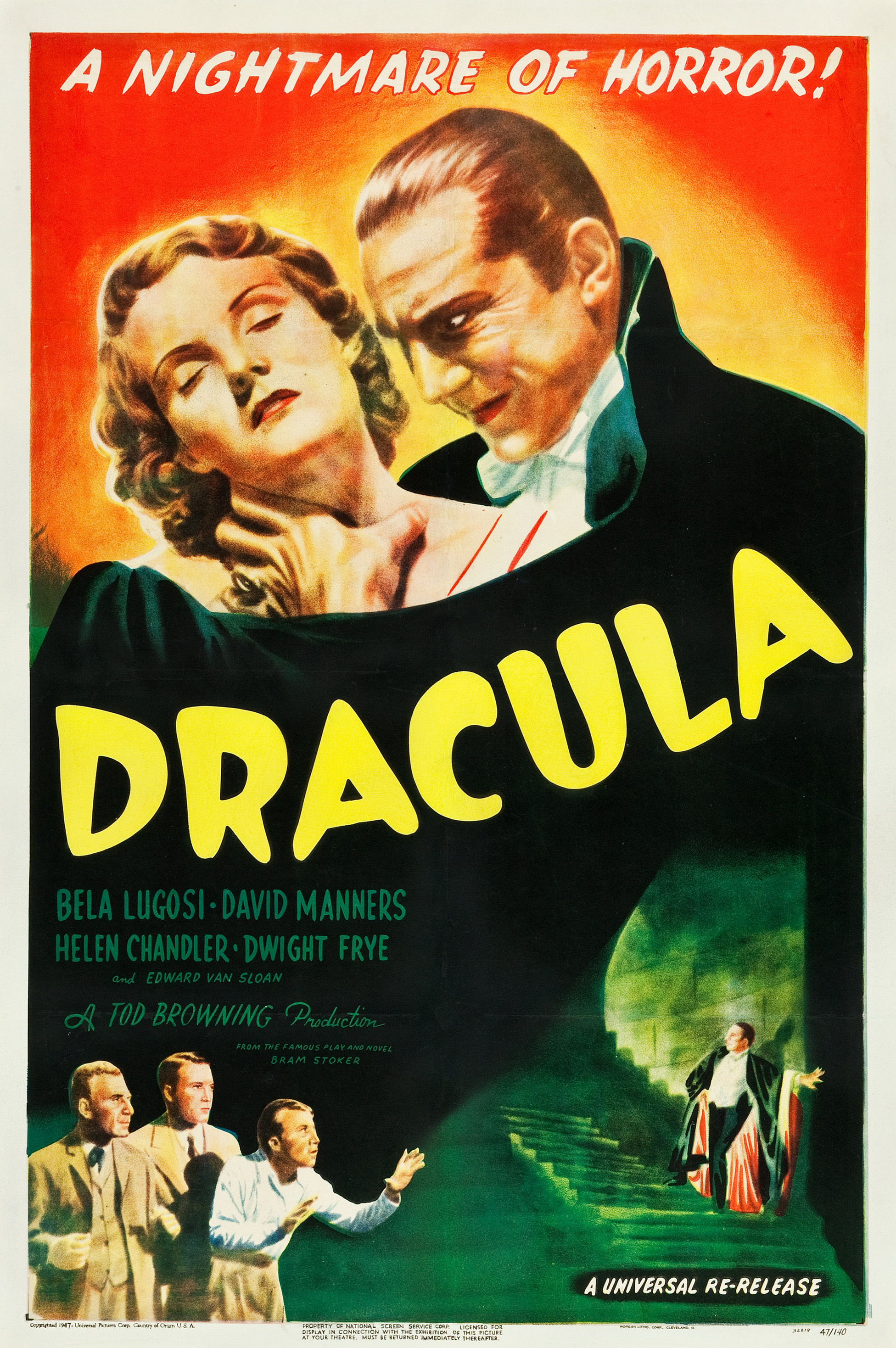
1947 re-issue poster for ''Dracula'' (1931). Several ''Dracula'' adaptations draw from the look and imagery of the 1931 film.

It is rumored that an early Russian film adaptation of Bram Stoker's Dracula was theatrically released in 1920. The existence of this film adaptation is disputed, as there exists very little information or proof of its existence. The earliest provable source for it is the June, 1963 edition of Famous Monsters of Filmland, where it is written "Eric Jason, specialist in stage monsters, once told me he was sure there'd been a Russian version of DRACULA". Ukrainian director Victor Tourjansky has been credited by some writers as the director of the supposed film.

An early adaptation of Dracula is the Hungarian silent movie Dracula's Death; directed by Karoly Lajthay. The film allegedly premiered in 1921, though this has been questioned by some scholars who instead list 1923 as the earliest verifiable release date. The film is currently considered lost in its entirety.

Director F. W. Murnau made an adaptation of Dracula with Nosferatu (1922). Newman declared that this adaptation as "the only screen adaptation of Dracula to be primarily interested in horror, from the character's rat-like features and thin body". The film was, even more so than The Cabinet of Dr. Caligari, "a template for the horror film."

In June 1930, Universal Studios officially purchased the rights to both the play and the novel Dracula. Dracula premiered on 12 February 1931 at the Roxy Theatre in New York again with Lugosi in the title role. Contemporary critical response to Dracula was described by Tom Weaver, Michael Brunas and John Brunas, the authors of the book Universal Horrors, as "uniformly positive, some even laudatory" and as "one of the best received critically of any of the Universal horror pictures." Film historians have differed on what films belong to the series. Ken Hanke wrote in A Critical Guide to Horror Film Series that Universal produced only three films (Dracula, Dracula's Daughter, and Son of Dracula) that "can properly be called part of a loosely grouped Dracula series" though Son of Dracula is really a distant cousin and that the films where Dracula makes "token appearances" were more incorporated into the Frankenstein series. Gary D. Rhodes wrote in his book Tod Browning's Dracula that Universal had produced five films in their classic era whose plotlines assume the audience would be familiar with the Count Dracula character from either viewing or being aware of the 1931 film. Rhodes noted that the later films that include Dracula such as The House of Frankenstein and House of Dracula have the character portrayed differently, as a Southern gentleman with a moustache with only limited appearances in the films, such as his character only appearing for 15 minutes in The House of Frankenstein. In the 1940s and 1950s, Dracula usually appeared as a supporting character in a handful of films.

Hammer originally began developing American-styled science fiction films in the early 1950s but later branched into horror with their colour films The Curse of Frankenstein and Dracula (1958). These films would birth two horror film stars: Christopher Lee and Peter Cushing. Hammer's Dracula series would continue up to the 1970s where it was updated to contemporary settings with Dracula A.D. 1972 (1972) and its sequel The Satanic Rites of Dracula (1973), after which Lee retired from the Dracula role. In the late 1970s, remakes of Dracula were made, including John Badham's Dracula (1979) and Werner Herzog's Nosferatu the Vampyre (1979). Other European productions enhanced the eroticism of the Dracula story such as Paul Morrissey's Blood for Dracula (1974).

In the 1980s, Dracula rarely appeared in film outside nostalgia-themed films like The Monster Squad (1987) and Waxwork (1988). Following the release of Francis Ford Coppola's Bram Stoker's Dracula (1992), a small wave of similar high-budgeted gothic horror romance films were released in the 1990s. Gary Oldman's portrayal of Count Dracula in Bram Stoker's Dracula is shown to be one and the same as Vlad the Impaler, the long-speculated inspiration for the Count, who becomes a vampire after being enraged by his wife's suicide, renouncing God, and drinking blood from a stone cross. The film reintroduces the novel-specific mechanic of Dracula appearing as an elderly man during his first encounter with Jonathan Harker and becoming more rejuvenated the more blood he drinks. Further feature film installments featuring Count Dracula would continue into the 21st century with films like The Last Voyage of the Demeter (2023), Renfield (2023), and El Conde (2023).

=== Pornography ===
The character of Dracula has been an inspiration throughout the history of pornographic film in various high and low budget productions. The character is usually represented by emphasizing the combination his sexual and dangerous aspects. Dracula and Dracula parodies has continued to appear in pornography as production of these films moved from theatres, to home video to the internet.

Dracula often appeared in various sexploitation and hardcore adaptations from the 1960s onward. In these films, Dracula is not always exclusively heterosexual or male. During these periods, pornography films would often parody popular genres leading to Dracula making brief appearances in pseudo-documentary films like Kiss Me Quick! (1964) and later in narrative sexploitation films like Dracula (The Dirty Old Man) (1969) and Sex and the Single Vampire (1970). Dracula appeared in the early hardcore pornography film Dracula and the Boys (1969) as the first homosexual vampire in film.

== Television ==
=== TV adaptations ===
Dracula has been adapted for TV several times, with some adaptations taking many liberties and others trying to stay faithful more or less to original source.

- Thames Television's (UK) anthology series Mystery and Imagination ran a Dracula episode based on the book in 1968. It featured Denholm Elliott as Dracula.
- In 1971, Hrabe Drakula directed by Anna Procházková (the first adaptation to be directed by a woman), was broadcast on Czechoslovakia television. It was reasonably faithful to the novel, except for the exclusion of Renfield. It was the first adaptation to show on screen blood-exchange scene between Dracula and Mina. Ilja Racek played Dracula.
- CBC-TV's (Canada) anthology series Purple Playhouse featured an hour-long adaptation, Dracula based on the book in 1973. It starred Norman Welsh as Dracula.

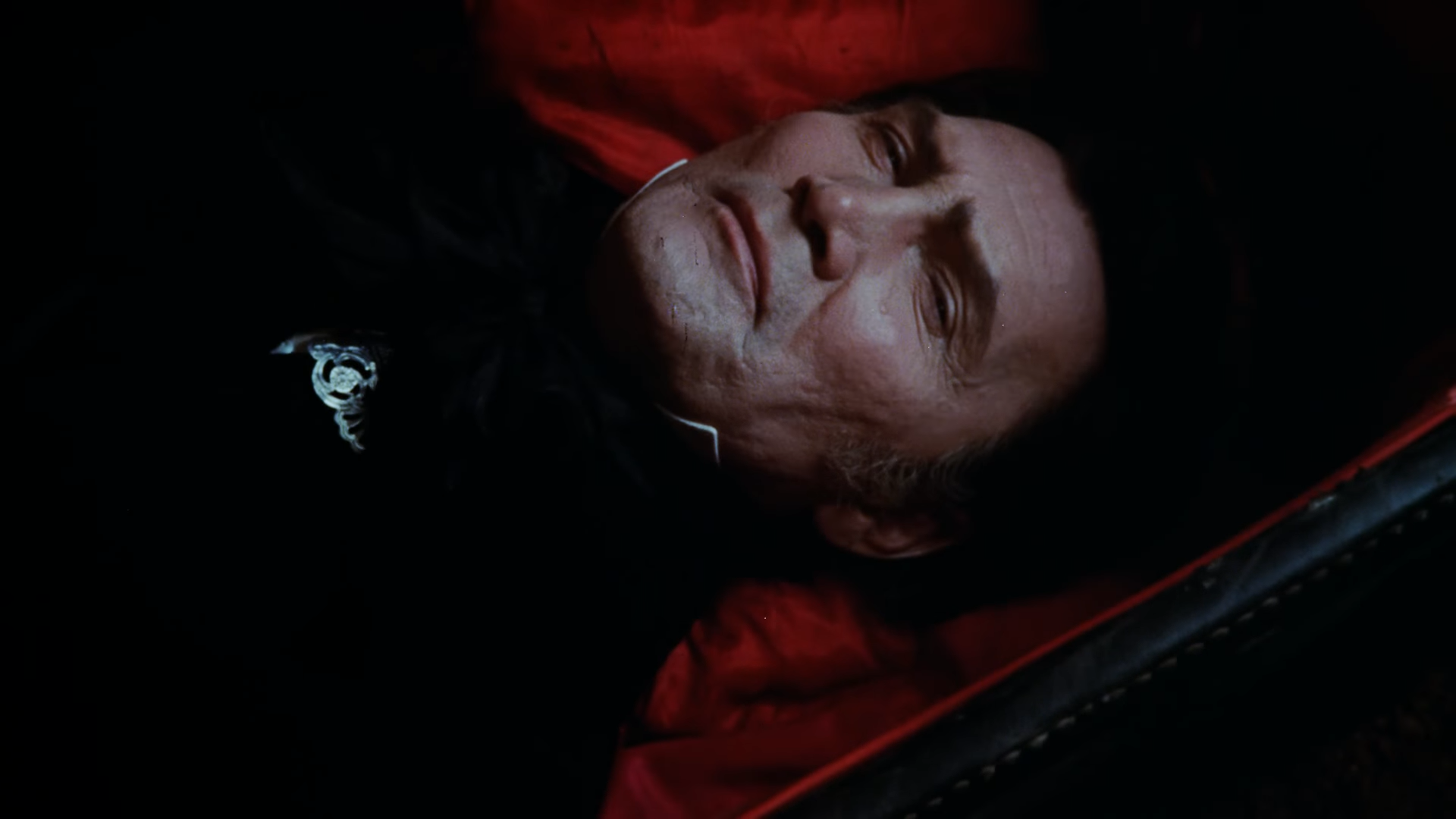
Jack Palance as Count Dracula in Bram Stoker's Dracula

- In 1973, Bram Stoker's Dracula, starring Jack Palance, was produced by Dan Curtis, best known for producing the gothic soap opera Dark Shadows, and who worked from a script by sci-fi favorite Richard Matheson. Filmed in Yugoslavia and England, it was relatively faithful to the novel, though it tried to paint Dracula as a tragic, rather than evil, character in search of his lost love. It also drew the connection between Dracula and the historical figure of Vlad the Impaler. In these respects, it is also a close forerunner of Coppola's later film.
- 1977 saw a BBC television adaptation titled Count Dracula directed by Philip Saville. It starred Louis Jourdan as the Count and Frank Finlay as Van Helsing. This version is one of the more faithful adaptations of the book. It includes all of the main characters (only merging Arthur and Quincey into the same character) and has scenes of Jonathan Harker recording events in his diary and Dr. Seward speaking into his dictaphone.
- In 2002, the Italian telemovie Dracula was broadcast starring Patrick Bergin as Dracula. In the U.S., it was released on VHS and DVD as Dracula's Curse. It updates the events of the novel to the present day.
- In 2005, an Indian Malayalam-language adaptation of the novel aired on Asianet, directed by Wins Dieus.
- Wins Dieus made another Indian television series in 2008, also titled Dracula, this time in Telugu which aired on Gemini TV.
- 2006 saw a revisionist BBC TV adaptation of Dracula. It starred Marc Warren as Count Dracula, who was brought to England by Arthur Holmwood in attempt to cure his syphilis, which made it impossible for Arthur to consummate his marriage to Lucy Westenra.
- Dracula was portrayed as the lead character in NBC's 2013–2014 TV series Dracula. This reimagining depicted Dracula (played by Jonathan Rhys Myers) posing as Alexander Grayson, an American entrepreneur who is willing to bring modern science to the Victorian society. In reality, Dracula seeks revenge on those who had betrayed him centuries earlier. As his plans are set into motion, he falls in love with a woman who may be a reincarnation of his deceased wife.
- A 2020 Dracula miniseries for the BBC in partnership with Netflix, from the creators of Sherlock, Steven Moffat and Mark Gatiss. Dracula is portrayed by Claes Bang. In this version Dracula draws plans against Victorian London, but he gets stuck in his coffin under the sea after destruction of the ship Demeter. Dracula finally reaches England in 2021, where he continues his battles with Van Helsing's descendant. This version of Dracula has a special ability to learn new skills by simply drinking the blood of people and it is revealed later that all his traditional vampire weaknesses are in fact linked to his deep feelings of shame and his death wish, and are entirely self-imposed.

=== TV appearances ===
- The Munsters (1964–1966) featured "Grandpa" Sam Dracula (played by Al Lewis), a vampire, who identifies himself as being the Count Dracula in one episode, although he has found a way to sustain himself without blood and is no longer vulnerable to sunlight. He is portrayed as a friendlier mad scientist-type. He still retains his abilities to turn into a wolf or a bat. Instead of the quasi-Eastern European accent usually associated with Dracula, Grandpa Munster speaks with a Brooklyn accent.
- In the Doctor Who story "The Chase" (1965), the Doctor, his companions and the Daleks came across Dracula and Frankenstein's monster, although later both were shown to be robots.
- Gilligan's Island, "Up At Bat" (1966) – After being bitten by a supposed vampire bat, Gilligan believes he is turning into a vampire. A dream sequence that spoofs Gothic horror films has Bob Denver portraying a Lugosi-like Dracula.
- F Troop, "V is for Vampire" (1967) – Vincent Price does a humorously hammy turn as Transylvanian Count Sforza, who dresses and speaks like Bela Lugosi's Dracula. He travels by hearse, carries a pet crow on his arm and moves into a supposedly haunted mansion on the outskirts of town. Everyone is terrified of him, but in the end he turns out to be a harmless eccentric.
- In the Sid and Marty Krofft series Lidsville (1971–1973), one of the evil HooDoo's Bad Hat Gang was Bela the Vampire Hat, a bat-eared top hat with a fanged cowl.
- In the episode of The Brady Bunch "Two Petes in a Pod" (1974), Peter dresses up like Dracula for a costume party.
- In 1976, Dracula appears in the Saturday morning series, Monster Squad and works with Frankenstein's Monster and the Wolfman as superhero crimefighters.
- Draculas ring (1978) is a Danish TV miniseries, written and directed by Flemming la Cour and Edmondt Jensen, starring Bent Børgesen as Dracula, who journeys to Denmark on a quest to reclaim his stolen ring.
- In 1979, Michael Nouri portrayed the Count in the "Curse of Dracula" segment of the NBC television series Cliffhangers.
- At the end of the holiday TV special The Halloween That Almost Wasn't (1979), Count Dracula (Judd Hirsch) gets into a disco suit similar to Tony Manero from Saturday Night Fever after the witch (Mariette Hartley) transforms into a realistic person resembling Stephanie Mangano from the 1977 disco film of the same name.
- British comedy legend Benny Hill played Dracula in a skit "Wondergran Meets Dracula" on his series, The Benny Hill Show.
- The enormous house in the Nickelodeon game show Finders Keepers (1987–1989) occasionally featured a room titled "Dracula's Den", which was constructed to resemble a room in a castle with windows with boards nailed across them (presumably to keep out the sunlight), cobwebs, bats and a Gothic-style chair and roll-top desk. The room also featured a full-sized coffin, in which a cast or crew member usually hid dressed as a mummy or as Dracula himself.
- Count Dracula made two appearances in the live-action superhero show Superboy (1988–1992), played by Lloyd Botchner. One of these episodes was a backdoor pilot featuring the heroic half-vampire son of Dracula.
- Dracula appeared in the self-titled 1990 syndicated series Dracula: The Series. The series lasted only 21 episodes and featured the adventures of Gustav Van Helsing and family versus vampire/business tycoon Alexander Lucard.
- Dracula appeared in one of the commercials for Energizer in 1993. He emerges from his casket to get the battery off the Energizer Bunny, only to be locked out of his castle when the wind blows the front door closed. When he gets his spare key, the sun comes up and Dracula is vanquished.
- Dracula, renamed "General Mattias Targo" (Bob Peck), appears in The Young Indiana Jones Chronicles "Transylvania, January 1918" (later edited into the second half of the film Masks of Evil, with the events being moved towards the end of the war). He is first mentioned as a Romanian General from Transylvania, who wants to crush the invaders of his country, before being revealed to be a vampire. The episode indicates that General Targo was once Vlad the Impaler, and is shown having impaled many of his victims like Vlad. General Targo is destroyed by Allied spies Indiana Jones and Maria Straussler, who drive a stake through his heart.
- Dracula (voiced by Dan Castellaneta) makes a one-time guest appearance on Animaniacs in 1996.
- Dracula has also appeared as a villain in the Season 5 of the TV series Buffy the Vampire Slayer, in an episode called "Buffy vs. Dracula" (2000) with Dracula portrayed by Rudolf Martin. Dracula admits to Buffy Summers that he is intrigued and charmed by her legacy as she is of him. He also clarifies the origin of her powers, regardless of his attempt to lure her to evil. Buffy, having "seen his movies", waits after first killing him, noting that he "always comes back." He reappears in the canon post-finale comics Tales of the Vampires: Antique, and later the Season Eight story "Wolves at the Gate" (both written by Drew Goddard). Outside the canon, Dracula appears in Spike vs Dracula, which reveals that Dracula has connections to the Gypsy clan that cursed Angel with a soul. As established by his appearance in "Buffy vs. Dracula", he is an acquaintance of Anya Jenkins, and Spike claims he is a sell-out of the vampire world, fond of magic and Hollywood. The vampire popularized by Bram Stoker in the novel Dracula is also used as a basis for the ideas in the show, primarily the methods in which vampires are killed.
- In 2000 Rudolf Martin also held the starring role in TV movie Dark Prince: The True Story of Dracula. Shown on United States Networks on October 31, it tells the origins of Vlad III, also known as Vlad Dracula, "the Impaler", who gave Bram Stoker's Dracula his name.
- The So Weird episode "Vampire" (Season 2, Episode 22, aired 2000) features Fi's skeptical brother, Jack, becoming obsessed with an online study group, only to discover the forum moderators are actually vampires, including a character named Vlad born in 1431.
- In several episodes of the TV show Scrubs (2001–2010), the main character J.D. makes references to a movie he is writing called Dr. Acula, the story of a "vampire doctor".
- Emmanuelle vs. Dracula is a 2004 adult (softcore) TV film about Emmanuelle (played by Natasja Vermeer) having a bachelorette party at her house which is interrupted by vampires and Dracula (played by Marcus DeAnda) himself.
- In 2006, a successful U.K. children's comedy, Young Dracula, started on CBBC, featuring the Count and his two young children, Vladimir and Ingrid, trying to live discreetly in rural Wales.
- A mysterious vampire called Dracula appears in the Brazilian telenovela Os Mutantes: Caminhos do Coração (2008–2009). In fact, he is a mutant vampire created by mixing his DNA with vampire bat DNA. Unlike in the novel, this Dracula is neither invincible nor undead, but he does possess superhuman strength and the ability to fly, and he also transforms some female characters into his vampire brides. His lieutenant is a ghoulish vampire called Bram, in homage to the original author. His nemesis is psychokinetic (and psychotic as well) vampire hunter Christiano Pena, who is bent on destroying Dracula, even if he has to kill innocents to do so.
- In a skit of Attack of the Show (2005–2013), Dracula reviews the 2008 film, Twilight, criticizing how Edward Cullen is not a true vampire.
- In the Season 4 episode "Monster Movie" (2008) of the television series Supernatural, a shape-shifter being hunted by Sam and Dean hides under the guise of Count Dracula and considers Dean to be Jonathan Harker and a girl he met and fell in love with to be Mina.
- The Librarian: Curse of the Judas Chalice is a 2008 TV film in The Librarian trilogy of movies starring Noah Wyle as a librarian who protects a secret collection of artifacts from Vlad Dracula and his vampire hordes.
- An episode of the British TV series Demons (2009) called "Suckers" tells the future story of Mina Harker and Quincy Harker.
- Episode 50 called "Bloodlust" (2011) of The Murdoch Mysteries concerns vampire-like attacks at the time of the first publication of Stoker's book.
- Dracula is the main antagonist of the 3rd season of Penny Dreadful (2014–2016), where he is portrayed by Christian Camargo as a fallen angel and the brother of Lucifer. He poses as a kind and somewhat eccentric zoologist named Dr. Alexander Sweet in order to seduce Vanessa Ives, the series' protagonist, and use her power to take over the world.
- Dracula is the main antagonist of Gregg Turkington's Decker vs Dracula (2015), the third season of Adult Swim action spoof series Decker. Portrayed by Ralph Lucas (credited as James Dean, as part of a metafictional storyline involving Dean faking his own death), Dracula has constructed a doomsday device called the Destructicon, and employs characters from the Universal Monsters roster as his henchmen; he is eventually defeated by the ghosts of the Three Stooges (all played by Mark Proksch).
- Tricia Helfer plays gender-bent Dracula in season 4 of Van Helsing (2016-), where she is portrayed as the Dark One who is the ruler of the vampire species.
- Dracula appears as Vlad the Impaler in season 3 of Chilling Adventures of Sabrina (2018-), where he is portrayed by Michael Antonakos. The series presents him as the first vampire. This version dresses like the historical Vlad and looks exactly like his famous portrait. He is confronted by series protagonist Sabrina Spellman.
- Dracula will appear in pilot episode of ABC drama series The Brides and will be played by Goran Višnjić. The series will be a contemporary reimagining of Dracula, as a family drama about empowered, immortal women and the things they do to maintain wealth, prestige, legacy — and their nontraditional family. Dracula is left for dead at his destroyed castle in the Carpathian mountains while his three vampire brides — Cleo, Renée, and Lily — flee to start a new life together.

== Animation ==
Dracula would show up in animation sporadically following the release of Dracula (1931). This included appearances in Disney's Mickey Mouse cartoons (Mickey's Gala Premier (1933)), Terrytoons' Gandy Goose (Gandy Goose in G-Man Jitters (1939), and Gandy Goose in Ghost Town). Dracula would make appearances in animation around the 1960s such as the Japanese series The Monster Kid, and one-off appearances in episodes of the British series The Beatles, the American series Scooby-Doo, Where Are You! and the American stop-motion film Mad Monster Party? (1967).

Dracula would appear in animated television such as Filmation's The Groovie Goolies which was broadcast in 1971. Dracula in this series was described by historian Hal Erickson as removing anything potentially horrifying about the character, as it resembled The Archie Show. Dracula would make brief appearances in animated series such as The ABC Saturday Superstar Movie. Other appearances in animated media include Japan's Dororon Enma-kun by Toei Animation, and episodes of The Pink Panther Show and Challenge of the Superfriends.

Teenage descendants of Dracula appeared on Drak Pack, which featured monsters as the good guys. the show featured the great-grandson of Dracula who thwarted his enemies by super-powered versions of their ancestors. Variations of younger family relatives of Dracula would re-appear alter in The Comic Strip (1987) from Rankin-Bass/Lorimar-Telepictures featured "The Mini-Monsters" featuring the offspring of Dracula and other monsters at a summer resort Camp Mini-Mon, and Hanna-Barbera's Monster Tails, part of Wake, Rattle, and Roll (1990) and the Japanese Vampire Hunter D (1985). Other humorous variations of Dracula's extended family included short-lived series like Little Dracula and Rick Moranis in Gravedale High.

Dracula made casual appearances in other animated television series in the 1980s, including Japan's Don Dracula and a second series on The Monster Kid and the British animated series Count Duckula. The 1990s featured Dracula appearing in television, such as brief appearances in episodes of Mina and the Count, Animaniacs, The Simpsons and Case Closed. The first decade of the 21st century also had Dracula appearing in animated television series, in episodes of the American series Aqua Teen Hunger Force, Robot Chicken, Grim & Evil, Japan's Hellsing, and France's Titeuf. Feature productions such as The Batman vs. Dracula were also released. The animated film series Hotel Transylvania featuring Adam Sandler as "Drac." gave the actor his biggest global hit. The first three films were large financial successes world-wide.

== Books ==
- Makt Myrkranna (Powers of Darkness, 1901) by Bram Stoker and Valdimar Ásmundsson (10. July 1852 – 17. April 1902), is a rewritten Icelandic version of Stoker's novel, and also contains an original preface written by Stoker himself. First appeared in serial form in the newspaper Fjallkonan (The Lady of the Mountain) between January 1900 and March 1901, before being published in book form later the same year. New characters include detective called Barrington and a whole group of villainous aristocrats: Romanian Prince Koromesz, his sister, the beautiful Countess Ida Varkony; Margravine Caroma Rubiano, a medium; and Madame Saint Amand, an elegant young woman noted for taking a number of distinguished lovers.
- A Swedish version from 1899, serialized in the country's newspapers Dagen and Aftonbladet under the title Mörkrets Makter which, just like the Icelandic title, means Powers of Darkness. The translations contains parts not present in neither Dracula or Makt Myrkranna and was translated by someone who used the pseudonym "A—e."
- Dracula has also inspired many literary tributes or parodies, including Stephen King's Salem's Lot, Kim Newman's Anno Dracula-which features a world where Dracula defeated Van Helsing's forces and took over England-, Fred Saberhagen's The Dracula Tape and its many sequels, Wendy Swanscombe's erotic parody Vamp, Dan Simmons' Children of the Night and Robin Spriggs' The Dracula Poems: A Poetic Encounter with the Lord of Vampires.
- The novel Sherlock Holmes vs. Dracula; or, The Adventure of the Sanguinary Count by Loren D. Estleman features Sherlock Holmes and Dr. Watson becoming involved in the confrontation with Dracula, told as though the two were dealing with Dracula when he was not confronting Van Helsing's crew (although Holmes and Watson were not part of Van Helsing's core group, as the professor feared the extra publicity the detectives might attract to their cause).
- In The Diaries of the Family Dracul, a trilogy by Jeanne Kalogridis, Vlad's relationship with his mortal descendants is explored, as are the specific terms of his vampiric curse and his pact with the Romanian peasants who serve him. The novels are written in epistolary form and the story is intertwined with that of Stoker's novel, as well as events from the life of Vlad the Impaler, expanding on minor characters and details from the Dracula mythos and Romanian history and culture.
- Elizabeth Kostova's 2005 novel The Historian follows several historians whose research has led them too close to Dracula as they hunt the vampire across Europe.
- Meg Cabot's 2010 novel Insatiable has a main character named Meena Harper who has a relationship with Dracula's son, Lucien.
- In the book series Vampire Hunter D, which takes place 10,000 years in the future, D's adversary Count Magnus discovers that D is the son of Dracula, who is referred to as "the Sacred Ancestor" in the series.
- Freda Warrington's Dracula the Undead is an unofficial sequel to Dracula.
- Will Hill's Department 19 is about Jamie Carpenter, a descendant of Henry Carpenter, Van Helsing's valet who saves Van Helsing's life multiple times. Department 19 (or Blacklight), is an organization started by the people from the original Dracula, and they fight vampires across the world.
- Dacre Stoker, a great-grandnephew of Bram Stoker, co-wrote with screenwriter Ian Holt a 2009 sequel to Dracula titled Dracula the Un-dead (Stoker's original title), which reveals that Dracula was not actually the true villain, but sought to eliminate the more dangerous Elizabeth Bathory, the storyline also revealing that Quincey Harker is actually the son of Mina and Dracula and ending with the death of all the characters while the sole survivor, Quincey, is last seen boarding the R.M.S. Titanic on her maiden voyage. Dacre Stoker claims that parts of the work are based on excised material from the original novel and Stoker's notes. In North America, the book was published by E.P. Dutton.
- Dacre Stoker also co-wrote a 2018 prequel with J. D. Barker titled Dracul, with Bram Stoker himself as the book's central character.
- A Betrayal in Blood by Mark A. Latham takes an unconventional interpretation of the original novel when Sherlock Holmes is hired by his brother Mycroft to investigate Dracula's death. In the course of the novel, Holmes confirms that Dracula was not a vampire, but in reality his death was part of a complex plan orchestrated by Van Helsing; a former German agent, Van Helsing was acquainted with Dracula in their youth, but after Dracula had an affair with Van Helsing's wife that resulted in the birth of a son, the son was given up for adoption to become Arthur Holmwood and Dracula was told that he was dead. In the course of the novel, Holmes determines that Van Helsing set up various complex deceptions to create the illusion of Dracula as a vampire, killed Quincey Morris because he realized the truth, hired an actress to pose as the vampire Lucy to reinforce his deception and blackmailed Jonathan and Mina to assist him due to their role in the death of Jonathan's employer Mr. Hawkins, while Renfield was the solicitor who was actually sent to Dracula's castle and driven insane by Dracula's manner. At the conclusion of the novel, the Harkers have been arrested, Holmwood is psychologically broken and Van Helsing commits suicide to escape a trial after he is caught by Holmes and Watson.
- Vlad: The Last Confession by Chris Humphreys mixes myth and historical facts. The novel retraces the life of the historical figure of Vlad III who inspired the Dracula legend. While the story is based on the historical 15th century ruler of Wallachia, it also draws inspiration from the vampire legends that surround the Wallachian Prince.
- Gabrielle Estres' novel Captive retraces the life of Vlad Țepeș, the Wallachian ruler who inspired Bram Stoker's Dracula. The book combines historical facts and contemporary 15th century pamphlets with the vampire lore created by Stoker.
- A version of Dracula (who hates the name and is known as Vlad Tepesh) appears first as a supporting character in the Night Huntress series by Jeaniene Frost, then in a more central role as the protagonist's love interest in the spin-off Night Prince series. He is depicted as a powerful master vampire who was turned by a vampire named Tenoch and has the ability to control fire and read human minds in addition to the abilities common to vampires.
- A prequel to Bram Stoker's Dracula, Robert Statzer's To Love a Vampire (ISBN 978-1721227310), chronicles Dr. Abraham Van Helsing's days as a medical student, depicting his first confrontation with the occult during an encounter with Countess Elizabeth Bathory and her niece, Carmilla Karnstein. Originally published as a serial in the pages of Scary Monsters Magazine from March 2011 to June 2013, a revised version of To Love a Vampire was reprinted in paperback and Kindle editions in June 2018.
- Kim Newman's Anno Dracula series: in the first novel Anno Dracula (1992), Count Dracula killed Abraham Van Helsing in 1888, married Queen Victoria and has taken over the British Empire. In The Bloody Red Baron (1995), by 1918 Count Dracula is Supreme Commander of the Central Powers armies during World War I.
- Patrick Sheane Duncan's Dracula vs. Hitler (2016): A sequel to Stoker's Dracula in which Van Helsing awakens Dracula in 1941 to fight the Nazis in Romania.

== Short stories ==
- Shepard, Leslie. 1977. The Dracula Book of Great Vampire Stories. Secaucus, N.J.: Citadel Press. ISBN 0806505656. Edited with an introduction by Leslie Shepard: Le Fanu, S. Carmilla.--De Maupassant, G. The Horla.--Count Stenbock. The Sad Story of a Vampire.--Braddon, M. E. Good Lady Ducayne.--Loring, F. G. The Tomb of Sarah.--Crawford, F. M. For the Blood is the Life.--Benson, E. F. The Room in the Tower.--Blackwood, A. The Transfer.--Stoker, B. Dracula's Guest.--Neruda, J. The Vampire.--Benson, E. F. Mrs. Amworth.--Roman, V. Four Wooden Stakes.--Hartmann, F. An Authenticated Vampire Story.
- Michael Sims. 2010. Dracula's Guest: A Connoisseur's Collection of Victorian Vampire Stories. Walker & Co. ISBN 0802719716. 480 pages. Michael Sims brings together the very best vampire stories of the Victorian era—from England, America, France, Germany, Transylvania, and even Japan—into a unique collection that highlights their cultural variety. Beginning with the supposedly true accounts that captivated Byron and Shelley, the stories range from Edgar Allan Poe's "The Oval Portrait" and Sheridan Le Fanu's "Carmilla" to Guy de Maupassant's "The Horla" and Mary Elizabeth Braddon's "Good Lady Ducayne". Sims also includes a 19th-century travel tour of Transylvanian superstitions and rounds out the collection with Stoker's own "Dracula's Guest"— a chapter omitted from his landmark novel.
- Lanzara, Joseph. 2012. Classic Monster Novels Condensed contains a novella of 28,000 words, which is closely based on the 162,000-word Bram Stoker novel and told in traditional third person narrative. New Arts Library. ISBN 978-1-4791-9322-6.

== Comics ==
Horror comics suffered in competition from the superhero fiction genre, with Dracula and other vampires sometimes finding their mythos absorbed into the genre, such as Dracula's cape seen in films being part of the inspiration for the look of Batman. Dracula was first adapted into a comic in the Avon in August 1953 as Eerie #12. The comic generally faithful to Stoker's book with a changed ending. The comic book industries self-regulation of American comics forbid vampires from appearing in major comic publications such as Marvel Comics, DC Comics and other major publications from 1954 to 1971. In 1962 and 1963, Dell Publishing released comics based on the Universal horror properties including Dracula. These comics featured new stories, not based on the films. Dell re-thought Dracula in 1966, where a follow-up comic turned a descendant of Dracula, who turned into a character that resembled Batman.

The Tomb of Dracula was released by Marvel in the early 1970s that led to Count Dracula later battling superheroes such as Doctor Strange and Captain Britain, as well as the Werewolf by Night and The Frankenstein Monster. Dracula Lives! (1973) and Giant-Size Dracula (1974) followed with Marvel ending its Dracula comics in 1980. The 1980s included Dracula titles including Blood of Dracula which ran for 19 issues. Other titles ranged from Eternity Comics's adaptation of Stoker's novel to Pioneer Comics' Vegas Knights which had Dracula fighting ninjas. In 1991, Marvel recreated The Tomb of Dracula for a four-issue limited series. By the end of the year, DC published Batman & Dracula: Red Rain which sold well. Further crossovers later included Count Dracula battling Godzilla and Jay Gatsby in Godzilla's Monsterpiece Theatre by IDW Publishing.

Topps Comics published an adaptation on the Bram Stoker's Dracula film. In 1992 to 1994, Dracula would battle several characters ranging from Zorro, to several superheroes including Spider-Man, the Silver Surfer and the X-Men. Several indie publishers such as IDW Publishing and Dark Horse Comics making darker and horror themed comics such as 30 Days of Night led to an illustrated issue of the novel Dracula in 2009 as well as Konami's Castlevania franchise.

== Toys and games ==
In his article on horror-themed toys and collectibles in Rue Morgue magazine, James Burrell found that in the late 1950s as a new generation of children watched Universal Pictures catalogue of horror films on Shock Theatre, which gave the series a "kid-friendly" status. Most toy manufacturers conformed to the Toy Advertising Guidelines created by the Code Authority of the National Association of Broadcasters. In 1963, the American retailer Montgomery Ward mailed out copies of their Christmas catalog which features models of various popular monsters including Dracula made by the Aurora Plastics Corporation. These were followed by various bubblegum cards, stickers, board games, battery-operated and wind-up toys, rubber marks made by companies like Leaf Brands, Remco, and Don Post Studios. By 1964, Phil Shabecoff of The New York Times reported this as a "Monster-mania" for toy companies while a spokesperson from Remco stated "Our monster toys aren't nearly the hot item that our The Beatles dolls are." These toys continued to be produced into the 1970s resembling the Universal Horror look of Dracula with less and less produced with the release of Star Wars leading to more toys developed by for that line. Toys of the Universal monsters were re-introduced in the mid-1980s by Imperial Toy Corporation who put out a set of four Universal monster figures.

In 1998, Sideshow Collectibles was the first toy companies to sculpt Toys and action figures of Count Dracula that were accurate to actors like Bela Lugosi. Toys featuring the character of Dracula continued to be produced into the 21st century with by various companies including McFarlane Toys, NECA, and Funko.

=== Video games ===
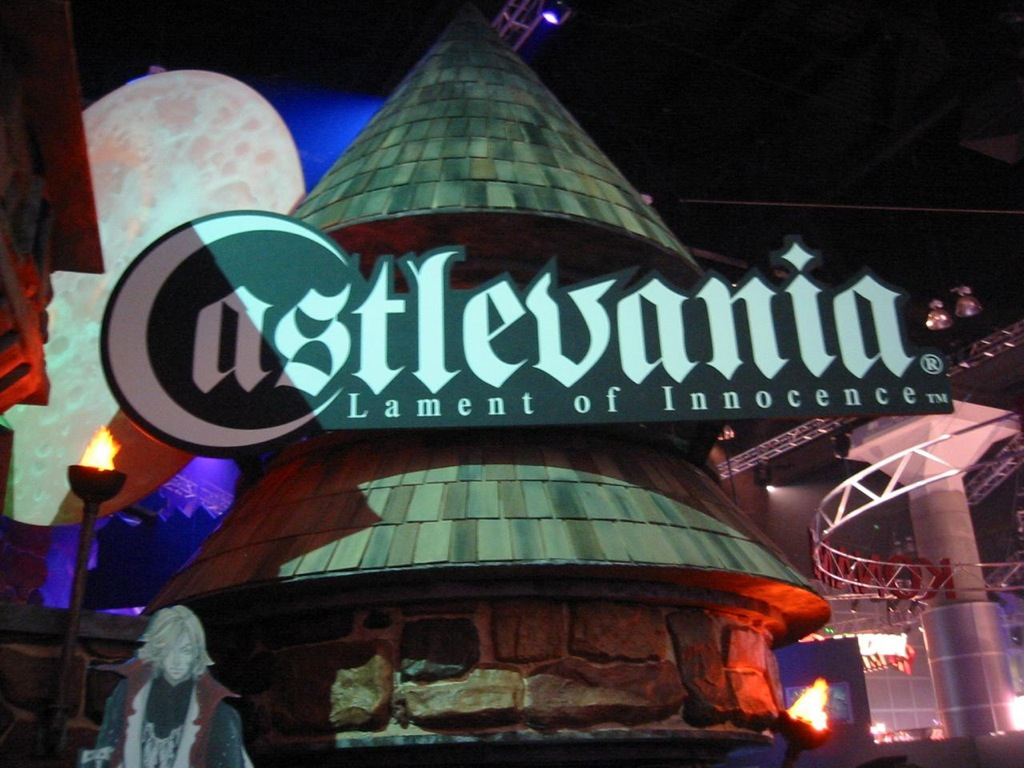
Promotional image of Castlevania: Lament of Innocence (2003) at E3 in 2003. The video game series Castlevania is one of the long running video game series featuring Dracula as a final boss character.

Count Dracula has appeared in various video games, ranging from being a lead character to brief cameo appearances. Among the first Dracula-themed computer games was The Count (1979) by Scott Adams. In 1986, Dracula was released which contained static graphics considered gory enough to become the first computer game to be rated "15" by the British Board of Film Censors. The first game of Konami's Castlevania series, released in 1986 on the Nintendo Entertainment System, features Simon Belmont who traverses Castle Dracula to have a final confrontation with the final boss character of Dracula. The series continued for decades, with Dracula being resurrected and subsequently banished continuously throughout. Carl Wilson described him as a pervasive character across the series, driving the narrative of the games by being "part of the environmental mood" rather than by physically stalking and intimidating the protagonists.

Other series and one-off games featuring Dracula were also released from the 1990s onward, such as Dracula Unleashed (1993), Dracula Detective (1996–1998), Dracula: Resurrection (1999-2014), and several adaptations of Francis Ford Coppola's Bram Stoker's Dracula (1993 and 1994). Dracula is largely unseen within these games outside a climax or in key art. This also happened to take advantage of the copyright-free status of the character in numerous low-budget games and series such as Dracula: Love Kills (2011) or Incredible Dracula (1995-2020).

== Radio and audio ==
- In 1938, Orson Welles and John Houseman chose Dracula to be the inaugural episode of the new radio show featuring their Broadway production company, The Mercury Theatre on the Air. The adaptation was largely faithful to the book, although condensed to fit in the show's hour-long format and with a different ending. Welles was the voice of both Dracula and "Arthur Seward", a pastiche character combining two of Lucy's suitors. The music was composed by Bernard Herrmann.
- Lorne Greene starred as Dracula in a 1949 CBC broadcast directed by Andrew Allen.
- On 2 May 1974 The CBS Radio Mystery Theater, hosted by E. G. Marshall, broadcast an adaptation of Dracula by George Lowthar with Mercedes McCambridge, Paul Hecht and Marian Seldes.
- Loren D. Estleman's novel Sherlock Holmes vs. Dracula: The Adventure of the Sanguinary Count was adapted for BBC Radio 4 and directed by Glyn Dearman in 1981 and starred David March as Dracula with John Moffatt as Sherlock Holmes, Timothy West as Dr. Watson and Aubrey Woods as van Helsing.
- In 1994, Frederick Jaeger starred as Dracula in BBC Radio 4's seven half-hour-episode adaptation of Stoker's novel by Nick McCarty.
- In November 2006, the BBC World Service broadcast a two-part adaptation by John Foley based on the play by Liz Lochhead. It starred David Suchet as Dracula and Tom Hiddleston as Jonathan Harker.
- On 23 February 2008 BBC Radio 4's Saturday Drama broadcast Voyage of the Demeter, a one-hour radio play by Robert Forrest that dramatized the events that took place on board the schooner that transported Dracula to Whitby. Count Dracula, identified in this play as "The Gentleman", was played by Alexander Morton.
- In May 2011, L.A. Theatre Works produced, recorded and aired a dramatization of the novel starring David Selby as Van Helsing, John Glover as Renfield, Karl Miller as Jonathan Harker, Moira Quirk as Lucy Westenra, Lisa O'Hare as Mina Murray and Simon Templeman as Count Dracula. The production is currently available for purchase and download on Audible.com.
- In January 2012, Big Finish Productions released the audio Sherlock Holmes: The Tangled Skein, which serves as both a sequel to the classic Sherlock Holmes tale The Hound of the Baskervilles and a retelling of Dracula, as Holmes and Watson's investigation into the return of Hound villain Stapleton leads to the discovery of Dracula's presence in England, with Van Helsing- now acting alone- asking for their help in confronting Dracula. The audio culminates in a confrontation at Baskerville Hall after Holmes and Watson have killed the now-vampire Stapelton, the two driving Dracula into the Grimpen Mire where he is destroyed by the rising sun after he is trapped in the Mire before sunrise. This adaptation includes Nicholas Briggs as Sherlock Holmes, Richard Earl as Dr Watson, Barnaby Edwards as Stapleton, John Banks as Van Helsing, and Giles Watling as Count Dracula, with all actors aside from Briggs and Earl playing other roles in this adaptation.
- A new two-part adaptation of Stoker's novel by Rebecca Lenkiewicz was broadcast as part of BBC Radio 4's "Gothic Imagination" series on 20 and 27 October 2012, starring Nicky Henson as Count Dracula. Also as part of the "Gothic Imagination" series on 28 October 2012, the F.W. Murnau film Nosferatu was reimagined on BBC Radio 3 as the radio play Midnight Cry of the Deathbird by Amanda Dalton directed by Susan Roberts, with Malcolm Raeburn playing the role of "Graf Orlock (Count Dracula)".
- In 2016, Canadian company Bleak December released a heavily abridged full-cast production starring Tony Todd as the count. It received a limited exclusive vinyl release from Cadabra Records.
- On 28 October 2017, BBC Radio 4 broadcast, as part of its "Unmade Movies" series, Hammer Horror's The Unquenchable Thirst of Dracula, adapted from an unproduced Hammer Horror film script and set in 1930s India. Directed by Mark Gatiss, the cast included Lewis MacLeod as Count Dracula, Michael Sheen as the Narrator, Anna Madeley as Penny Woods, Nikesh Patel as Prem and Ayesha Dharker as Laksmi,

== Music and audio recordings ==
Count Dracula began appearing on musical records as early as 1958 when horror host John Zacherle recorded the novelty single "Dinner with Drac" which charted on the Billboard Pop Singles chart the same year. When Dick Clark played it on his American Bandstand television show, he requested Zacherle record a less-violent version. Other novelty songs followed such as Bruno Martino's "Dracula Cha Cha Cha" (1959), Bobby "Boris" Pickett and the Crypt-Kickers with their song "Monster Mash" (which made reference to Dracula among various monsters while imitating the voice of Boris Karloff. In the early 1960s, horror-themed spoken word albums were released, such as Famous Monsters Speak (1963) featuring actor Gabriel Dell imitating Bela Lugosi as Count Dracula. Similar albums followed recorded by Christopher Lee reading a variation of Stoker's novel. Similar recordings were released into the 1970s. Power Records released audio recordings accompanied by comic adaptations of Dracula such as their Tomb of Dracula series in 1974.

Some rock musicians made reference to horror characters in the 1970s, such as Blue Öyster Cult having several references to vampirism in songs like "Tattoo Vampire", "Harvest Moon", "After Dark", "I Love the Night" and more specifically to Dracula with "Nosferatu". The British group Bauhaus would write the 1979 song "Bela Lugosi's Dead", a track that described an exaggerated funeral of Lugosi, with Alexis Petridis of The Guardian stating the track "would have been just another piece of post-punk experimentation had it not been for the lyrics, which depicted the funeral of the Dracula star, with bats swooping and virgin brides marching past his coffin." Petridis declared the song spawned several similar bands to Bauhaus in its wake leading to gothic rock becoming a codified musical genre. Songs outside rock music making references to Dracula were in hip hop music ranging from small references in The Sugarhill Gang's "Rapper's Delight" (1979) to more broad takes including Outkast's song "Dracula's Wedding" from Speakerboxxx/The Love Below (2003).

Films adaptations of Count Dracula would influence the extreme metal music scene. J. Bennett of Decibel described Emperor's In the Nightside Eclipse (1994) as establishing the band as "the reigning masters of a more complex, atmospheric style of "symphonic black metal"". Emperor guitarist Samoth specifically described that among their visual and musical influences of The Lord of the Rings, the band had a period where they were obsessed with Dracula noting Nosferatu (1922) and Nosferatu the Vampyre (1979) as being a "part of our ambiance and visual influences."

== Others ==
The General Mills cereal mascot Count Chocula is a vampire who craves Count Chocula cereal rather than blood. His title of Count is an allusion to that of Count Dracula's.

The association of the book with the Yorkshire fishing village of Whitby has led to the staging of the bi-annual Whitby Gothic Weekend, an event that sees the town visited by Goths from all over Britain and occasionally from other parts of the world. In addition, the Royal National Lifeboat Institution runs a fundraising bungee jump event in the town every April named the Dracula Drop.

Mad magazine has published countless spoofs of Dracula. In one, appearing in the Mad Summer Special 1983, on the inside front cover, a cartoon sequence drawn by Sergio Aragonés shows Dracula attacking a hippie who has taken LSD; Drac staggers away, seeing colorful hallucinations including blood, bats and such.

In the film Forgetting Sarah Marshall, composer Peter Bretter (Jason Segel), in a subplot, finishes his Dracula-themed rock opera titled A Taste for Love.

Russian authors Andrey Shary and Vladimir Vedrashko in 2009 published a book Sign D: Dracula in Books and on the Screen devoted in particular to Dracula image implications in Soviet and Russian popular and mass culture.

In the United Kingdom, discount store Poundland changes the voice of its self-service checkouts to that of Dracula throughout the Halloween retail period.

=== Tourism ===
There are several locations associated with Dracula and Bram Stoker related tourism in Ireland, Britain, and Romania. These include Whitby in North Yorkshire and Transylvania in central Romania, where especially Bran Castle is marketed to tourists as "Dracula's Castle".

== See also ==
- List of actors who have played Dracula
- Vampire film
