= List of actors who have played Dracula =

The following is a list of actors (Note: The gender-neutral term actors is used in this article. Also note that this list includes female actors, namely Tricia Helfer.) who have played Dracula in various media.

== Radio and audio dramas ==
Name	Title	Date	Type
Bela Lugosi	Stardom of Broadway - "Dracula"	1928	Radio episode (American)
Orson Welles	The Mercury Theatre on the Air - "Dracula"	1938	Radio episode (American)
Lorne Greene	Stage 49 - "Dracula"	1949	Radio episode (Canadian)
Thomas Studley	Dracula	1960s	RTÉ Radio play (Irish)
David March	Dracula	1975	BBC Radio play
David March	Vampirella	1976	BBC Radio play
David March	Sherlock Holmes vs. Dracula	1981	BBC Radio play
Aiden Grennell	Vampirella	1992	RTÉ Radio play (Irish)
Frederick Jaeger	Dracula	1994	7 part serial (BBC Radio)
David Suchet	Dracula	2006	2 part serial (BBC Radio)
Alexander Morton	Voyage of the Demeter	2008	BBC Radio play
Simon Templeman	Dracula	2011	Recorded live reading (LA Theatre Works)
Simon Templeman	Voices of Dracula	2021	Audio drama (AUK Studios)
Giles Watling	Sherlock Holmes - "The Tangled Skein"	2012	Audio drama (Big Finish Productions)
Nicky Henson	Dracula	2012	2 part serial (BBC Radio)
Mark Gatiss	Dracula	2016	Audio drama (Big Finish Productions)
Mark Gatiss	Dracula's Guests	2020	Audio drama (Big Finish Productions)
Mark Gatiss	Dracula's War	2020	Audio drama (Big Finish Productions)
Tony Todd	Dracula	2017	Audio play (Bleak December Inc.)
Lewis MacLeod	Hammer Horror's The Unquenchable Thirst of Dracula	2017	BBC Radio play
Attila Puskas	The Holmwood Foundation	2024	Scripted podcast
Karim Kronfli	Re: Dracula	2025	Scripted podcast
Brad Oliver	Dracula: 2004	2025-present	Scripted podcast
Jonathan Bailey	Bram Stoker's Dracula	2026	Audible original

== Stage plays ==
Name	Title	Date	Type
Edmund Blake	Dracula	1924	Play by Hamilton Deane
Raymond Huntley	Dracula	1927, 1928-1930	Play by Hamilton Deane
Bela Lugosi	Dracula	1927-1929, 1932, 1943, 1947, 1948, 1950, 1951	Play by Hamilton Deane
Courtney White	Dracula	1931	Play by Hamilton Deane
Lloyd Battista	Dracula	1973	Play by Hamilton Deane
Frank Langella	Dracula	1977-1978	Play by Hamilton Deane
Raul Julia	Dracula	1978-1980	Play by Hamilton Deane
Jean LeClerc	Dracula	1978	Play by Hamilton Deane
Jeremy Brett	Dracula	1978	Play by Hamilton Deane
Terence Stamp	Dracula	1978	Play by Hamilton Deane
Martin Landau	Dracula	1984	Play by Hamilton Deane
Christopher Bernau	Passion of Dracula	1977	Play
Joe Spano	Dracula, A Musical Nightmare	1978	Musical
Daniel Day-Lewis	Dracula	1984	Adapted by Chris Bond
Christopher Shyer	Dracula: A Chamber Musical	1997-1998	Musical
Juan Chioran	Dracula: A Chamber Musical	1999	Musical
Tom Hewitt	Dracula, the Musical	2001, 2004-2005	Musical by Frank Wildhorn
Chuck Wagner	Dracula, the Musical	2004-2005	Musical by Frank Wildhorn
Thomas Borchert	Dracula, the Musical	2005-2006	Musical by Frank Wildhorn
Drew Sarich	Dracula, the Musical	2005-2006	Musical by Frank Wildhorn
Andy Vitolo	Dracula, the Musical	2010	Musical by Frank Wildhorn
Yōka Wao	Dracula, the Musical	2011	Musical by Frank Wildhorn
Johan Wikström	Dracula, the Musical	2014	Musical by Frank Wildhorn
Ryu Jung Han	Dracula, the Musical	2014	Musical by Frank Wildhorn
Kim Junsu	Dracula, the Musical	2014	Musical by Frank Wildhorn
Zahra Newman	Dracula	2024	Adapted by Kip Williams
Cynthia Erivo	Dracula	2026	Adapted by Kip Williams

== Television and DTV films ==
Name	Title	Date	Type
Ilja Racek	Hrabě Drakula	1971	Czechoslovak film
Allen Swift	Mad Mad Mad Monsters	1972	Animated special (American)
Jack Palance	Bram Stoker's Dracula	1974	Television film (British)
Louis Jourdan	Count Dracula	1977	Television film (British)
Judd Hirsch	The Halloween That Almost Wasn't	1979	Television film (American)
Zale Kessler	Scooby-Doo and the Ghoul School	1988	Animated television film (American)
Hamilton Camp	Scooby-Doo and the Reluctant Werewolf	1988	Animated television film (American)
French Tickner	Monster Mash	2000	Direct-to-video animated film (Italian-American)
Zhang Wei-Qiang	Dracula: Pages from a Virgin's Diary	2002	Recorded ballet production (Canadian)
Stephen Billington	Dracula II: Ascension	2003	Direct-to-video film, sequel to Dracula 2000 (American-Romanian)
Langley Kirkwood	Dracula 3000	2004	Made-for-television film (American-South African)
Rutger Hauer	Dracula III: Legacy	2005	Direct-to-video film, sequel to Dracula II: Ascension (American-Romanian)
Paul Logan	Bram Stoker's Way of the Vampire	2005	Direct-to-video film (American)
Peter Stormare	The Batman vs. Dracula	2005	Animated film (American)
Marc Warren	Dracula	2006	Television film (British)
Andrew Bryniarski	Bram Stoker's Dracula's Guest	2008	Direct-to-video film (American)
Michael R. Thomas	House of the Wolf Man	2009	American film
Stuart Rigby	Dracula Reborn	2012	Direct-to-video film (American)
Luke Roberts	Dracula: The Dark Prince	2013	American film
Brian Hull	Hotel Transylvania: Transformania	2022	Animated streaming film, "Hotel Transylvania" franchise (American)
Steve Valentine	Monster High: The Movie	2022	Made-for-television/streaming film (Canadian-American)
Steve Valentine	Monster High 2	2023	Made-for-television/streaming film (Canadian-American)
Jake Herbert	Dracula: The Original Living Vampire	2022	Direct-to-video film (American)
Sean Cronin	Wrath of Dracula	2023	Direct-to-video film (British)

== Television series ==
Name	Title	Date	Type
Malcolm Rogers	Doctor Who - "The Chase"	1965	British
Denholm Elliott	Mystery and Imagination - "Dracula"	1968	Feature length TV episode (British)
Hiroshi Ōtake	The Monster Kid	1968-1969	Anime (Japanese)
Kaneta Kimotsuki	The Monster Kid	1980-1982	Anime (Japanese)
Larry Storch	Groovie Goolies	1970-1972	American animated series
Francis Lederer	Night Gallery - "A Question of Fear/The Devil Is Not Mocked"	1971	Segment: "The Devil Is Not Mocked" (American)
Norman Welsh	Purple Playhouse - "Dracula"	1973	TV episode (Canadian)
Henry Polic II	Monster Squad	1976	American series
Bent Børgesen	Draculas ring	1978	Danish miniseries
Christopher Bernau	Broadway on Showtime - "Passion of Dracula"	1980	Televised stage performance
Alan Oppenheimer	Drak Pack	1980	American animated series
Geordie Johnson	Dracula: The Series	1990-1991	American-Canadian series
Joe Flaherty	Little Dracula	1991	American animated series
Robert Bockstael	Monster Force	1994	American-Canadian animated series
Rudolf Martin	Buffy the Vampire Slayer: "Buffy vs. Dracula"	2000	TV episode (American)
Patrick Bergin	Dracula	2002	Miniseries (Italian-German)
Keith-Lee Castle	Young Dracula	2006-2014	TV series (British)
Jonathan Rhys Meyers	Dracula	2013	TV series (British-American)
Christian Camargo	Penny Dreadful	2016	TV series (American-British)
David Berni	Hotel Transylvania: The Series	2017-2019	Animated series, Hotel Transylvania franchise (American)
Ivan Sherry	Hotel Transylvania: The Series	2019	Animated series, Hotel Transylvania franchise (American)
Graham McTavish	Castlevania	2017-2018, 2021	Animated series (American)
Tricia Helfer	Van Helsing	2019-2021	TV series (American-Canadian)
Claes Bang	Dracula	2020	TV serial (British)
Ken Marino	Monster High - "Food Fight/Unfinished Brain-ness"	2022	American animated series

== Theatrical films ==
Name	Title	Date	Type
Max Schreck	Nosferatu	1922	German film
Paul Askonas	Drakula halála	1923	Austrian production
Bela Lugosi	Dracula	1931	Universal's Dracula series (American)
Bela Lugosi	Abbott and Costello Meet Frankenstein	1948	Universal Monsters series (American)
Carlos Villarías	Dracula	1931	Universal's Dracula series (Spanish)
John Carradine	House of Frankenstein	1944	Universal Monsters series (American)
John Carradine	House of Dracula	1945	Universal Monsters series (American)
John Carradine	Billy the Kid versus Dracula	1966	American film
John Carradine	Nocturna: Granddaughter of Dracula	1979	American film
Lon Chaney Jr.	Son of Dracula	1943	Universal's Dracula series (American)
Atif Kaptan	Drakula İstanbul'da	1952	Turkish film
Christopher Lee	Dracula	1958	Hammer's Dracula series (British)
Christopher Lee	Dracula: Prince of Darkness	1966	Hammer's Dracula series (British)
Christopher Lee	Dracula Has Risen from the Grave	1968	Hammer's Dracula series (British)
Christopher Lee	Count Dracula	1970	West German-Italian-Spanish-British co-production
Christopher Lee	Taste the Blood of Dracula	1970	Hammer's Dracula series (British)
Christopher Lee	Scars of Dracula	1970	Hammer's Dracula series (British)
Christopher Lee	Dracula A.D. 1972	1972	Hammer's Dracula series (British)
Christopher Lee	The Satanic Rites of Dracula	1973	Hammer's Dracula series (British)
Christopher Lee	Dracula and Son	1976	French production
Francis Lederer	The Return of Dracula	1958	American film
Allen Swift	Mad Monster Party	1967	Stop-motion animated film (American)
Aldo Monti	Santo en el tesoro de Drácula	1968	Mexican film
Alexander D'Arcy	Blood of Dracula's Castle	1969	American film
Zandor Vorkov	Dracula vs. Frankenstein	1971	American film
Charles Macaulay	Blacula	1972	American film
Howard Vernon	Dracula, Prisoner of Frankenstein	1972	Portuguese-Spanish-Liechtensteiner film
Paul Naschy	Count Dracula's Great Love	1973	Spanish film
Udo Kier	Blood for Dracula	1974	Italian-French film
Dan Meaden	Son of Dracula	1974	British film
John Forbes-Robertson; David de Keyser (voice dub, uncredited); Chan Shen (as Dracula's host)	The Legend of the 7 Golden Vampires	1974	Hammer's Dracula series (British-Hong Kong)
David Niven	Vampira	1974	British film
Gary R. Holstrom	Deafula	1975	American film
Stephen Boyd	Blood for Dracula	1977	West German film
Michael Pataki	Dracula's Dog	1977	American film
Jamie Gillis	Dracula Sucks	1978	American pornographic film
Klaus Kinski	Nosferatu the Vampyre	1979	West German-French film
George Hamilton	Love at First Bite	1979	American film
Frank Langella	Dracula	1979	Adapted from Hamilton Deane's play (British-American)
Miles O'Keeffe	Waxwork	1987	American film
Duncan Regehr	The Monster Squad	1987	American film
Gary Oldman	Bram Stoker's Dracula	1992	American film
Antony Georghiou	U.F.O.	1993	British film
Anthony Crivello	Monster Mash	1995	American film
Leslie Nielsen	Dracula: Dead and Loving It	1995	American-French film
Phil Fondacaro	The Creeps	1997	American film
Gerard Butler	Dracula 2000	2000	American film
Toni Bertorelli	Zora the Vampire	2000	Italian film
Richard Roxburgh	Van Helsing	2004	American-Czech film
Dominic Purcell	Blade: Trinity	2004	American film
Thomas Kretschmann	Dracula 3D	2012	Italian-French-Spanish production
Mitch Powell	Saint Dracula 3D	2012	
Adam Sandler	Hotel Transylvania	2012	Animated film, "Hotel Transylvania" franchise (American)
Adam Sandler	Hotel Transylvania 2	2015	Animated film, "Hotel Transylvania" franchise (American)
Adam Sandler	Hotel Transylvania 3: Summer Vacation	2018	Animated film, "Hotel Transylvania" franchise (American)
Sudheer Sukumaran	Dracula 2012	2013	Indian film
Eliseu Huertas	Story of My Death	2013	Spanish-French-Romanian production
Luke Evans	Dracula Untold	2014	American film
Jason Isaacs	Monster Family	2017	Animated films (German-British)
Jason Isaacs	Monster Family 2	2021	Animated films (German-British)
Thomas Doherty	The Invitation	2022	American film
Nicolas Cage	Renfield	2023	American film
Javier Botet	The Last Voyage of the Demeter	2023	American film
Doug Jones	Nosferatu	2023	American film
Bill Skarsgård	Nosferatu	2024	American film
Caleb Landry Jones	Dracula	2025	French-British-Finnish film

== Video games ==
Name	Title	Date	Type
Jeff Goldblum	Goosebumps: Escape from Horrorland	1996	Live-action segments
Allan Wenger	Dracula: Resurrection	1999	Voice role
Allan Wenger	Dracula 2: The Last Sanctuary	2000	Voice role
Richard Roxburgh	Van Helsing	2004	Voice role
Kevin Delaney	Dracula: Origin	2008	
Robert Carlyle	Castlevania: Lords of Shadow	2010	Part of the Castlevania series
Robert Carlyle	Castlevania: Lords of Shadow – Mirror of Fate	2013	Part of the Castlevania series
Robert Carlyle	Castlevania: Lords of Shadow 2	2014	Part of the Castlevania series

== See also ==
- List of actors who have played Van Helsing
