= Van Helsing (video game) =

2004 video game

- Developer: Saffire
- Publisher: Vivendi Universal Games (Note: Released in PAL regions under the Sierra Entertainment brand name.)
- Designer: Alan Tew
- Programmer: Joel Barber
- Artist: Walter Park
- Composers: Steve Kutay; Tom Zehnder; Cris Velasco
- Platforms: Game Boy Advance, PlayStation 2, Xbox
- Release: NA: May 7, 2004; EU: May 14, 2004
- Genres: Action-adventure, hack and slash
- Mode: Single-player

Van Helsing is an action-adventure video game for the PlayStation 2, Xbox and Game Boy Advance, which is based on the 2004 action horror film of the same name by Stephen Sommers. Hugh Jackman and Richard Roxburgh reprise their roles from the film. The game is one of the few games on PlayStation 2 that can run in 480p.

Whilst the console ports of the game received generally mixed reviews, the Game Boy Advance version of the game was near-universally panned, becoming one of the lowest rated games for the platform on Metacritic.

== Gameplay ==
The PS2 and Xbox versions of the game bears similarity to the Devil May Cry series by Capcom. Van Helsing begins the game wielding two handguns and his Tojo blades. He later acquires various other weapons, some of which are seen in the movie, such as the shotgun and the bow gun. Van Helsing can make use of both his firearms and his blades to dispatch enemies. The player also has the ability to use enhanced ammunition with Helsing's weapons once the ammo is found. Hitting the L1/LT trigger gives Van Helsing a blue-ish glow as he unloads his enhanced ammo. Van Helsing also can perform evasive rolls in four directions to avoid incoming attacks. Van Helsing also has a grappling hook that allows him to latch onto high ledges that are otherwise inaccessible. Van Helsing can make use of this grappling hook to start combos or to perform grappling jumps.

The game also features a shop mechanic where players can purchase additional combat techniques and power-ups to increase health and other characteristics. Items in the shop can be purchased by using "orbs" that are collected from fallen enemies.

The players can even collect the hat after having it knocked off by sustaining a hit from enemies and get points for retrieving the hat prior to completing a mission.

The Xbox version of the game included online leaderboards via Xbox Live. Van Helsing is now supported on revival online servers for the Xbox called Insignia.

== Plot ==
Paris, France

The year is 1887, Van Helsing is in Paris pursuing Dr. Jekyll after he had murdered several men, women, children, goats, and poultry. Prior to confrontation, Dr. Jekyll, using the attic of Notre-Dame de Paris as a lab and a hideout, drank a concoction to transform to Mr. Hyde, becoming bigger, stronger, faster and retaining his memory. Just prior to the ensuing conflict, Mr. Hyde teases Helsing as to him chasing his memories, conveying history between the two and to Helsing not knowing his past. Helsing battles with and ultimately defeats Mr. Hyde by throwing him out of the window of the church. He is assigned to pursue Dracula by the Holy Order, to track down a woman named Anna Velarious, as she can help, but is warned of the outnumbering dead.

St. Peter's Basilica, Vatican

Van Helsing is tasked with tracking down and eliminating evil by the aforementioned Holy Order, headquartered in the Vatican. He is doing this in hopes of correcting forgotten sins and to regain memory. The Order has been protecting humankind "since time immemorial", as said by Cardinal Jinette, the one giving orders to Van Helsing. His next focus is in a town called Vaseria in Transylvania.

Vaseria, Transylvania

After arriving at the train station outside of Transylvania a ghost appears, almost as if asking to be followed. Outside the town of Transylvania he is accosted by skeletons come back to life. After clearing the town of once again living skeletons, Helsing goes to the fountain, where he discovers a large pale man is interwoven cloth robes. This large powerful man attacks the protagonist, but later escapes.

Vaseria Villiage, Transylvania

Van Helsing is tasked to go to a place "most holy and divine", as called by Cardinal Jinette. Upon entering the church he discovers 4 women, three of which are of an unfriendly nature, one is revealed to be Anna Velarious. The three ladies are the Brides of Dracula, who address Van Helsing as if they know him well, leaving him confused as he has no recollection. After defeating one of the women, who turns out to be a vampire close to Dracula, a Bride of Dracula named Marishka, Anna awakens. She was tracking down her missing brother who was bitten by a werewolf and since vanished. She guides Helsing to the library where Velkan was studying Dracula before his disappearance.

Woods, Transylvania

Cardinal Jinette tasks Van Helsing with eliminating Igor, who has been torturing members of the Velarious family. Outside of the library where Velkan Velarious, brother to Anna, was studying Dracula the ghost from the train station appears again. While travelling to the old castle that Igor calls home, the ghost from prior showing appears again, but this time addressing Van Helsing as Gabriel and himself as Velarious, but is quickly dispersed from his ghostly presence by Igor himself, attempting to capture Helsing so his master can have revenge for murdering his bride. Igor evades capture as a werewolf shows itself perched on a rock nearby.

Prince Velkan, Anna's brother was taken by lycanthropy months prior to the arrival of Van Helsing, Velkan now is at the will of Dracula and must be stopped. After defeating Velkan's wolf form he reverts to his human form to inform Van Helsing of the true monster in this area, Dracula and transforms back to werewolf and escapes, Helsing chasing him.

Castle Frankenstein, Transylvania

Van Helsing is on his way to Castle Frankenstein in pursuit of Velkan. In the depths of the castle Van Helsing discovers Draculas plan for producing numerous vampire offspring, but pushes on into the castle. At the top of one of the towers Dracula greets Van Helsing as an ancient friend, addressing him as Gabriel, as well as addressing Van Helsing's forgotten past, murdering Dracula and setting him on this path over 4 centuries ago. Dracula continues to tell how Van Helsing had betrayed him for love so long ago, as they used to be best friends in the Holy Order. During the fight Van Helsing is carried away by the children he encountered earlier by order of Dracula and dropped in to the caverns. The beginning of the encounter is exactly like the movie, Dracula walking on the roof and the wall.

In the caverns under Castle Frankenstein, Van Helsing discovers the robed man that was at the fountain in the town square he fought early after his arrival, who is in fact the monster created by Dr. Frankenstein. Dracula is using the method Dr. Frankenstein used to create the monster to give permanent life to his offspring, otherwise the cannot sustain and expire quickly after birth. They are discovered by the werewolf Velkan and Helsing pursues.

Escaping from the caverns and tracking down the werewolf Velkan, Van Helsing emerges into a courtyard of the castle and fights Velkan in his werewolf form yet again. After presumably defeating Velkan by him falling down a ravine and climbing a tower, Van Helsing crosses the bridge as Anna is carried by a bride further into the castle. After venturing into the castle further chasing the bride, Van Helsing meets Dracula holding Anna hostage in exchange for the Frankenstein monster. Van Helsing declines and Dracula throws Anna into a teleporter and fights Van Helsing once more. During the fight Dracula is about to transform to his vampire form, but gets interrupted by the monster tossing large debris on Dracula.

Castle Frankenstein cannot withstand the destructive power of Dracula and is falling apart quickly prompting Van Helsing to escape. After arriving at the main courtyard Anna greets Van Helsing with a horse-drawn carriage with aim to flee the castle, they are chased by a Bride.

Carriage Ride

Pursuing Van Helsing and Anna en route to Igor to acquire the Key to Castle Dracula on separate carriages, are the remaining two Brides who seek revenge. After attacking Helsing's carriage he abandons it off a cliff and the Brides follow it down a cliff to reveal it was only disguising an improvised vampire killing bomb, not the monster they were looking to acquire for their master Dracula. The bomb ends up killing Verona, a second Bride of Dracula. Prior to ditching his carriage Helsing jumped to Anna's, but a fallen tree in the path forced them to abandon that carriage as well, Anna was grabbed by the remaining Bride, while Velkan has come back for Helsing. After defeating Velkan's werewolf form yet again he informs Helsing of the location of Igor. After sharing the information, Velkan makes one last attack on Helsing, biting him, giving him lycanthropy, then dying.

After pursuing Igor though the forest for the portal key to Castle Dracula and finally encountering him, Van Helsing is approached again by the ghost of Velarious, who addresses him as Gabriel without him having memory.

Castle Dracula

Now in the realm of Dracula's Castle, in pursuit of answers to his past, retribution for past sins forgotten, Van Helsing delves deeper finding Anna bound to a cross. After freeing her she discovers him Van Helsing being bitten and her brother killed in defense. The reunion cut short by the roof collapsing on them, opening the floor below. After continuing deeper into the icy realm of Dracula's Castle, Van Helsing defeats the final Bride of Dracula, Aleera, with a silver stake through the heart. Prior to the battle she had been waiting 400 years for the moment to kill Helsing.

At the top of the tower in Dracula's Castle Helsing finds the Frankenstein monster attached to a mechanism acting as a generator to give life to Dracula's offspring. After freeing him, Van Helsing descends the tower and Dracula is there waiting for him, calling Helsing Gabriel then transforming to his demon form. At the stroke of midnight, Van Helsing (Gabriel), transforms into a werewolf, striking fear into Dracula even in his demon form. After killing Dracula as a werewolf, Anna attempts to cure him but is stricken down and killed in the process. Reverting to human form, Van Helsing blames himself for her death. He watches as her soul leaves.

== Reception ==
Reception

Aggregate score
Aggregator	Score		
Aggregator	GBA	PS2	Xbox
Metacritic	33/100	64/100	63/100

Review scores
Publication	Score		
Publication	GBA	PS2	Xbox
Edge	N/A	N/A	5/10
Electronic Gaming Monthly	N/A	6.5/10	6.5/10
Eurogamer	N/A	6/10	N/A
Famitsu	N/A	29/40	N/A
Game Informer	N/A	7/10	7/10
GameRevolution	N/A	D+	D+
GameSpot	2.2/10	6.9/10	6.9/10
GameSpy	1/5	3/5	3/5
GameZone	3.2/10	7.7/10	7.9/10
IGN	2.5/10	6.5/10	6.5/10
Nintendo Power	2.4/5	N/A	N/A
Official U.S. PlayStation Magazine	N/A	3.5/5	N/A
Official Xbox Magazine (US)	N/A	N/A	6.3/10
Maxim	N/A	6/10	6/10

The PlayStation 2 and Xbox versions received "mixed" reviews, earning a score of 64/100 and 63/100, respectively, while the Game Boy Advance version received "unfavorable" reviews, earning a score of 33/100, according to the review aggregation website Metacritic. The Game Boy Advance version is one of the lowest scored games for the platform on Metacritic.

In Japan, Famitsu gave the PS2 version a score of three sevens and one eight for a total of 29 out of 40. IGN gave the PS2 and Xbox versions of the game a score of 6.5/10, praising the game's combat and positively noting its similarities to the Devil May Cry series, whilst criticizing the poor camera and the reverse difficulty curve the game features, ultimately describing the game as "a fun diversion for an afternoon".

The Game Boy Advance version of the game was generally panned, with its graphics receiving particular scorn. IGN gave the game a 2.5/10, criticizing nearly every element of the game. They specifically called the game "downright ugly", bemoaning the incredibly muddy and pixelated graphics, and panning the engine as unable to "keep up with what the designers throw at it, with tremendous slowdown occurring when four or more enemies show up on-screen."
