= Draculas ring =

Danish television series

Draculas ring (1978) is a Danish TV-miniseries produced by Danmarks Radio and shown only once, with daily episodes from October 15 to October 21, 1978.

The series consists of seven 15-minute episodes, written and directed by Flemming la Cour and Edmondt Jensen, with theme music by Willy Grevelund.

The plot concerns three young Danes spending a vacation in Malta, where they find a coffin sealed with the ring of Count Dracula. They take the ring back home to Denmark, but Dracula rises from his coffin and follows them to reclaim it.

Bent Børgesen starred as Dracula, and local celebrities Anniqa, Rolv Wesenlund and Jørgen de Mylius had cameo roles as vampire victims. Draculas ring was the world's first Dracula-based television series (BBC's Count Dracula (1977) has been aired in two parts on separate dates, thus changing its format from TV-movie to mini-series, but originally premiered complete in one evening with a ten minute intermission).

== See also ==
- Vampire film
- Erotic horror
- List of vampire television series
