= Dracula (Universal film series) =

Universal film series

Dracula is a film series of horror films from Universal Pictures based on the 1897 novel Dracula by Bram Stoker and its 1927 play adaptation by Hamilton Deane and John L. Balderston. Film historians have had various interpretations over which projects constitute part of the Dracula film series. Academics and historians have found narrative continuation between Dracula (1931) and Dracula's Daughter (1936), while holding varying opinions on whether Son of Dracula (1943), House of Frankenstein (1944), and House of Dracula (1945) are part of the series. Author and academic Gary Don Rhodes has stated that all of Universal's Dracula films would require audiences to be familiar with Count Dracula as portrayed by Bela Lugosi, and the various character traits the actor established in the original 1931 film.

The only actor from Dracula to return as a character in any sequel is Edward Van Sloan who returned as Van Helsing in Dracula's Daughter; here renamed Von Helsing. The films following Dracula's Daughter do not continue the narrative set-up by the first two films. House of Frankenstein and House of Dracula feature a Count Dracula who only makes brief appearances in the film with a different appearance and character. Film academics and historians have commented that the narrative inconsistencies were made for commercial reasons, such as Universal wanting to name their new horror films after family members, as was done for Son of Dracula, as they had done with films like Bride of Frankenstein (1935) and Son of Frankenstein (1939). Academic Megan De Bruin-Molé has contested that the inclusion of Count Dracula in House of Frankenstein and House of Dracula was part of Universal's approach to combine their horror characters as they had done with films like Frankenstein Meets the Wolf Man (1943), to establish themselves as the "real" home of horror in the film market. Following the success of the 1931 film and several horror sequels made in the 1940s, various Dracula remakes and follow-ups were announced that never went into production, such as Wolf Man vs. Dracula.

While Dracula (1931) was critically well received on its release, retrospective critical analysis of the film since the 1950s have often criticized the film for being "plodding", "stagebound" and "talkative". The sequels have continued to receive mixed reception with the authors of the book Universal Horrors writing that "by the mid-40s they were on their last legs anyways." The first two films in the series helped establish the tropes and image of classical screen vampire. This take on the cinematic vampire is defined by an unreflecting figure driven by a craving for both the young woman of his desire and for human blood as sustenance. The image of Count Dracula in the first film would not only influence the look of the character in Universal's series, but the look of the character across several films, comic books, and television presentations.

== Overview ==
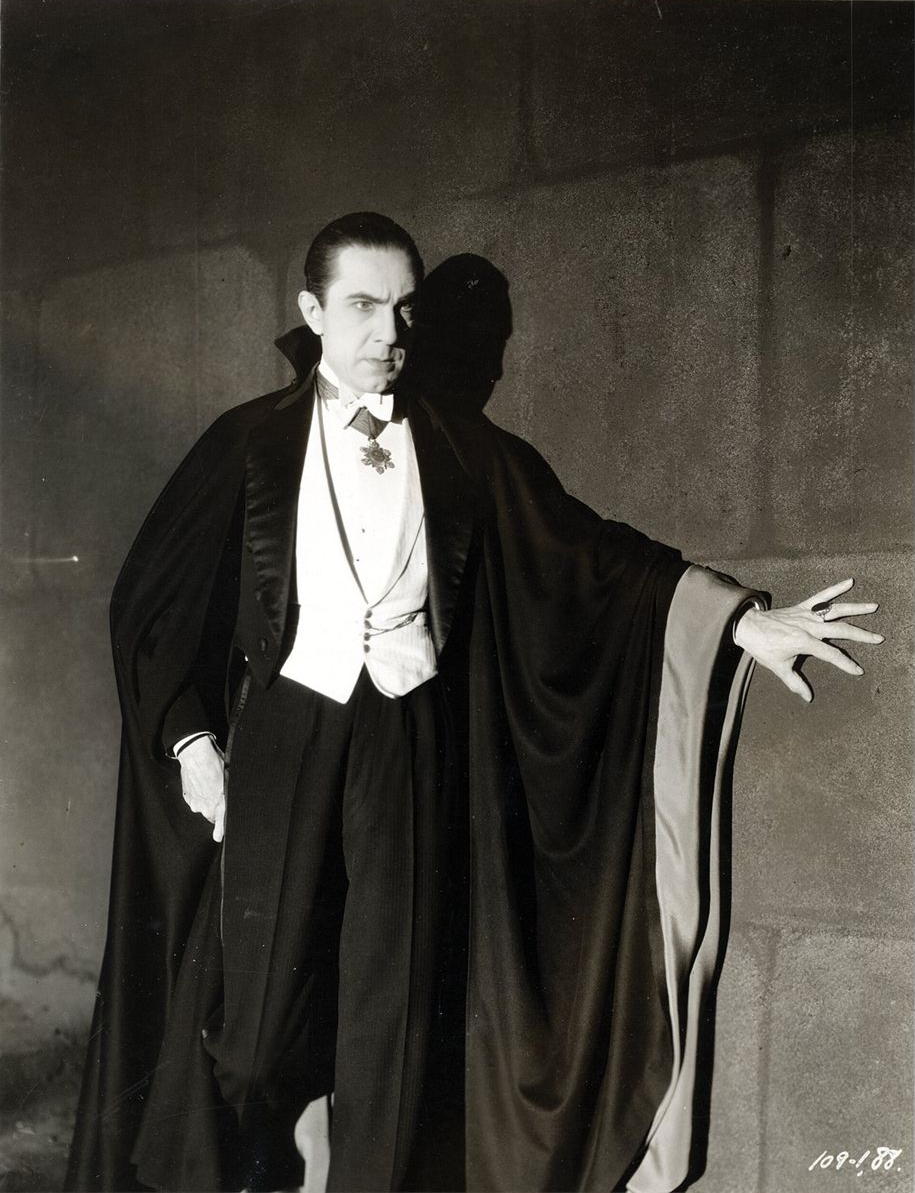
Bela Lugosi as Count Dracula for Dracula (1931). As most of the films in Universal's series do not follow a consistent narrative, Gary D. Rhodes suggested that they all require an audience to be familiar with the character from the 1931 film.

Film historians had various interpretations of what films constituted as Universal's Dracula film series. Ken Hanke wrote in A Critical Guide to Horror Film Series (2014) that Dracula (1931), Dracula's Daughter (1936), and Son of Dracula (1943) were the only films that could "properly be called part of a loosely grouped Dracula series". Gary D. Rhodes included the films House of Frankenstein (1944) and House of Dracula (1945) in his book Tod Browning's Dracula (2014), suggesting that Universal had produced five films in their classic era whose plotlines assume the audience would be familiar with the Count Dracula character from either viewing or being aware of the 1931 film. Rhodes said that the only major consistency with the five films was that Count Dracula and his cohorts exhibited their undead status, a desire to drink blood, and that Dracula preferred to live in older homes and castles. Rhodes wrote that George Melford's Dracula (1931) was only a refraction of English-language film, as it was shot for Spanish-speaking audiences, while the other five Universal films were unique.

Rhodes wrote that following Dracula's Daughter, narrative continuity became increasingly unimportant. Weaver, Hanke and Kim Newman stated that Son of Dracula, House of Frankenstein and House of Dracula takes place outside of any continued narrative from two previous Universal Dracula productions. Lyndon W. Joslin wrote in Count Dracula Goes to the Movies (2017) that Dracula's Daughter is the only film in the Universal series that can be considered in any way a sequel to Dracula (1931) as the rest of the series were narrative departures from anything that's gone before, with Son of Dracula being a stand-alone story. Both Joslin and Hanke wrote that House of Frankenstein and House of Dracula were narratively connected to Universal's Frankenstein series.

Film historian Tom Weaver highlighted narrative inconsistencies such as Prof. Lazlo stating that Count Dracula was destroyed in the 19th century and a press book article from Universal which stated that "although Son of Dracula is not a 'continuation' of [the 1931 Dracula], it is based mainly on the same ghoulish legend of the vampire...." Hanke described the Son of Dracula's relationship to the series as being like a "distant cousin", while Rhodes said that it was as "easy to believe that Son of Dracula's title is nothing more than part of Universal's larger strategy to name horror film sequels after family members" as they had done with films like Bride of Frankenstein (1935) and Son of Frankenstein (1939). Academic Megan De Bruin-Molé suggested the later Universal horror film productions that featured Count Dracula and films like Frankenstein Meets the Wolf Man (1943) from existed as a loose mash-up, which allowed for the film Dracula to exist and be watched separately from Frankenstein (1931) while allowing their characters to be systemically and consistently brought together and developed in other films. She contested that Universal's approach to combining the characters was made for commercial marketing terms, as having all their Universal horror characters together would establish the company as the "real" home of horror in the film market.

In both House of Frankenstein and House of Dracula, Count Dracula only makes token appearances on screen and is quickly disposed of, leading the rest of films plot to focus on The Wolf Man and Frankenstein's monster. Film historian Gregory William Mank noted plot inconsistensies such as House of Frankenstein where the skeleton of Count Dracula is found in Castle Dracula from the mountains of Transylvania while Count Dracula is never destroyed there in any of the previous three Universal productions. Rhodes later suggested that it was possible that that Count Alucard could be the original Dracula in Son of Dracula and that in House of Frankenstein, the character Professor Lampinii exhibits Dracula's skeleton which Rhodes speculated could be the same character from the previous film as Alucard had turned into a skeleton at its conclusion. Count Dracula returns to skeletal form again during House of Frankenstein and how he recovers from that fate to return in House of Dracula (1945) is unknown. This continues in the later productions as Dracula's returns in Abbott and Costello Meet Frankenstein (1948) after he becomes a skeleton again at the end of House of Dracula (1948). In Horror Franchise Cinema (2021), author William Proctor suggested that the Abbott and Costello films are not narrative continuations of the stories established in the previous Universal films, but as parodies or spoof films. He suggested these films "exist outside of continuity (or more accurately, exist as a sub-world within the imaginary network)" as there were no narrative threads to imply that these films should be viewed as transfictions as each film in the Abbott and Costello Meet... series begins as a "tabula rasa", as Abbott and Costello play different characters in each film and showcase no experience meeting any previous characters.

=== Narratives ===
==== Dracula ====
Renfield is a solicitor traveling to Count Dracula's castle in Transylvania on a business matter. The local village people fear that vampires inhabit the castle and warn Renfield not to go there. Renfield enters the castle welcomed by the charming but eccentric Count, who, unbeknownst to Renfield, is a vampire. They discuss Dracula's intention to lease Carfax Abbey in London, where he intends to travel the next day. Dracula hypnotizes Renfield into opening a window, leaving open to an attack from Dracula.

After this, Renfield is found aboard the schooner Vesta, having become a raving lunatic slave to Dracula, who hides in a coffin and feeds on the ship's crew. Renfield is sent to Dr. Seward's sanatorium adjoining Carfax Abbey. At a London theatre, Dracula meets Seward. Seward introduces his daughter Mina, her fiancé John Harker, and the family friend Lucy Weston. Lucy is fascinated by Count Dracula. That night, Dracula enters her room and feasts on her blood while she sleeps. Lucy dies the next day after a string of transfusions. Professor Van Helsing analyzes Renfield's blood and discovers his obsession. Dracula visits Mina, asleep in her bedroom, and bites her. After a meeting with Dracula, Van Helsing finds that he casts no reflection in a mirror and deduces that Dracula is the vampire behind the recent tragedies. After several subsequent interactions, Dracula is hunted by Van Helsing and Harker, who know that Dracula is forced to sleep in his coffin during daylight, and the sun is rising. Van Helsing prepares a wooden stake while Harker searches for Mina. Van Helsing impales Dracula through the heart, killing him.

==== Dracula's Daughter ====
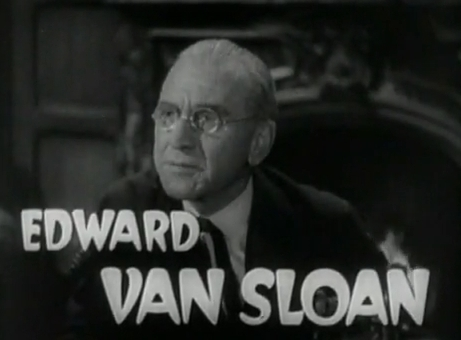
Edward Van Sloan in a film trailer for Dracula's Daughter. Van Sloan was the only actor to appear from the 1931 film in any follow-up.

Dracula's Daughter begins a few moments after Dracula ends. Count Dracula has just been destroyed by Professor Von Helsing. Von Helsing is arrested by two Whitby policemen, Sergeant Wilkes and constable Albert. Von Helsing is sent by the Whitby police to Scotland Yard, where he explains to Sir Basil Humphrey that he indeed did destroy Count Dracula, but because he had already been dead for over 500 years, it cannot be considered murder. Instead of hiring a lawyer, he enlists the aid of a psychiatrist, Dr. Jeffrey Garth, who was once one of his star students. Sergeant Wilkes leaves the Whitby gaol to meet an officer from Scotland Yard at the train station. Meanwhile, Dracula's daughter, Countess Marya Zaleska, enters the gaol and mesmerizes Albert with her jeweled ring and with the aid of her manservant, Sandor, steals Dracula's body from the Whitby gaol and after tossing salt on the pyre ritualistically burns Dracula's body, hoping to break her curse of vampirism. However, Sandor soon begins to discourage her telling her that all that is in her eyes is "death". She soon gives in to her thirst for blood. The Countess resumes her hunting, mesmerizing her victims with her exotic jeweled ring. After a chance meeting with Dr. Garth at a society party, the Countess asks him to help her overcome the influence she feels from beyond the grave. The doctor advises her to defeat her cravings by confronting them.

The Countess gives up fighting her urges and accepts that a cure is not possible; she lures Dr. Garth to Transylvania by kidnapping Janet Blake, his secretary, whom he has a playfully antagonistic relationship with, but now realizes that he cares for her. Zaleska intends to transform Dr. Garth into a vampire to be her eternal companion. Arriving at Castle Dracula in Transylvania, Dr. Garth agrees to exchange his life for Janet's. Before he can be transformed, Countess Zaleska is destroyed when Sandor shoots her through the heart with an arrow as revenge for her breaking her promise to make him immortal. He takes aim at Dr. Garth but is shot dead by a Scotland Yard policeman who, along with Von Helsing, have followed Dr. Garth from London.

==== 1940s features ====
Rhodes wrote that searching for plot consistencies within Universal horror film sequels was as "fascinating as it is infuriating, as important as it is potentially unrewarding". As the films entered the 1940s, vampirism became curable through science as it is learned that the curse is a medical condition.

Son of Dracula is set in the United States, where Count Alucard has just taken up residence. Katherine Caldwell, a student of the occult, becomes fascinated by Alucard and eventually marries him. Katherine begins to look and act strangely leading to her former romantic partner Frank Stanley to suspect that something has happened to her. Frank Stanley confronts the couple and tries to shoot Alucard. The bullets pass through the Count's body and hit Katherine. Frank goes on to the police and confesses to the murder of Katherine. He gets help from Dr. Brewster, and psychologist Laszlo who come to the conclusion that Alucard is a vampire. Katherine sneaks into Frank's cell and explains that she only married Alucard to obtain immortality and wants to share it with Frank, her true love. He is initially repulsed by her idea, but then yields to her. Frank breaks out of prison, seeks out Alucard's hiding place and burns his coffin leaving Alucard to become a skeleton as the sun rises.

In House of Frankenstein, Dr. Gustav Niemann and his assistant Daniel stumble upon traveling showman Professor Lampini, murder him, and take over his exhibit, which includes the recovered corpse of Count Dracula. To exact revenge on Burgomaster Hussman for putting him in prison, Niemann revives Dracula. Dracula hypnotizes Hussman's granddaughter-in-law Rita and kills the Burgomaster. Hussman's grandson notices what is going on and alerts the police, who go after Dracula. Waiting in a nearby carriage, Niemann notices it is Dracula whom the police are after and jettisons Dracula's coffin to flee with Daniel. As Dracula scrambles to get back inside, the sun rises and kills him. In House of Dracula, Count Dracula arrives at the castle home of Dr. Franz Edelmann and explains he has come to find a cure for his vampirism. Dr. Edelmann agrees to help, believing a series of blood transfusions may heal him. The doctor uses his own blood for the transfusions and places the Count's coffin in the basement. The doctor interrupts to explain he has found strange antibodies in the count's blood, requiring further transfusions. During the procedure, the count uses his hypnotic powers to put Edelmann and Nina to sleep. He reverses the flow of the transfusion, sending his own blood into the doctor's veins. When they wake, the count is escaping. Along with Larry Talbot, the two force the count away with a cross; Dracula returns to his coffin as the sun is rising. Edelmann follows him and drags the open coffin into the sunlight, destroying him.

== Production ==
The 1931 English-language Dracula film is based on both the novel by Bram Stoker and the 1927 stage play by Hamilton Deane and John L. Balderston. Universal Pictures had followed the success of the play in London, and bought the rights to the book and play in June 1930 for $40,000. Bela Lugosi, who had performed as Dracula on stage, was cast. Prior to casting Lugosi, Universal would announce other actors for the role including John Wray and had considered Paul Muni. Some reports suggested that Universal's initial choice was that of Lon Chaney, Sr. who was struck with bronchial cancer and died on August 26, 1930. Michael Francis Blake, who wrote three books about Chaney, stated that it would be unlikely that Chaney would have been in Dracula due to his star status at Metro-Goldwyn-Mayer, and that he was having new success in sound film. On February 12, 1931, Dracula premiered. Following its release, Dracula earned Universal $700,000 domestically, almost double its production cost.

After looking at several screenplays and ideas for a sequel, Universal's earliest development on what would become Dracula's Daughter was in 1934 when MGM executive producer David O. Selznick arrived from RKO thinking of developing his own vampire film. Selznick had purchased the rights to Dracula's Guest, a short story by Stoker, and then commissioned a script from Universal writer John L. Balderson as a sequel to Dracula. The development of this film led to many legal difficulties as, legally, the treatment couldn't be filmed by any studio except Universal since it was too close to their 1931 film, which led to Selznick selling off the rights to the story to Universal in September 1934, on the condition that the film be in production by October 1935. This date would be extended several times. The film was initially going to be directed by A. Edward Sutherland, but was eventually directed by Lambert Hillyer. Production finally began on February 4, 1936, just in time to meet the final deadline granted by Selznick. Its final budget became $278,000, which was among the highest for a Universal horror film. It was released on May 11, 1936.

The authors of the book Universal Horrors noted that the studio was "oddly hesitant" to resurrect Dracula, after enthusiastically releasing sequels to their other horror film properties like Frankenstein, The Mummy (1932) and The Invisible Man (1933). Son of Dracula was prepared under different standards at Universal than the previous two films. The company had only restarted production on horror films in 1938 with the film Son of Frankenstein (1939) and Universal's Chairman of the Board J. Cheever Cowdin had been heavily involved in the formation of the company. Profits at Universal by 1941 has been higher than they had been in 1940 while a double bill of both Dracula and Frankenstein in early 1942 was declared to have "staggeringly good business" in the Motion Picture Herald. Following these events, the Daily Variety announced on June 5 that two new horror films were announced with Lon Chaney Jr.: Frankenstein Meets the Wolf Man and Son of Dracula. Son of Dracula was released on October 20, 1943.

Following the release of Frankenstein Meets the Wolf Man on March 5, 1943, a Universal film that never went into production titled Chamber of Horrors was announced by The Hollywood Reporter that would feature characters from their horror films such as the Invisible Man, the Mad Ghoul, the Mummy and "other assorted monsters" on June 7, 1943. A new film featuring Count Dracula was announced in April 1944 with the title Wolf Man vs. Dracula. Bernard Schubert was hired to write the script and turned in his first draft on May 19. Actor Boris Karloff had agreed to return to Universal for a two-film deal, which would include House of Frankenstein (1944). The film began shooting on April 4 and was released on December 15, 1944. The production on House of Frankenstein placed the Wolf Man vs. Dracula's production film on hold. Schubert completed a final shooting script for Wolf Man vs. Dracula that was dated November 30, 1944. Censors again requested several cuts, leading to the production's cancellation and the script being shelved for nearly six months. Producer Paul Malvern had screenwriter, Edward T. Lowe rework the Wolf Man vs. Dracula to a script dated April 13, 1945, which would change dramatically to include Frankenstein's monster and become House of Dracula (1945) which was released on December 7, 1945. On November 28, 1945, British entrepreneur J. Arthur Rank, bought one-fourth interest in Universal. An official merger began on July 31, 1946 with the company, now being called Universal–International.

=== Undeveloped films ===
Along with Wolf Man vs. Dracula, Universal had also announced or planned other Dracula films that never went into production phases. Within three weeks of the release of Dracula, Universal considered no fewer than three ideas for a sequel. These included the following titles submitted to the Hayes Office: The Modern Dracula, The Return of Dracula and The Son of Dracula. None of these films were produced and no information on their potential plot lines is available.

In 1939, Lugosi's friend Manly P. Hall wrote a treatment for an unmade sequel to Dracula that would follow-up after the end of the 1931 film. This film involved Dracula returning to life as Van Helsing had staked the vampire one minute after sundown, an event that would rework the event of the original film. In 1949, Universal had proposed a remake of Dracula that would feature Lugosi. Film industry press only announced that this deal was in "negotiation stages".

== Cast and crew ==
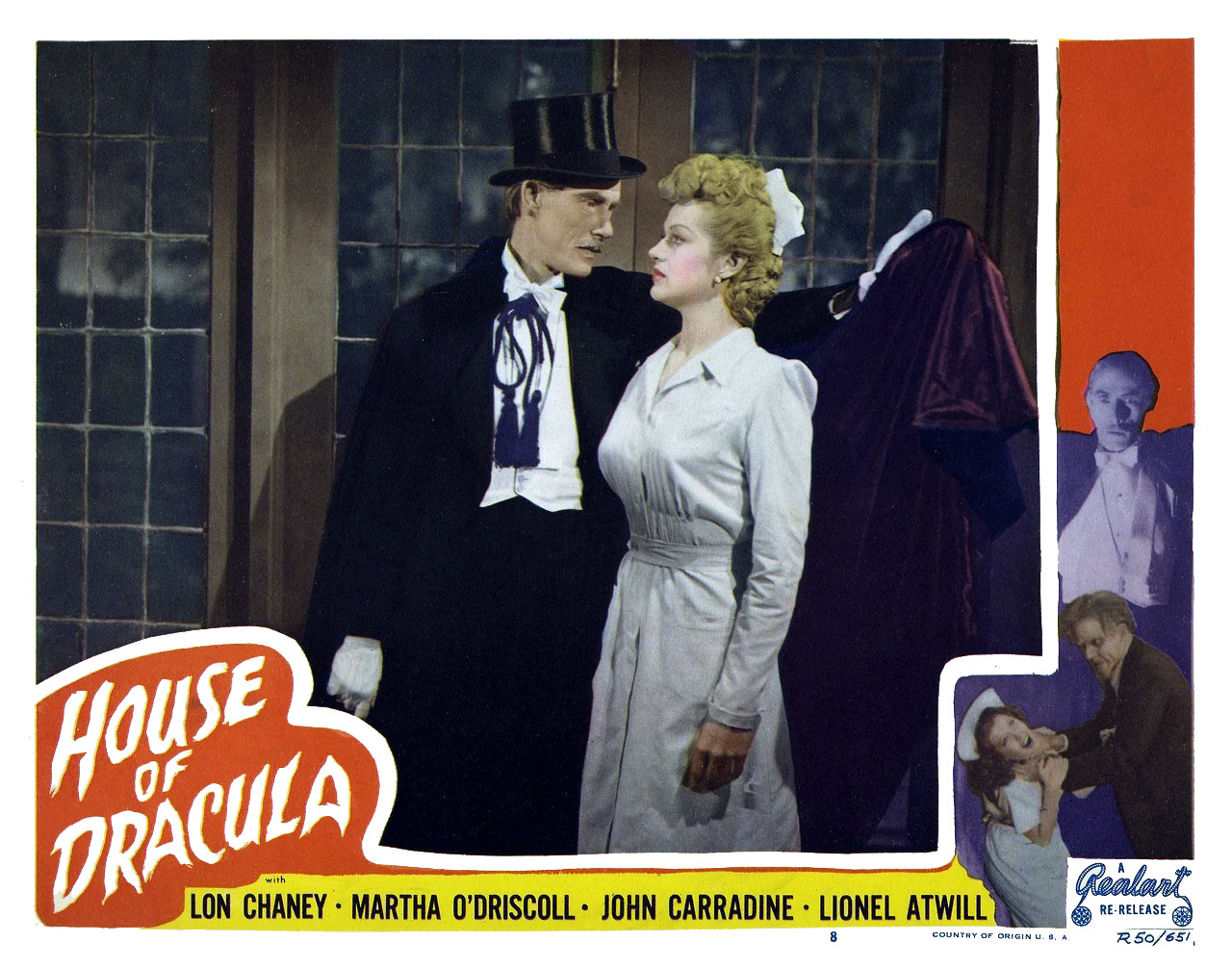
Count Dracula as portrayed by John Carradine in a lobby card for House of Dracula (1944). Carradine said he took the role if the character was closer to his look described in Bram Stoker's novel.

Dracula's Daughter featured more of the original crew of the first film than any subsequent sequel. This included John L. Balderston of the Deane-Balderston team who co-authored the 1927 Broadway play of Dracula, Garrett Fort, co-author of the final shooting script to Dracula, and E. M. "efe" Asher, who was the associate producer on the 1931 film. Universal originally planned to have Lugosi reprise his role in Dracula's Daughter, the final script did not feature his character outside a prop corpse. Dr. Seweard, Mina Seweard and Jonathan Harker do not appear in the sequel. Edward Van Sloan returned as Van Helsing, who is renamed Von Helsing in the film and features a darker hair, different eyeglasses and a different speaking style than he did in Dracula.

Count Dracula is portrayed differently in the later films than he had been by Lugosi in the 1931 film. Rhodes described Count Dracula's character in both House of Frankenstein and House of Dracula as shown as a Southern gentleman with a moustache. Both Hanke and Rhodes found Count Dracula's role in these films to limited in screen time, such as his character only appearing for 15 minutes in House of Frankenstein. John Carradine who portrayed the character in both films said that "when [Universal] asked me to play Dracula, I said yes, if you let me make him up and play him the way Bram Stoker described him - as an elderly, distinguished gentleman with a drooping mustache. [Universal] didn't like a big mustache, so I had to trim it and make it a very clopped, British mustache. It wasn't really in character". Count Dracula was portrayed again by Lugosi in Universal's Abbott and Costello Meet Frankenstein (1948) where Rhodes described his character as less regal than the 1931 film, featuring a Count Dracula doing actions he deemed as being inconceivable of the character in the 1931 film such as being able to run, crash through a door, and throw a flower pot. Author and historian Kim Newman echoed this, finding Count Dracula's plans to place Wilbur Grey's brain into head of Frankenstein's monster made him appear more like a mad scientist in the film.

=== Crew ===
Crew
Crew	Dracula	Dracula's Daughter	Son of Dracula	House of Frankenstein	House of Dracula	Ref(s)
Director	Tod Browning	Lambert Hillyer	Robert Siodmak	Erle C. Kenton	Erle C. Kenton	
Producers	Carl Laemmle Jr.	—N/a	Ford Beebe	Paul Malvern	Paul Malvern	
Screenwriters	Garrett Fort	Garrett Fort	Eric Taylor	Edward T. Lowe	Edward T. Lowe	
Cinematographer	Karl Freund	George Robinson	George Robinson	George Robinson	George Robinson	
Editors	Milton Carruth, Maurice Pivar (Note: Milton Carruth is credited as the editor, Maurice Pivar is credited as the Supervising Editor.)	Milton Carruth, Maurice Pivar	Saul A. Goodkind	Philip Cahn	Russell Schoengarth	
Art director	Charles D. Hall	Albert S. D'Agostino	John B. Goodman and Martin Obzina	John B. Goodman and Martin Obzina	John B. Goodman and Martin Obzina	
Makeup	Jack P. Pierce	Jack P. Pierece and Otto Lederer	Bert Hadley	Jack P. Pierece and Otto Lederer	Jack P. Pierece and Joe Hadley	

== Reception ==
Dracula did not win any major film awards but received several critical accolades on its release. Motion Picture Herald included it in a list of the twenty films that received the greatest amount of exploitation during a six-month period ending on April 25, 1931. When asked to list the Ten Best Pictures of 1931, seventeen critics included Dracula. Retrospective critical analysis of Dracula, since the 1950s had often surrounded the film being "plodding", "stagebound" and "talkative".

Film historians have had varying opinions on the other films in the series. Donald F. Glut discussed the films in The Dracula Book (1975). He wrote the second film in the series better than the 1931 film, and that Son of Dracula was the slickest and most entertaining with the best special effects of any film in the series. William K. Everson in Classics of the Horror Film (1974) found the follow-up Daughter of Dracula could not be considered a major horror film while Son of Dracula was a "restrained, intelligent thriller" and praised the films special effects. John L. Flynn wrote in Cinematic Vampires (1991) described Daughter of Dracula as "largely forgettable" and Son of Dracula as a "further digression in the [Dracula] series" specifically stating Chaney, Jr. was unbelievable as a vampire. The authors of Universal Horrors (2007) found that Dracula's Daughter did not "quite place on the "first tier" of Universal horror classics", and that "there is nothing in Dracula's Daughter to equal the first reels of Dracula in terms of weaving an almost majestic sense of horror". They found Son of Dracula as being "lumped together" with Universal's output from the 1940s, with its reputation generally still lagging behind that of Dracula's Daughter.

House of Frankenstein and House of Dracula were described as often blamed for the decline and demise of the Universal Dracula and Frankenstein series in Universal Horrors, adding that "by the mid-40s they were on their last legs anyways." Glut also said this, finding House of Frankenstein showcased the downward trend of Universal's horror productions and that House of Dracula was a poor attempt to capitalize on the previous films success.

Glut compared the general reception of the series to Hammer's Dracula in 1975, stating that horror film purists had preferred Universal's "atmospheric (and tamer) product" than those of Hammer.

== Legacy ==
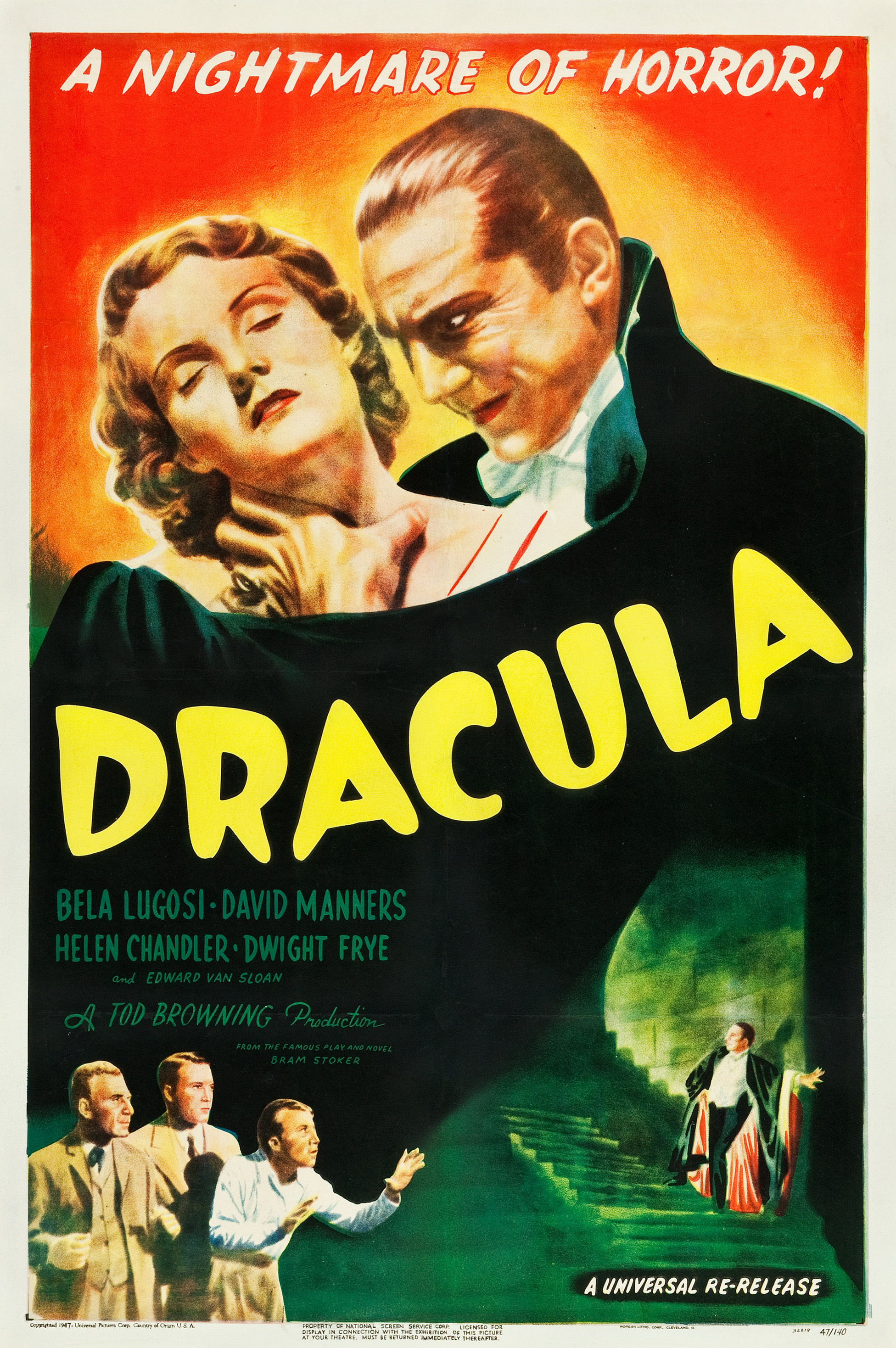
1947 re-issue poster for Dracula (1931). The film helped establish the tropes of the classical screen vampire.

Browning's Dracula (1931) and Dracula's Daughter (1936) along with a cluster of vampire films released between 1931 and 1936 established the classical screen vampire. This take on the cinematic vampire is defined by an unreflecting figure driven by a craving for both the young woman of his desire and for human blood as sustenance. While Nosferatu (1922) was the first significant vampire film, it only developed its considerable prestige, influence and impact over a period of time. Five of the ten films following Dracula between 1931 and 1945 feature vampires inserting themselves between a young, usually engaged, heterosexual couple with the vampire seduces the young woman away from the young man.

Most variations of Count Dracula across film, comic books, television and documentaries predominantly explore the character of Count Dracula as he was first portrayed in film, with only a few adapting Stoker's original narrative. These including borrowing the look of Count Dracula from the 1931 film including include the characters clothing, mannerisms, physical features, hair style which has both been imitated and parodied in various forms. This included both Chaney, Jr. and Carradine in the Universal productions, as well as extending to Francis Lederer in The Return of Dracula (1958), Jack Palance in Bram Stoker's Dracula (1974), Louis Jourdan in Count Dracula (1977), George Hamilton in Love at First Bite (1979), and Frank Langella in Dracula (1979) who all appear visually closer to Lugosi's portrayal than Stoker's description. Director Chris McKay described his film Renfield (2023) as a "quasi-sequel" to the 1931 film. The film features Nicholas Hoult as Renfield and Nicolas Cage as Count Dracula and compositing them into the background of the 1931 film in the place of actors Dwight Frye and Lugosi respectively. Vampires in comic books released before the Comics Code Authority was established in 1954 drew visually from Universal's series.

Other parodies and imitations of Lugosi's Dracula has appeared as early as 1933 with cartoons Mickey's Gala Premiere (1933) and G-Man Jitters (1939) and live-action shorts subjects as Boo! (1932), Hollywood on Parade (1932), and What an Idea (1932). Comedy interpretations of Count Dracula as he was portrayed in both the Hammer and Universal films are seen in various later films including The Fearless Vampire Killers (1967), Love at First Bite (1979) and Buffy the Vampire Slayer (1992) and Dracula: Dead and Loving It (1995).

== See also ==
- The Invisible Man (film series)
- The Mummy (franchise)
- The Wolf Man (franchise)
