= Dracula (Mystery and Imagination) =

- Mystery and Imagination episode
- Episode no.: Series 4 Episode 3
- Directed by: Patrick Dromgoole
- Written by: Charles Graham
- Based on: Dracula by Bram Stoker
- Original air date: 18 November 1968
- Running time: 80 minutes

Guest appearances
- Denholm Elliott; James Maxwell; Susan George; Corin Redgrave; Suzanne Neve; Bernard Archard; Joan Hickson

"Dracula" is a video-taped television play adaptation of Bram Stoker's 1897 novel Dracula, part of the series Mystery and Imagination (Season 4, Episode 3). Denholm Elliott (who later co-starred with fellow-Dracula Jack Palance in The Strange Case of Dr. Jekyll and Mr. Hyde) played Count Dracula with Susan George as Lucy Weston (another alumn of another version of Dr. Jekyll and Mr. Hyde). It is one of the few surviving episodes from the series.

== Plot summary ==
The drama begins in an asylum in Whitby, England. A mysterious patient escapes from his cell and intrudes upon a small party hosted by Dr. Seward, referring to the guest of honor—Count Dracula—as "Master." Moments later he insists he does not know the Count and is led back to his cell. In conversation, it emerges the Count is sensitive to sunlight, has only recently arrived from abroad, and that Seward's fiancee Lucy finds him fascinating.

Dr. Van Helsing comes to consult on the case, and manages to hypnotize the patient, so he recounts in flashback events in Transylvania, including an attack by Dracula's brides.

Denholm Elliott and Susan George

Lucy, meanwhile, greets her old friend Mina Harker, who is distraught over the disappearance of her husband, Jonathan. She is puzzled when Dracula insists that Harker left unharmed months ago. Later, the mysterious patient catches sight of Mina and calls her by name. He is the missing Jonathan Harker.

Dracula visits Lucy at night, feeding on her blood and forcing the two doctors to perform a blood transfusion. Van Helsing recognizes the signs of a vampire attack, but at first refrains from explaining this to Seward. When he does, the English scientist balks, but later comes to suspect Count Dracula of being the vampire. Despite Helsing's efforts, Dracula controls Mrs. Weston to remove the garlic from Lucy's bed. Through Harker, they find out Dracula has attacked her. By the time they get back, it's too late, Lucy dies and begins turning into a vampire.

Lucy is soon buried and Mina goes to pay her respects to her grave. Mina sees Lucy, unaware she is now a vampire, who insists she is happy and ecstatic, offering her the same "joy" as she bites her friend. Lucy vanishes and Dracula appears, offering Mina a chance to be one of the "elect."

Meanwhile, Van Helsing proves to Seward that Lucy has risen from the grave and drives a wooden stake through her heart. Now they focus on finding the vampire's sleeping place. Realizing Harker is under Dracula's power and that Mina has been bitten, they use the two as bait. Following Harker as he leads his wife to Dracula, the two doctors consecrate the grave Dracula has been using then hold him in place with a cross while the sun rises. Dracula dissolves, leaving behind ashes and his ring.

But as the story ends, Mina is staring at Seward's throat and clutches the vampire's ring in her hand. The movie ends with a shot of said ring and an image of Mina on it, now bearing fangs implying she became a vampire despite Harker and Seward's efforts.

== Cast ==
- Denholm Elliott as Count Dracula
- James Maxwell as Dr. Seward
- Corin Redgrave as Jonathan Harker
- Suzanne Neve as Mina Harker
- Bernard Archard as Dr. Van Helsing
- Joan Hickson as Mrs. Weston (Lucy's mother)
- Susan George as Lucy Weston
- Nina Baden-Semper as Vampire
- Michael Da Costa as Jenkins
- Hedley Goodall as Swales
- Tony Lane as Coachman
- Margaret Nolan as Vampire (credited as Marie Legrand)
- Helena McCarthy as Mrs. Hoskins
- Phyllis Morris as Mrs. Perkins
- Valerie Muller as Vampire
- James Pope as Rowse

Differences between novel and adaptation:

- One of Dracula's vampire consorts is a black woman.
- Jonathan Harker is combined with Renfield and dies.
- Quincey Morris and Arthur Holmwood never appear.
- Lucy is known as Lucy Weston.
- The ending is Mina permanently becoming a vampire.

== See also ==
- Vampire film
