= Dracula (The Mercury Theatre on the Air) =

- The Mercury Theatre on the Air episode
- Mark 56 Records release (1976)
- Genre: Radio drama
- Running time: 60 minutes
- Home station: CBS Radio
- Starring: Orson Welles; Elizabeth Fuller; George Coulouris; Agnes Moorehead; Martin Gabel; Ray Collins; Karl Swenson
- Announcer: Dan Seymour
- Written by: Bram Stoker (novel)
- Directed by: Orson Welles
- Produced by: Orson Welles
- Executive producer: Davidson Taylor (for CBS)
- Narrated by: Orson Welles; George Coulouris; Ray Collins; Martin Gabel; Elizabeth Farrell; Agnes Moorehead
- Recording studio: Columbia Broadcasting Building, 485 Madison Avenue, New York
- Original release: July 11, 1938, 9 – 10 pm ET
- Opening theme: Piano Concerto No. 1, by Pyotr Ilyich Tchaikovsky

"Dracula" is an episode of the American radio drama anthology series The Mercury Theatre on the Air. It was performed as the premiere episode of the series on Monday, July 11, 1938, and aired over the Columbia Broadcasting System radio network. Directed and narrated by actor and future filmmaker Orson Welles, the episode was an adaptation of Bram Stoker's 1897 novel Dracula.

== Production ==
"Dracula" was the first episode of the CBS Radio series The Mercury Theatre on the Air, which was broadcast at 8 pm ET on Monday, July 11, 1938.

Recalling Welles's sound-effects preparations for the series debut in a 1940 article for The New Yorker, Lucille Fletcher wrote that "his programs called for all sorts of unheard-of effects, and he could be satisfied with nothing short of perfection." For "Dracula", the CBS sound team searched for the perfect sound of a stake being driven through the heart of the vampire. They first presented a savoy cabbage and a sharpened broomstick for Welles's approval. "Much too leafy," Welles concluded. "Drill a hole in the cabbage and fill it with water. We need blood." When that sound experiment also failed to satisfy Welles, he considered a while—and asked for a watermelon. Fletcher recalled the effect: "Welles stepped from the control booth, seized a hammer, and took a crack at the melon. Even the studio audience shuddered at the sound. That night, on a coast-to-coast network, he gave millions of listeners nightmares with what, even though it be produced with a melon and hammer, is indubitably the sound a stake would make piercing the heart of an undead body.

== Cast ==
The cast of characters of "Dracula" appears in order as first heard in the broadcast.

- Orson Welles - Dracula/Dr. Arthur Seward
- George Coulouris- Jonathan Harker
- Ray Collins - Russian Captain
- Karl Swenson - The Mate
- Elizabeth Farrell - Lucy Westenra
- Martin Gabel - Professor Van Helsing
- Agnes Moorehead - Mina Harker

== Plot summary ==
The drama starts with the introduction of Dr. Arthur Seward, who presents the story based on documents, telegrams, clippings from the press of the day, memoranda, and letters in various hands and begins with excerpts from the private journal of Jonathan Harker. Harker recalls his journey to Dracula's castle with the purpose of sealing a real estate deal for the Count in England. Harker meets his host and hears the wolves howling. Next night Harker begins to shave in his room and gets scared, when Dracula approaches him, as Harker saw no reflection of the Count in the mirror. Jonathan cuts himself, which enrages Dracula, who throws away and breaks Jonathan's mirror. When Harker awakes next morning, he finds most of his possessions are gone and his door is locked from the outside. He also hears that there is some kind of work going on in the castle. That night Jonathan demands to leave and Dracula mockingly opens the door for him, only for the wolves to burst inward. Frightened, Jonathan stays. Next day Jonathan is left completely alone in the castle, as he hears the rolling of heavy wheels and cracking of whips, knowing that it's Dracula's coffins, filled with earth, leaving for England.

Dr. Seward comments that Harker's journal terminates at this point and presents in evidence a clipping from newspaper in Whitby. It's about sudden storm and the crashing of foreign schooner, which rushed with terrific speed toward the shore. A searchlight was turned on her, and there lashed to the helm was a corpse of the captain, with drooping head which swayed horribly to-and-fro at each motion of the ship. At the crash, a huge dog sprang up on deck from below and jumped from the bow onto the sand of the shore and vanished into the night. The Coast Guard going abroad at dawn finds the dead captain fastened to a spoke of the wheel; tightly clutched in one hand was a crucifix. In the pocket of the dead man's coat was found a bottle, carefully corked, containing a roll of paper. This proves to be an addendum to the ship's log. The log of the ship Demeter tells the story of its doomed journey, the disappearance of the crew one by one, and of the captain intending not to leave the ship no matter what. There is found on board only a small amount of cargo: the ship carried nothing but earth, common earth, packed away in wooden boxes - shaped much like coffins.

Later Dr. Seward telegraphs to his former mentor, Dr. Van Helsing in Amsterdam, to come to England and examine Seward's fiancée Lucy Westenra. Lucy is very ill, chalkly pale, the bones of her face stand out, but Seward can't diagnose what's wrong with her. Van Helsing arrives, finds two marks on Lucy's throat and tells Seward she is in great danger. He orders Seward not to leave Lucy alone. Seward sits by Lucy's side all night, while she sleeps, and hears like a bat or something like that flaps against the window pane. Next day Seward receives a message from Purfleet, requesting his urgent presence in London, and leaves. That night Dracula breaks into Lucy's room through the window and drains her. The next day Seward and Van Helsing find Lucy on the floor dying. She beckons Seward to her and asks him to kiss her, but Van Helsing stops him. Lucy screeches and dies. Soon they read in newspapers about strange cases involving young children straying from home or failing to return from playing near Hampstead. In all these cases, the children have given as their excuse that they have been with 'a beautiful lady' who offered them chocolates. In each case, the child was found to be slightly torn or wounded in the throat. Van Helsing leads Seward to cemetery, where Lucy is buried, and they hide near her tomb. They see a strange figure carrying a child, whom she abandons when she notices them. They enter the tomb, see vampire Lucy in her coffin and under Van Helsing's persuasion Seward stakes her.

Seward reveals that a man was found on the border of Transylvania, who talked wildly of wolves and boxes of earth and blood. His name is Jonathan Harker. He was brought to England and committed for observation to a private ward in Seward's hospital at Purfleet. It is during this time that his wife, Mina Harker, brought to the attention of Dr. Van Helsing and Seward the journal that her husband had kept while the prisoner in the castle of a certain Count Dracula in Transylvania. Van Helsing, Seward, Harker and Mina all gather together to discuss how to defeat Dracula. From the Count's castle in Transylvania to Whitby came 50 boxes of earth. All of these were delivered at Carfax. Recently, 12 of these boxes have been removed. Van Helsing says they need to ascertain whether all the rest remain in the deserted house next door or whether anymore have been removed, then they need to sterilise the earth in the boxes with holy water so the vampire can no longer seek safety in it. The men leave Mina home alone and go to Carfax, where they find only 38 of the boxes, each one of them sterilised. Meanwhile, Mina has a strange dream - white mist creeping into the room and gaslight looking only like a tiny red spark in the fog. Then the spark divides and seems to shine on Mina through the fog like two red eyes.

The next day men track down the remaining 12 boxes at an empty house at Piccadilly. They encounter Dracula himself there, who says to them that Mina is his already, his mark is on her throat and that she is with him always, over land or sea! Dracula disappears and the heroes can't find his last box. Mina falls in some sort of trance, repeating the exact words Dracula said at the house at Piccadilly, so the heroes understand Mina has connection to Dracula now. Van Helsing hypnotises Mina and they find out that Dracula has left England on the ship and is heading back to Transylvania. The heroes all follow him by land across Europe, Van Helsing keeps hypnotising Mina. They reach Transylvania and split up - Harker and Seward charter steam launch and follow Dracula up the river. Van Helsing and Mina take a train to Veresti and from there go to Bistritz over to Borgo. At the sunset Mina and Van Helsing see the Slovaks, with their heavy wagon, being chased by Harker and Seward. The wagon smashes into a great rock buried in the snow, loses its front wheels, and turns over on its side. The horses tear loose from their tracers and bolt, and the Slovaks scatter and vanish after them. Van Helsing screams for Harker to stake Dracula's heart. Mentally Dracula begins to call out to his animal servants to protect him and raises storm. The heroes do not hear him, but Mina hears. Dracula calls out to Mina, calling her his bride and “my love” and asks her to help him. Mina tears the stake and the hammer out of Jonathan's hands, and stakes Dracula herself. The vampire’s whole body crumbles into dust.

The radio drama concludes with Orson Welles saying that in case Count Dracula has left the audience a little apprehensive, when people go to bed tonight, they shouldn't worry, just put out the lights and go to sleep, but should always remember... and continues in his Dracula voice “Ladies and gentlemen, there are wolves, there are vampires! Such things do exist.“
