= Count Dracula (1977 film) =

1977 British TV film by Gerald Savory

- Louis Jourdan as Count Dracula
- Based on: Dracula by Bram Stoker
- Written by: Gerald Savory
- Directed by: Philip Saville
- Starring: Louis Jourdan; Frank Finlay; Susan Penhaligon; Judi Bowker; Mark Burns; Jack Shepherd
- Music by: Kenyon Emrys-Roberts
- Country of origin: United Kingdom
- Original language: English

Production
- Producer: Morris Barry
- Editors: Richard Bedford (film inserts); Rod Waldron (videotape)
- Running time: 155 minutes

Original release
- Network: BBC2
- Release: 22 December 1977

Count Dracula is a British television adaptation of the 1897 novel Dracula by Bram Stoker. Produced by the BBC, it first aired on BBC2 on 22 December 1977. It is among the more faithful of the many adaptations of the original book. Directed by Philip Saville from a screenplay by Gerald Savory, it stars Louis Jourdan as Count Dracula and Frank Finlay as Professor Abraham Van Helsing.

== Plot ==
Lucy Westenra's sister Mina bids farewell to her fiancé Jonathan Harker, a solicitor travelling to Count Dracula's castle in Transylvania to expedite his purchase of Carfax Abbey and other properties in England.

On the penultimate leg of Harker's trip, a fellow-passenger warns him not to go to Dracula's castle. She gives him her rosary for protection. Harker is dropped off at the Borgo Pass in the dead of night, and is picked up a few moments later by the Count's coach. At the castle's door, Count Dracula welcomes Jonathan and easily carries his heavy trunk up to his room. Jonathan reluctantly agrees to stay for a month. Dracula is gracious, but he has sharp fingernails, hair on his palms, and casts no reflection. After an encounter with Dracula's brides, Harker finds the Count and his brides' sleeping quarters in a crypt, with their eyes open, yet seemingly unaware of his presence. Harker tries to kill Dracula with a shovel to no effect before fleeing the castle.

In England, Mina and Lucy go to the seaside town of Whitby. Among their friends are Lucy's American fiancé Quincey Holmwood, and Dr. John Seward, who operates a local asylum. Among Seward's patients is the madman R. M. Renfield, who worships and fears Dracula. Mina and Lucy witness a storm in which the ship Demeter goes aground. It is carrying Dracula (in the form of a wolf) and many wooden boxes filled with earth from his home. That same night, a local seaman is found dead, a victim of the vampire. Mina follows a sleepwalking Lucy to the local graveyard and glimpses Dracula embracing her. Lucy grows pale and weak; at night in her bedroom, Dracula drinks her blood on several occasions. Jonathan, meanwhile, turns up delirious and exhausted in a convent in Budapest.

Seward summons his friend Abraham Van Helsing from Amsterdam to help with Lucy's strange illness. Although Van Helsing recognizes the symptoms and wards her bedroom with garlic, a wolf shatters the window. The shock kills Lucy's mother, and Lucy is found pale and nearly dead after another encounter with Dracula. Despite Van Helsing's efforts, she dies, but not before displaying signs of vampirism, such as a missing reflection and an uncharacteristic seductiveness and aggression when Holmwood comes to see her in her final moments.

Seward accompanies Van Helsing to Lucy's empty grave. She has bitten a lost child. An incredulous Holmwood returns with them to Lucy's family crypt and find her perched atop it. Now a vampire and feral, Lucy attempts to seduce Holmwood, but is forced to flee from Van Helsing's crucifix. Later, in the tomb, Holmwood drives a wooden stake into Lucy's heart. Van Helsing fills her mouth with garlic and cuts off her head.

Harker, Van Helsing, Seward and Holmwood all go to Carfax Abbey to sterilize Dracula's refuges—the boxes of soil from his native Transylvania – with parts of the host used in the Eucharist. Renfield realizes Dracula is now visiting Mina, and seeks to warn her and Seward. Enraged, Dracula kills Renfield, who just manages to warn the others. They rush to find Mina in her bedroom, drinking blood from Dracula's chest. Dracula vanishes as they enter. Van Helsing touches the hysterical Mina's forehead with a piece of a host, which scars her; she declares herself "unclean".

The Count flees back to his castle after losing all his other resting places; the friends follow. Van Helsing and Mina go to the castle, while the others pursue the gypsies transporting Dracula's coffin. In the Transylvanian wilderness, Dracula's brides attempt to attack Van Helsing and Mina, but Van Helsing thwarts them with the host, and destroys them the following day. Harker, Seward, and Holmwood chase Dracula's carriage and fight the gypsies loyal to Dracula; Mina shoots one, saving Harker, but Holmwood is fatally wounded. The pursuers reach and open the coffin; inside, Dracula smiles because it is almost sunset. Realizing they have only moments left, Van Helsing mounts the carriage and drives a stake into the vampire's heart; the body disintegrates in a violent burst of smoke, leaving only his clothes and ashes. Mina's vampirism disappears, as does the scar on her forehead, and the group says a prayer of thanks.

== Cast ==
- Louis Jourdan as Count Dracula
- Frank Finlay as Professor Abraham Van Helsing
- Susan Penhaligon as Lucy Westenra
- Judi Bowker as Wilhemina (Mina) Harker
- Mark Burns as Doctor John Seward
- Jack Shepherd as R. M. Renfield
- Bosco Hogan as Jonathan Harker
- Richard Barnes as Quincey P. Holmwood

Additional cast members include Ann Queensberry as Mrs. Westenra, George Raistrick as Bowles, George Malpas as Swales, and Michael MacOwan as Hawkins. Sue Vanner, Susie Hickford, and Belinda Meuldijk portray Dracula's Brides. The passengers on Harker's stagecoach are portrayed by Bruce Wightman, Izabella Telezynska, and Orla Pederson.

== Production ==
Louis Jourdan's casting surprised critics, but, speaking to the Radio Times in 1977, Philip Saville explained that he saw Dracula as "a romantic, sexually dashing anti-hero in the tradition of those figures usually dreamed up by women... Rochester, Heathcliff... figures that can overpower a strong heroine, inhuman figures that can't be civilised."

Jourdan said of playing Dracula in interview, "What is so interesting in playing Dracula is that I try to make monstrosity, or, if you prefer, villainy, attractive, very attractive. If we succeed in that, we have won our day. If the audience can be troubled enough to say that maybe Dracula is right in what he says, then we have won... He is an angel, a fallen angel. I think Dracula should be played as an extremely kind person, who truly believes he is doing good. He gives eternal life. He takes blood and he gives blood. Therefore, he gives an exchange which is symbolic of love and the sexual act, such as in the scene we were just doing [in which Dracula gives his blood to Mina Harker]."

== Transmission history ==
Count Dracula was originally shown on BBC2 in the UK in its entirety (155 minutes) on 22 December 1977. It was repeated twice in 1979, the first time on BBC2 in January and again on BBC 1 in December. On both of these occasions, it was split into three episodes and shown on three consecutive nights. It was repeated again on BBC2 in April 1993 when it was shown in two parts.

In the United States, Count Dracula was shown as part of PBS's Great Performances anthology series in three parts starting on 1 March 1978.

== Reception ==
Critical reaction to Count Dracula has been mostly positive. Writing in The Guardian, TV critic Nancy Banks-Smith stated it was "A nice plushy production with much galloping off in all directions and sulphurous smoke effects, a pleasant sensation of space and time and money. Something of a hole in the middle though, like a vampire after remedial treatment." She was less positive about the casting and performance of Louis Jourdan, however, which she felt "emphasised the lover at the expense of the demon. It makes a change. Though, I would say, for the worst".

Film historian Stuart Galbraith IV said that "Count Dracula remains one of the best-ever adaptations of Bram Stoker's novel" despite a "couple of missteps", remarking that "the cast is excellent", in particular praising the performances of Frank Finlay and Jourdan, whom he calls "especially good." Critic Steve Calvert agreed that Count Dracula was "one of the better versions" of Stoker's novel, calling it "perhaps even the best." He felt that "few actors have ever played the role [of Abraham Van Helsing as] convincingly" as Finlay, that "without doubt, [Jack Shepherd is] the best on-screen embodiment there has ever been of the fly-munching Renfield", and remarked of Jourdan's performance, "[His] Dracula ... exudes a quieter kind of evil. A calculating, educated evil with a confidence and purpose all of its own."

In his book Hollywood Gothic: The Tangled Web of Dracula from Novel to Stage to Screen, David J. Skal calls Count Dracula "the most careful adaptation of the novel to date, and the most successful." Brett Cullum of DVD Verdict said the special effects were this version's "biggest downfall" and that it was "perhaps the least visually interesting" Dracula adaptation, though he offered a mostly positive review, remarking that there is "plenty to admire in the production", in particular the "sublime acting". MaryAnn Johanson of FlickFilosopher.com was less positive, writing: "Maybe it had more of an impact in the 70s ... but today, while it remains a stylishly surreal reinterpretation of Bram Stoker’s novel, there’s something a bit dated and stodgy about it".

== Home video ==
In 2002, BBC Learning released Count Dracula on DVD, for sale by direct mail order in the UK only. It was released commercially by BBC Video in 2007.

== See also ==
- Vampire films
