= Dracul =

Dracul may refer to:

- Vlad II Dracul (1390s–1447), a Wallachia noble, father of the figure later known as "Vlad the Impaler",
- Mircea III Dracul, a prince of Wallachia
- Dracul (novel), a 2018 prequel to Bram Stoker's Dracula written by Dacre Stoker and J. D. Barker

== See also ==
- Dracu (disambiguation)
- Dracula (disambiguation)
- Drăculea (disambiguation)
- Valea Dracului (disambiguation)
