= Dracula (disambiguation) =

Dracula is an 1897 novel by Bram Stoker.

Dracula or Count Dracula may also refer to:

- Count Dracula, the title character in the novel
- Vlad the Impaler (1431–1476), or Vlad Dracula, or Draculea, ruler of Wallachia

== Arts and entertainment ==
=== Film and television ===
==== Film ====
- Dracula (Universal film series)
  - Dracula (1931 English-language film) starring Bela Lugosi
  - Dracula (1931 Spanish-language film) starring Carlos Villarías
- Dracula (Hammer film series)
  - Dracula (1958 film) starring Christopher Lee
- Count Dracula (1970 film), a non-Hammer film starring Christopher Lee
- Count Dracula (1977 film), a BBC TV production
- Dracula (1979 film), starring Frank Langella
- Bram Stoker's Dracula (1992 film), starring Gary Oldman
- Dracula (2006 film), a TV adaptation
- Dracula Untold (2014 film), starring Luke Evans
- Dracula (2025 Romanian film), a Romanian film directed by Radu Jude
- Dracula (2025 French film), a French film directed by Luc Besson

==== Television ====
- Bram Stoker's Dracula (1974 film), a British television film, starring Jack Palance
- Dracula (Mystery and Imagination), a 1968 television play adaptation
- Dracula: The Series, a 1990 Canadian syndicated series
- Dracula (miniseries), a 2002 Italian series
- Dracula (2013 TV series), by Cole Haddon and Daniel Knauff
- Dracula (2020 TV series), by Mark Gatiss and Steven Moffat
- Dracula, a 2021 Iranian home video by Mehran Modiri

=== Gaming ===
- Dracula (pinball), a 1979 pinball machine
- Dracula (1983 video game)
- Dracula (1986 video game)
- Dracula (Castlevania), a character in Castlevania video games
- Vlad Tepes Dracula, a 1997 strategy game

=== Music ===
- Dracula (album), a 1999 soundtrack performed by Kronos Quartet, with music by Philip Glass, for the 1931 film
- "Dracula" (song), by Tame Impala, 2025
- "Dracula"/"The Rose", a 1989 single by the Dutch band Claw Boys Claw
- Dracula, a 1979 soundtrack by John Williams
- "Dracula", a song by Gorillaz from the US version of the 2001 album Gorillaz
- "Dracula", a song by Iced Earth from the 2001 album Horror Show
- "Dracula", a song by Sharon Needles from the 2015 album Taxidermy
- "Dracula", a 2011 song by the British band Basement Jaxx
- "Dracula", a 2014 song by Bea Miller from the 2015 album Not an Apology
- "Dracula", a song by f(x) from the 2014 album Red Light
- "Dracula", a song by Nessa Barrett from the 2026 album Tough Love

=== Plays and musicals ===
- Dracula (1924 play), by Hamilton Deane and John L. Balderston
- Dracula (1995 play), by John Godber and Jane Thornton
- Dracula (1996 play), by Steven Dietz
- Dracula (a feminist revenge fantasy), a 2020 play by Kate Hamill
- Dracula (Czech musical), 1995
- Dracula: A Chamber Musical, 1997, by Richard Ouzounian and Marek Norman
- Dracula, the Musical, 2001, by Frank Wildhorn, Don Black and Christopher Hampton
- Dracula – Entre l'amour et la mort, a 2006 musical by Bruno Pelletier
- Dracula – L'amour plus fort que la mort, a 2011 musical by Kamel Ouali

=== Other uses in arts and entertainment ===
- Dracula (comics), several characters in comics
- Dracula (The Mercury Theatre on the Air), a 1938 radio episode of The Mercury Theatre on the Air
- Grandpa (The Munsters), or Sam Dracula, a fictional character
  - Lily Munster, born Lily Dracula

== Other uses ==
- Dracula (plant), a genus of orchids
- Dracula (CAD software), by ECAD Inc. for electronic design automation
- Dracula (color scheme)

== See also ==
- Alucard (disambiguation) ("Dracula" spelled backwards)
- Dacula, Georgia, a suburb of Atlanta
- Dr. Acula (disambiguation)
- Dracu River (disambiguation)
- Dracul (disambiguation)
- Count Dracula in popular culture
- Vlad II Dracul (died 1447), Prince of Wallachia and Governor of Transylvania
- Ottomar Rodolphe Vlad Dracula Prince Kretzulesco (1940–2007), German socialite
- Bram Stoker's Dracula (disambiguation)
