= Dracu =

Dracu may refer to the following rivers in Romania:

- Dracu, a tributary of the Baleia in Hunedoara County
- Dracu, a tributary of the Olteț in Gorj County
- Dracu, a tributary of the Tărlung in Brașov County

== See also ==
- Dracul (disambiguation)
- Dracula (disambiguation)
- Drăculea (disambiguation)
- Valea Dracului (disambiguation)
