= Crack My Nut =

Studio album by Claw Boys Claw
- Released: 1987
- Recorded: 1987
- Genre: Rock and roll
- Label: Polydor LP: 833 436-1; CD: 833 436-2
- Producer: Victor Van Vugt

Claw Boys Claw chronology
Claw Boys Claw 3 in 1 (1987)	Crack My Nut (1987)	Hitkillers (1988)

Crack My Nut is the third studio album by Dutch rock and roll band Claw Boys Claw. This was their last album on Polydor, which terminated the band's record deal the next year, citing disappointing sales. The album was recorded when the band's popularity was reaching a high point. The band had played all over Europe (including the Roskilde Festival) and had gained a strong reputation as a live band. Crack My Nut was produced by the Australian producer Victor Van Vugt, and was recorded in the Hansa Tonstudio in Berlin.

While Polydor may have been disappointed with the album's sales (it never charted), the band had a very successful year, winning the prestigious BV Popprijs and having their debut album, Shocking Shades of Claw Boys Claw, re-released by Polydor.

== Track listing ==
No.	Title	Length
1.	"Teenage Heartattack" (Te Bos/Cameron/Rossini/Jolles)
2.	"Mistress of Seduction" (Te Bos/Cameron/Rossini/Jolles)
3.	"Barbiedolls" (Te Bos/Cameron/Rossini/Jolles)
4.	"Get Up" (Te Bos/Cameron/Rossini/Jolles)
5.	"Not Comin' Home" (Te Bos/Cameron/Rossini/Jolles)
6.	"Monoman" (Te Bos/Cameron/Rossini/Jolles)
7.	"Madcat" (Te Bos/Cameron/Rossini/Jolles)
8.	"Sunset 'B" (Te Bos/Cameron/Rossini/Jolles)
9.	"Clawcry" (Te Bos/Cameron/Rossini/Jolles)
10.	"Like Lovers Do" (Te Bos/Cameron/Rossini/Jolles)
11.	"Save Me" (Te Bos/Cameron/Rossini/Jolles)
12.	"The Clapman" (Te Bos/Cameron/Rossini/Jolles)
13.	"Gimme A Break" (Te Bos/Cameron/Rossini/Jolles)

- Tracks 6 and 12 only on the CD version.

== Personnel ==
- John Cameron – guitar
- Pete TeBos – vocals
- Bobbie Rossini – bass
- Marius Schrader – drums
- Victor Van Vugt – producer
- Recorded at Hansa Tonstudio, Berlin

== See also ==
- Claw Boys Claw discography
