= Dracula the Undead =

Dracula the Undead may refer to:

- Dracula the Un-dead, a 2009 novel written by Dacre Stoker and Ian Holt
- Dracula the Undead (novel), a 1997 novel written by Freda Warrington
- Dracula the Undead (video game), a video game released in 1991 for the Atari Lynx handheld system
