= Dirty Dog =

Dirty Dog may refer to:

== Music ==
- Dirty Dog (album), a 1966 album by Kai Winding
- "Dirty Dog", a song by Claw Boys Claw from Shocking Shades of Claw Boys Claw (1985)
- "Dirty Dog", a song by Damn Yankees from Don't Tread (1990)
- "Dirty Dog", a song by Juliana Hatfield from In Exile Deo (2004)
- "Dirty Dog", a song by Switchblade Symphony from Bread and Jam for Frances (1997)
- "Dirty Dog", a song by ZZ Top from Eliminator (1983)
- "Dirty Dog", a song by The Beastie Boys from Hello Nasty

== Television ==
- Don's Dirty Dog Wash, a fictional franchise from the series Very Small Business
- "Dirty Dog", an episode of the series Pocoyo
- "Dirty Dog", an episode of the series Rocko's Modern Life
- "Dirty Dog", an episode of the series Teletubbies

== Literature ==
- Dirty Dog, a fable credited to Aesop

== Fictional Characters ==
- Dirty Dog, a character in the first solo-storyboard created by Joseph Barbera in 1935
- Dirty Dog, a character from the comic book series Top Dog
- Dirty Dog, a character from the Internet cartoon The Goddamn George Liquor Program
- Dirty Dog, a character from the Internet cartoon Weekend Pussy Hunt
- Dirty Dog, a character from the underground comix Zap Comix

== See also ==
- Dirt Dog (disambiguation)
