= Pajama Day (album) =

Album by Claw Boys Claw

Pajama Day is a 2008 album by the Dutch rock band Claw Boys Claw, their first album since 1997's Will-O-The-Wisp.

== Background ==
After a long period of inactivity, there were rumors in the spring of 2006 that the Claw Boys Claw were working on a new album and wanted to start touring again. According to singer Peter Te Bos, he and guitarist John Cameron had written some seventy songs since 2002. Some of those songs were released in February 2008 on Pajama Day, on the independent label Play It Again Sam.

== Reviews ==
The album was welcomed by critics, who hailed their lyrical maturity, honesty, and musical ability. Most critics noted that the Claw Boys Claw had dialed down the volume in comparison to their earlier records, but still praised the album. Belgian weekly HUMO said that the album contained the most exciting rock songs they had heard in years, praised Cameron's guitar work, and gave it four out of five stars. While the reviewer from De Recensent found only three worthwhile songs on the CD, the Dutch paper de Volkskrant thought it a brooding and dark album containing "beautiful secrets." Dutch music magazine Muziekkrant OOR concurred, calling the album "swamp rock" full of tension, and "a record to take to bed."

== Track list ==
(All songs by Peter te Bos, except otherwise noted)

1. "I Am Sea" – 3:18
2. "Halibut" – 3:16
3. "Sleepwalking" – 4:50
4. "Toscamoon" – 3:28
5. "Julie's Name" – 2:31
6. "Rock Me Girl" – 3:30
7. "Lava" – 2:51
8. "Seven Fools" – 5:29
9. "Flower" – 3:46
10. "Yellow Car" – 2:05
11. "Wonderful" – 3:48
12. "Trust Me" – 4:34
13. "Dream a Little Dream of Me" (Fabian André/Gus Kahn/Wilbur Schwandt) – 3:31

== Personnel ==
- Peter Te Bos – vocals
- John Cameron – guitar, keyboards
- Marcus Bruystens – bass
- Marc Lamb – drums
- Chris van Veghel – vocals ("Rock Me Boy")
- Ro Halfhide – backing vocals ("Yellow Car")

=== Production ===
Recorded and mixed in Amsterdam, in 2007, at John's Closet and Frank van der Weij Studio, in Amsterdam.

- Frank Van Der Weij – engineer, mastering, mixing, production
- Remco Schouten – engineer
- Peter Te Bos – artwork
