= Claw Boys Claw discography =

- Studio albums: 10
- Compilation albums: 2
- Singles: 17

The discography of the Claw Boys Claw, a rock and roll band from the Netherlands active since 1984, comprises a dozen albums and more than a dozen singles. After two independent releases, the band signed with Polydor. After three albums for EMI in the early nineties and one more in 1997, the band went into semi-retirement, from which it emerged in 2008, now under contract with Play It Again Sam (PIAS). As a result of the band's renewed activity, PIAS reissued the band's debut album, and EMI reissued a number of albums from the 1990s.

== Albums ==
Title	Released	Label(s)	Format(s)	Notes
Shocking Shades of Claw Boys Claw	May 1984	Hipcat	LP (#HIP 1234)	Reissued on LP by Polydor, 24 November 1986 (#831 439-1). Reissued on CD in June 2008 by PIAS (#900.0809.020), with five additional songs (from "So Mean" (single) and Indian Wallpaper (12")
Now!	1985	Hipcat	12" (#HIP 5678)	Recorded live at the Melkweg, Amsterdam, 29 November 1984.
With Love From The Boys	1986	Polydor	LP (#829 538-1), MC (#829 538-4)	Produced by Vic Maile. MC had three additional live songs, "Suzie McKenna", "Shake it on the Rocks" and "Venus," recorded at Pinkpop Festival 1986.
Crack My Nut	1987	Polydor	LP (#833 436-1), CD (#833 436-2)	CD with two extra songs: "Monoman" and "The Clapman."
Hitkillers	1988	Megadisc	LP (MD 7894)	Covers of Dutch hits, with guest musicians Hans Dulfer, Tineke Schoenmaker, Herman Brood, Jaap van Beusekom, Cor Witjes, John Legrand, A.L. Jones.
Angelbite	1990	Solid	LP (#527.9001.10), CD (#527.9001.20)	
$uga(r)	1992	EMI	CD (#0777 7809162 2)	Reissued on CD in February 2008 by EMI, with two extra tracks.
Nipple	1994	EMI	CD (#7243 8 31127 2 2)	Reissued on CD in February 2008 by EMI, with three extra tracks.
Will-O-The-Wisp	3 March 1997	EMI	CD (#7243 8 59950 2 6)	Reissued on CD in February 2008 by EMI, with six extra tracks.
Pajama Day	4 February 2008	PIAS	CD (#481.1700.022)	
Hammer	2013	PIAS	CD (#944.A106.220)	
It's Not Me, The Horse Is Not Me - Part 1	23 February 2018	CD (Butler Records), LP (Music On Vinyl)	CD (#BUR340036), LP (#MOVLP2081)	
Kite	1 October 2021	Excelsior Recordings	LP (#EXCEL96645), CD (#EXCEL96646)	The (double) LP version contains an extra track "The Horse Part 2 - Re: Red Letter, You're On Your Own"
Fly	12 September 2025	Excelsior Recordings	LP (#EXCEL96852), CD (EXCEL96853)	

== Compilation albums ==
Title	Released	Label(s)	Format(s)	Notes
Claw Boys Claw 3 in 1	1987	Polydor	LP (#833 049-1)	Compilation of Now!, "So Mean," and Indian Wallpaper.
Hitkillers/The Beast Of Claw Boys Claw	1988	Megadisc	CD (#MDC 7894)	Hitkillers with additional songs (except one track, all are rerecorded versions of previously released Claw Boys Claw tracks)

== Singles ==
Single	Released	Label	Format(s)	Song(s) and notes
"So Mean"	1985	Hipcat	7" (#HIP 2345)	"So Mean" b/w "Love Like Seas."
"Indian Wallpaper"	1985	Hipcat	7" (#HIP 6789)	"Indian Wallpaper" b/w "Dirty Dog."
Indian Wallpaper	1985	Hipcat	12" (#HIP 6789)	"Dirty Dog" and "Foul Play" b/w "Indian Wallpaper"
"Locomotive Breath"	1986	Polydor	7" (#885 187-7)	"Locomotive Breath" b/w "Suzie McKenna". The last track was recorded live at Pinkpop 1986.
"Locomotive Breath"	1986	Polydor	12" (#885 187-1)	"Locomotive Breath" and "Suzie McKenna" b/w "Shake It On The Rocks" and "Venus". The last three tracks were recorded live at Pinkpop 1986.
"Blue Bells"	1986	Polydor	7" (#885 521-7)	"Blue Bells" b/w "Jingle Bells". Christmas single. Rereleased by Polydor in 1987 (#887 294-7).
"Teenage Heartattack"	1987	Polydor	7" (#885 994-7)	"Teenage Heartattack" b/w "The Clapman"
"Gimme A Break"	1988	Polydor	7" (#887 392-7)	"Gimme A Break" b/w Monoman"
"Dracula/The Rose"	1989	Megadisc	7" (#MD 5270)	"Dracula" b/w "The Rose"
"Dracula/The Rose"	1989	Megadisc	CD single (#MDC 5270)	Includes "Dracula" and "The Rose" plus bonus live concert by The Hipcats: "Down in the Boondocks", "Groupy Girl", "Angel Of The Morning", "Born To Wander", "Come Together", "Return Of The Phantom Shark", "Sunset 'B", "I'm Eighteen" and "Oh Pretty Woman". Bonus live concert by The Hipcats (= Claw Boys Claw), recorded opening for Nick Cave & The Bad Seeds at Vredenburg, Utrecht, October 6, 1986 (incorrectly on sleeve as June 10, 1986).
"Maniac"	1990	Solid	7" (#527.9002.40)	"Maniac" b/w "Clapping Song"
"Bite The Dice"	1990	Solid	CD single (#527.9003.22)	Includes acoustic set, recorded and mixed at SPN Studios, Amsterdam, October 1990: "Hungerlove", "Bite The Dice, Maniac", "Spoons On Fire" and "Locomotive Breath"
"Rosie"	1992	EMI	7" (#7243 8 72009 7 5), CD single (#7243 8 72009 2 0)	"Rosie" b/w "Rosie (Lambless)". The first top-40 hit for the band in the Netherlands.
"Spread that Jam"	1993	EMI	7" (#872 017-7), CD single (#7243 8 72017 2 9)	"Spread that Jam (remix)" b/w "The Keeper"
"Jackal Is Back"	1993	EMI	CD single (#7243 8 72024 2 9)	"Jackal Is Back" and "Yoy (Lambless)"
"Call Me An Angel"	1994	EMI	CD single (#7243 8 72060 2 1)	"Call Me An Angel" and "Part One"
"Call Me An Angel"	1994	EMI	CD single (#7243 8 72064 2 7)	"Call Me An Angel", "Get You Off (brrr mix)", "Sound Isn't Real (previously unreleased)" and "Sugarlite Blonde (Pinkpop '93)"
"Walk Away"	1995	EMI	CD single (#7243 8 72077 2 1)	Promotional only single, includes "Walk Away", "Part One" and "Get You Off (brrr mix)"
"Sick In The Head"	1995	EMI	CD single (#7243 8 72077 2 1)	Includes acoustic set recorded for Veronica's Countdown Café: "Paris", "Walk Away" and "Call Me An Angel."
"Why Don't You Grow"	1997	EMI	CD single (#7243 8 844002 8)	"Why Don't You Grow" and "Will-O-The-Wisp (In My Garden)"
"Kiss Kiss"	1997	EMI	CD single (#7243 8 848952 2)	"Kiss Kiss" and "Horsefly (recorded in space) (droopy-tune version)"
"I Am Sea"	2008	PIAS	CDR single	One-track promotional single for radio stations only.
