= Sugar (Claw Boys Claw album) =

Suga(r)

Studio album by Claw Boys Claw
- Released: 1992
- Recorded: Recorded and mixed at Orkater Studios, Amsterdam, August 1992
- Genre: Rock
- Label: EMI
- Producer: Michel Schoots

Claw Boys Claw chronology
Angelbite (1990)	Suga(r) (1992)	Nipple (1994)

Singles from Suga(r)
- 1. "Rosie" Released: 1992; 2. "Spread That Jam" Released: 1993; 3. "Jackal Is Back" Released: 1993

Suga(r), originally stylized as '$ugǝ[r]', is the sixth studio album by Dutch rock band Claw Boys Claw. It's their first album on EMI productions. Musically it sees the former garage band move toward what would be called "swamp rock".

It is the most successful album of their career, reaching no. 26 on 13 February 1993 on the Dutch album chart, staying on the chart for ten weeks. Of the three singles that came from the album, the first one, "Rosie", charted - the first time for a Claw Boys Claw single - and reached no. 22 on 30 January 1993. The CD was reissued in 2008, with two extra tracks; "Spread That Jam (remix)" and "The Keeper" which had earlier been released as a CD single.

== Track listing ==
All tracks are written by Te Bos/Cameron/Groot/Lamb.

No.	Title	Length
1.	"Hail On"	4:20
2.	"Rosie"	4:24
3.	"Jackal Is Back"	3:40
4.	"Sound of the Psycho"	3:37
5.	"Monkeyride"	3:57
6.	"Spread That Jam"	3:55
7.	"Edit Away"	2:30
8.	"Use It"	2:03
9.	"Hide"	3:56
10.	"Sugarlite Blonde"	3:34
11.	"Y.O.Y"	3:10
12.	"Take Me for a Ride"	7:17
13.	"Rosie (Lambless)"	4:36
14.	"Spread That Jam (remix)"	3:43
15.	"The Keeper"	3:46

== Personnel ==
- John Cameron – guitar
- Pete TeBos – vocals
- Geert de Groot – bass, backing vocals
- Marc Lamb – drums
- Marcel Schoots – percussion, production
- Frank van der Weij – mix, engineering

== See also ==
- Claw Boys Claw discography
