= With Love from the Boys =

With Love From The Boys

Studio album by Claw Boys Claw
- Released: 1986
- Genre: Rock and roll
- Label: Polydor
- Producer: Vic Maile

Claw Boys Claw chronology
Shocking Shades of Claw Boys Claw (1984)	With Love From The Boys (1986)	Claw Boys Claw 3 in 1 (1987)

Singles from With Love From The Boys
- 1. "Locomotive Breath" Released: 1986

With Love From The Boys is the second studio album by Dutch rock and roll band Claw Boys Claw and their first release on a major label.

== History ==
The band's debut album, Shocking Shades of Claw Boys Claw, self-released on Hipcat, had been well received in the Dutch press, and in 1984 and 1985 they cemented their reputation as one of the country's best live acts, which was partly documented on a live EP, Live!, recorded in 1984 and released in 1985 also on Hipcat. Their live reputation culminated in a memorable show at Pinkpop 1986, and these successes led Polydor to offer the band a long-term contract. The band had undergone one personnel change: founding member Allard Jolles left to focus on his other band, L'Attentat; he was replaced by Marius Schrader.

With Love From The Boys was produced by Vic Maile; critics did note that the album sounded a bit flat, and the compositions were also criticized as somewhat weak. Released on vinyl, the album has never been re-released.

== Track listing ==
No.	Title	Length
1.	"On The Run" (Te Bos/Cameron/Rossini/Schrader)	3:48
2.	"Mad Magician" (Te Bos/Cameron/Rossini/Schrader)	2:32
3.	"Skindeep" (Te Bos/Cameron/Rossini/Schrader)	3:33
4.	"That's Life" (Te Bos/Cameron/Rossini/Schrader)	2:38
5.	"Suzie McKenna" (Te Bos/Cameron/Rossini/Schrader)	3:36
6.	"Dig It" (Te Bos/Cameron/Rossini/Schrader)	3:04
7.	"Locomotive Breath" (Ian Anderson)	3:31
8.	"Jealous Eyes" (Te Bos/Cameron/Rossini/Schrader)	3:22
9.	"Last Farewell" (Te Bos/Cameron/Rossini/Schrader)	3:45
10.	"Ridin' The Blinds" (Te Bos/Cameron/Rossini/Schrader)	2:06
11.	"Too Far" (Te Bos/Cameron/Rossini/Schrader)	2:58
12.	"El Jerko" (Te Bos/Cameron/Rossini/Schrader)	1:35

- The compact cassette featured three extra tracks, recorded at Pinkpop 1986: "Suzie McKenna," "Shake It On The Rocks," and "Venus."

== Personnel ==
- John Cameron - guitar
- Pete TeBos - vocals
- Bobbie Rossini - bass
- Marius Schrader - drums

== See also ==
- Claw Boys Claw discography
