= Dacre Stoker =

Canadian author

- Born: Dacre Calder Stoker; August 23, 1958 (age 68); Montreal, Quebec, Canada
- Education: St. Lawrence University
- Occupations: Writer; teacher; modern pentathlete; coach
- Spouse: Jenness Stoker
- Relatives: Charlotte Stoker (great-great-grandmother); Thornley Stoker (great-uncle); Bram Stoker (great-uncle)
- Website: dacrestoker.com

Dacre Calder Stoker (born August 23, 1958) is a Canadian-American writer, teacher and former modern pentathlete and coach based in Aiken, South Carolina.

== Early life and education ==
Dacre Calder Stoker was born on August 23, 1958 in Montreal, Quebec to Desmond Neil Stoker (1927–1983) and Eleanor Gail Stoker (née Calder; 1933–2018). Stoker's mother was a nurse. Stoker has two sisters.

Through his father Stoker is the great-grandson of the military surgeon George Stoker (1854–1920), and is the great-grandnephew of Bram Stoker and great-great-grandson of Charlotte Stoker.

Stoker was educated at Bishop's College School before studying physical education at St. Lawrence University.

== Career ==
Stoker is a former member of the Canadian men's pentathlon team, and was the coach for the 1988 Olympic Canadian pentathlon team. Stoker was a teacher at Appleby College and Aiken Preparatory School.

In 2009, Stoker co-wrote his debut novel Dracula the Un-dead with Ian Holt, based on Dracula. In 2012, Stoker and Professor Elizabeth Miller published The Lost Journal of Bram Stoker: The Dublin Years which details sections of a journal written by Bram Stoker between 1871–1882.

Together with Bram Stoker's great-grandson Robin Guy MacCaw, Stoker and his wife Jennes Stroker are the co-owners of Bram Stoker LLC, which represents the descendants of Bram Stoker in the UK and controls the international rights and trademarks of the Bram Stoker Estate.

== Personal life ==
Stoker is married to Jenness Stoker (née Fick; born 1954).

== Bibliography ==
- Stoker, Dacre; Holt, Ian (2009). Dracula the Un-dead. London: HarperCollins. ISBN 9780007310340.
- Stoker, Dacre (2010). "Foreward". In Browning, John Edgar; Picart, Caroline Joan (Kay) (eds.). Dracula in Visual Media: Film, Television, Comic Book and Electronic Game Appearances, 1921-2010. Jefferson, North Carolina: McFarland & Co. pp. 1–2. ISBN 978-0786433650.
- Miller, Elizabeth; Stoker, Dacre, eds. (2012). The Lost Journal of Bram Stoker: The Dublin Years. London: Robson Press. ISBN 9781849541886.
- Stoker, Darce; Barker, J.D. (2018). Dracul. New York, New York: Bantam Books. ISBN 9780735219342.
- Shepherd, Mike; Stoker, Dacre (2021). Slains Castle's Secret History: Warlords, Churchill, and Count Dracula (1 ed.). Amazon Digital Services. ISBN 979-8469387046.
- Stoker, Bram (2022). Stoker, Dacre; Eighteen-Bisang, Robert (eds.). Dracula Annotated for the 125th Anniversary. Hellbound Books. ISBN 978-1953905376.

=== StokerVerse ===
- Stoker, Darce; McAuley, Chris (2021). The Virgin's Embrace: A thrilling adaptation of a story originally written by Bram Stoker. StokerVerse. Vol. 1. Stoker McAuley Productions. ISBN 978-1789825497.
- Stoker, Darce; McAuley, Chris; Peel, John (2021). Dracula's Bedlam. StokerVerse. Vol. 2. Stoker McAuley Productions. ISBN 978-1789828528.
- Stoker, Darce; McAuley, Chris (2022). Chebsey, Shane (ed.). Dracula - The Return: Book One - The Cult of the White Worm. Scratch Comics.

=== Audio Dramas ===
- Stoker, Darce; McAuley, Chris (2021), Voices of Dracula - Series 1: 10 Short StokerVerse Stories, Andrews UK

== Filmography ==
Year	Title	Type	Director	Writer	Notes	Ref(s)
2021	In Search of Bram Stoker's Castle: Dracula's Castle	Documentary film	Corneliu Țepeluş	Dacre Stoker	Also narrator	
