= Dirt Dog (disambiguation) =

Dirt Dog may refer to:

- Trot Nixon, a baseball player nicknamed "The Dirt Dog"
- Dirt Dog (rapper), one of several pseudonyms for Ol' Dirty Bastard
- iRobot Dirt Dog, a cleaning robot
- Dirt Dog, Heavy duty equipment

== See also ==
- Dirty Dog (disambiguation)
