= Claw Boys Claw 3 in 1 =

Compilation album by Claw Boys Claw
- Released: 1987
- Recorded: 1984–1985
- Genre: Rock and roll
- Label: Polydor 833 049-1

Claw Boys Claw chronology
With Love From The Boys (1986)	Claw Boys Claw 3 in 1 (1987)	Crack My Nut (1987)

Claw Boys Claw 3 in 1 (also known as Claw Boys Claw or as 3 in 1) is a compilation album by the Dutch rock and roll band Claw Boys Claw. The album, released on LP by Polydor, combined songs from the Indian Wallpaper 12-inch single (1985), the "So Mean" single (1985), and the 12-inch single Now! (1984).

== Track listing ==
No.	Title	Length
1.	"Indian Wallpaper" (Te Bos/Cameron/Rossini/Schrader)
2.	"Love Like Seas" (Te Bos/Cameron/Rossini/Schrader)
3.	"So Mean" (Te Bos/Cameron/Rossini/Schrader)
4.	"Foul Play" (Te Bos/Cameron/Rossini/Schrader)
5.	"Dirty Dog" (Te Bos/Cameron/Rossini/Schrader)
6.	"Cosmic Blue" (Te Bos/Cameron/Rossini/Schrader)
7.	"Feelin' Fine" (Te Bos/Cameron/Rossini/Schrader)
8.	"Nightmare" (Te Bos/Cameron/Rossini/Schrader)
9.	"Do the Skull" (Te Bos/Cameron/Rossini/Schrader)
10.	"So Mean" (Te Bos/Cameron/Rossini/Schrader)
11.	"The Fall" (Te Bos/Cameron/Rossini/Schrader)

- Tracks 1, 4, and 5 from Indian Wallpaper; tracks 2 and 3 from "So Mean"; tracks 6–11 recorded live in the Melkweg, Amsterdam, November 29, 1984.

== Personnel ==
- John Cameron - guitar
- Pete TeBos - vocals
- Bobbie Rossini - bass
- Marius Schrader - drums

== See also ==
- Claw Boys Claw discography
