= Bram Stoker's Dracula =

Bram Stoker's Dracula may refer to:

- Dracula, an 1897 English-language novel by Irish author Bram Stoker
  - Dracula's Guest and Other Weird Stories, a 1914 collection of short stories by Bram Stoker
  - Bram Stoker's Dracula (1974 film), a 1974 television film by Dan Curtis
  - Bram Stoker's Dracula (1992 film), a 1992 American gothic horror film
    - Bram Stoker's Dracula (soundtrack), for the 1992 film
    - Bram Stoker's Dracula (video game), 1992 video game adaptation of the 1992 film
    - Bram Stoker's Dracula (handheld video game), 1992 game for the Game Boy
    - Bram Stoker's Dracula (pinball), a 1993 pinball machine based on the 1992 film
    - Bram Stoker's Dracula, a four-issue Topps comic book adaptation of the 1992 film, by Mike Mignola
