= Angelbite =

Studio album by Claw Boys Claw
- Released: 1990
- Genre: Rock and roll
- Label: Solid
- Producer: Steve Parker

Claw Boys Claw chronology
Hitkillers/The Beast Of Claw Boys Claw (1988)	Angelbite (1990)	Sugar (Claw Boys Claw album) (1992)

Singles from Angelbite
- 1. "Maniac" Released: 1990; 2. "Bite The Dice" Released: 1990

Angelbite is the fifth studio album by Dutch rock and roll band Claw Boys Claw. The album comes at a transitional time; the band had been let go by Polydor and the two albums released on Megadisc had not been very successful. This is their sole release on the small label Solid. The band changed personnel also: early members Bobbie Rossini (bass) and Marius Schrader (drums) had left the band at the end of 1988, and were replaced by Arno Kooy and Marc Lamb, respectively. This was Kooy's sole recording with Claw Boys Claw; Lamb is still with the band.

Angelbite, musically, points to the later "swamp rock" sound the band would adopt. The album was not a great commercial success; it never charted, nor did any of the two singles from it.

John Cale was to have produced the album; he had met the band while they were in the United States at the New Music Seminar, summer 1988. In the end, Angelbite was produced by Steve Parker, who had earlier produced The Fall and Mathilde Santing.

== Track listing ==
No.	Title	Length
1.	"Super Kid" (Claw Boys Claw)
2.	"Maniac" (Claw Boys Claw)
3.	"Troglodyte" (Jimmy Castor)
4.	"Ellah" (Claw Boys Claw)
5.	"Devol" (Claw Boys Claw)
6.	"Roll On" (Claw Boys Claw)
7.	"Wild Voo Doo" (Claw Boys Claw)
8.	"Bite The Dice" (Claw Boys Claw)
9.	"Down in the Bubble" (Claw Boys Claw)
10.	"Hunger Love" (Claw Boys Claw)
11.	"Maximum Overdrive" (Claw Boys Claw)
12.	"So Hot" (Claw Boys Claw)
13.	"Spoons On Fire" (Claw Boys Claw)
14.	"Judy" (Claw Boys Claw)

== Credits ==
- John Cameron – guitar
- Pete TeBos – vocals
- Arno Kooy – bass
- Marc Lamb – drums
- Steve Parker – producer

== See also ==
- Claw Boys Claw discography
