= Nipple (album) =

Studio album by Claw Boys Claw
- Released: 1994
- Genre: Rock and roll
- Label: EMI
- Producer: Luc Suèr

Claw Boys Claw chronology
$uga(r) (1992)	Nipple (1994)	Will-O-The-Wisp (1997)

Singles from Nipple
- 1. "Call Me An Angel" Released: 1994; 2. "Walk Away" Released: 1994; 3. "Sick in the Head" Released: 1995

Nipple is the seventh studio album by Dutch rock and roll band Claw Boys Claw. Coming on the heels of the commercially successful $uga(r), Nipple continues musically where the previous album left off, in the area of "swamp rock." The album was not a great commercial success, reaching No. 71 on 10 December 1994 on the Dutch album chart; the three singles that came from the album did not chart.

The CD was reissued in 2008, with three extra tracks, all of which had previously been released on the CD single "Call Me An Angel." "Get You Off (Brrr Mix)" is a remix, and "Sound Isn't Real" and "Sugarlite Blonde" were recorded at Pinkpop 1993.

== Track listing ==
No.	Title	Length
1.	"Pretty" (Te Bos/Cameron/Groot/Lamb)	2:02
2.	"Walk Away" (Te Bos/Cameron/Groot/Lamb)	5:06
3.	"How Do You Know (What I Feel)" (Te Bos/Cameron/Groot/Lamb)	3:56
4.	"Sick in the Head" (Te Bos/Cameron/Groot/Lamb)	4:31
5.	"Get You Off" (Te Bos/Cameron/Groot/Lamb)	3:34
6.	"Bones" (Te Bos/Cameron/Groot/Lamb)	5:33
7.	"Paris" (Te Bos/Cameron/Groot/Lamb)	4:38
8.	"Scope" (Te Bos/Cameron/Groot/Lamb)	4:30
9.	"Part One" (Te Bos/Cameron/Groot/Lamb)	0:39
10.	"Call Me An Angel" (Te Bos/Cameron/Groot/Lamb)	3:32
11.	"Limbo" (Te Bos/Cameron/Groot/Lamb)	4:48
12.	"Under Water" (Te Bos/Cameron/Groot/Lamb)	6:03
13.	"Shader" (Te Bos/Cameron/Groot/Lamb)	4:40
14.	"Dee De Lee Dee" (Te Bos/Cameron/Groot/Lamb)	4:09
15.	"Get You Off (Brrr Remix)" (Te Bos/Cameron/Groot/Lamb)	3:35
16.	"Sound Isn't Real" (Te Bos/Cameron/Groot/Lamb)	6:17
17.	"Sugarlite Blonde" (Te Bos/Cameron/Groot/Lamb)	4:13

== Personnel ==
- John Cameron – guitar
- Pete TeBos – vocals
- Geert de Groot – bass, flute, backing vocals
- Marc Lamb – drums, percussion
- Luc Suèr – engineer, producer

== Recording ==
- Tracks 1–15 recorded at Luc Suèr's studio, Amsterdam, 1994; mixed at Orkater Studios, Amsterdam
- Tracks 16 and 17 recorded live, Pinkpop 1993

== See also ==
- Claw Boys Claw discography
