= Alucard =

Alucard (the anadrome of "Dracula") may refer to:

== Characters ==
- Mr. Alucard, Dracula’s alias in the 1987 film The Monster Squad
- Alucard (Castlevania), a character in the video game series Castlevania
- Alucard (Hellsing), the main character of the manga series Hellsing
- Count Alucard (character), the title character of the 1943 film Son of Dracula
- Rachel Alucard, a player character in the video game series BlazBlue
- Alucard, a character in the film Dr. Terror's Gallery of Horrors
- Alucard, a character in the manga series Rosario + Vampire
- Alucard, a character in the novel series The Lost Books
- Alucard, a player character in the video game Mobile Legends: Bang Bang
- Alucard van Heusen, a character in the television series Wizards of Waverly Place
- Alexander "A." Lucard, a character in the television series Dracula: The Series
- Dr. Alucard, a character in the film The Batman vs. Dracula
- Johnny Alucard, a character in the film Dracula A.D. 1972
- Johnny Alucard, a character in the novel series Anno Dracula
- Alucard, a character in the game Pico's School

== Music ==
- Alucard Music, a British record label
- "Alucard", a song from the 1970 album Gentle Giant by Gentle Giant
- "Alucard", a song from the 2010 EP Seepage by Tech N9ne
- "Sevil Alucard", a song from the 1994 album The Dark Chapter by Michael Romeo

== Other uses ==
- Alucard, a kernel variant and hotplug driver for Android devices

== See also ==
- Dracula (disambiguation)
