= Solarized =

Color scheme for computer software

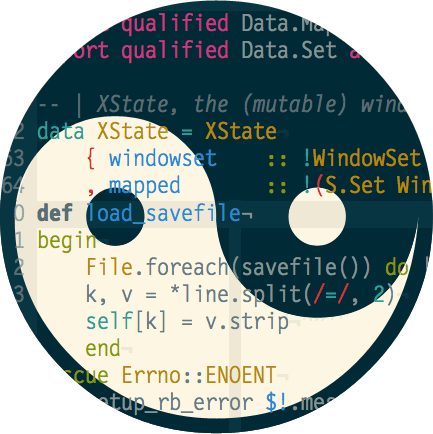
- A yin-yang symbol showcasing both the light and dark schemes
- Original author: Ethan Schoonover
- Preview release: 1.0.0beta2 / April 16, 2011; 14 years ago
- Written in: XML, Vim script, HTML, Perl
- License: MIT License
- Website: ethanschoonover.com/solarized/
- Repository: github.com/altercation/solarized

Solarized is a color scheme for code editors and terminal emulators created by Ethan Schoonover. The scheme is available in a light and a dark mode. Packages that implement the color scheme have been published for many major applications, with some including the scheme pre-installed.

== History ==
Ethan Schoonover—a designer and software developer—began working on Solarized in 2010 after he installed a new code editor and could not find a color scheme he liked. He found the default white-on-black schemes of most applications to be too high in contrast. Even for low-contrast schemes, some colors were more prominent than others. This was an issue for programming, as code editors use syntax highlighting, where color is used to indicate the different parts of the code.

Initially, Schoonover attempted to modify the colors of another scheme called Zenburn, but he was daunted by its implementation in Vim script and did not agree with some of its design decisions. Schoonover took six months in order to research and create Solarized, with the goal of applying "design rigor". Schoonover published Solarized in April 2011 on GitHub.

Schoonover has refused offers of donations to the project, preferring to not be beholden to others regarding changes, especially since aspects of programming environments such as color schemes can be contentious. Schoonover had considered releasing a revised set of color schemes as "Solarized 2" in order to avoid legacy support issues based on the original Solarized.

== Design ==
Schoonover used Vim as his editor inside of a terminal, so he had to be conscious of its color limitations and decided to limit the scheme to 16 colors. He also worked on both a light and dark color scheme early on, with the goal of making them opposites of each other and cohesive. Due to Schoonover's prior experience with photography and color management, Solarized was designed in the CIELAB color space, with sRGB hex values being generated from canonical CIELAB values. Initially, Schoonover had a goal of creating a build system that would output themes for many different applications, but it proved difficult due to undocumented and complicated formats.

Solarized reduces brightness contrast but, unlike many low contrast colorschemes, retains contrasting hues (based on colorwheel relations) for syntax highlighting readability.

– Ethan Schoonover

Schoonover first worked on Ruby and Haskell syntax highlighting to make sure their overall "typographic color" looked consistent. Schoonover had trouble getting the shade of red correct. The use of the colors yellow and blue were personal choices for Schoonover: yellow associated with "pleasant sounds, shapes, and pieces of music" due to minor synesthesia, and blue representing how he imagined drowning in the ocean to be like because of his thalassophobia. Schoonover expressed concern that ports might use an uneven mix of colors or too many colors. The light and dark schemes have symmetric CIELAB lightness differences in their base colors, preserving perceived contrast. The 16-color palette was also designed to scale down to multiple five-color palettes for design work.

=== Colors ===
Solarized 1.0.0beta2 (Note: The first release of Solarized—1.0.0beta1—had a Red with a L* value of 45 ( ).) color palette
Color		CIELAB D_{65}			sRGB				xterm	Terminal	Usage
Name	Swatch	L*	a*	b*	Hex	R	G	B	Code	Name	Usage
Base03		15	−12	−12	#002b36	0	43	54	234	brblack	background tones (dark theme)
Base02		20	−12	−12	#073642	7	54	66	235	black	background tones (dark theme)
Base01		45	−07	−07	#586e75	88	110	117	240	brgreen	content tones
Base00		50	−07	−07	#657b83	101	123	131	241	bryellow	content tones
Base0		60	−06	−03	#839496	131	148	150	244	brblue	content tones
Base1		65	−05	−02	#93a1a1	147	161	161	245	brcyan	content tones
Base2		92	−00	10	#eee8d5	238	232	213	254	white	background tones (light theme)
Base3		97	00	10	#fdf6e3	253	246	227	230	brwhite	background tones (light theme)
Yellow		60	10	65	#b58900	181	137	0	136	yellow	accent tones
Orange		50	50	55	#cb4b16	203	75	22	166	brred	accent tones
Red		50	65	45	#dc322f	220	50	47	160	red	accent tones
Magenta		50	65	−05	#d33682	211	54	130	125	magenta	accent tones
Violet		50	15	−45	#6c71c4	108	113	196	61	brmagenta	accent tones
Blue		55	−10	−45	#268bd2	38	139	210	33	blue	accent tones
Cyan		60	−35	−05	#2aa198	42	161	152	37	cyan	accent tones
Green		60	−20	65	#859900	133	153	0	64	green	accent tones

== Redesigns ==
Selenized, an alternate revision of the Solarized palette made by Jan Warchol, is intended to improve readability and better distinguish close shades (like green–yellow and blue–violet). OKSolar, by Zack Voase, is intended to provide more uniform perceptual brightness by using colors defined in the OKLab color space instead of CIELAB.

== Reception ==
Upon release on GitHub, Solarized reached the top percentiles of projects for that week. Joel Falconer of The Next Web recommended Solarized, writing: "I doubt there are many, if any, terminal color schemes that have received the amount of thought and attention that Schoonover's Solarized has." Writing for Tidbits, Steven Aquino tested Solarized Light along with the Cousine font and reported that "as a visually impaired person, I find the combination to be extremely comfortable for my eyes. ... I'm experiencing considerably less eye strain than normal."

== Gallery ==
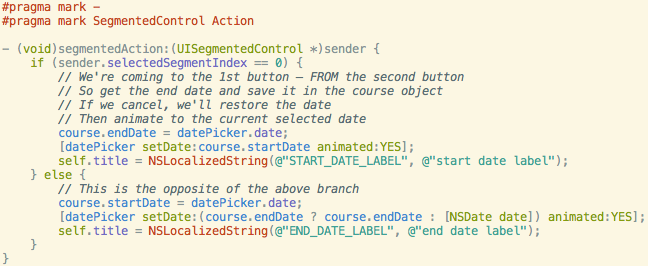
A port of Solarized Light being used in the syntax highlighting of Objective-C source code

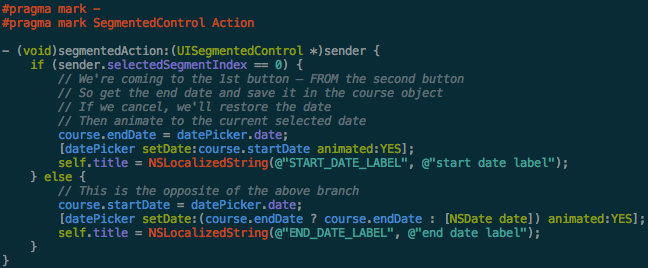
The same source code using Solarized Dark

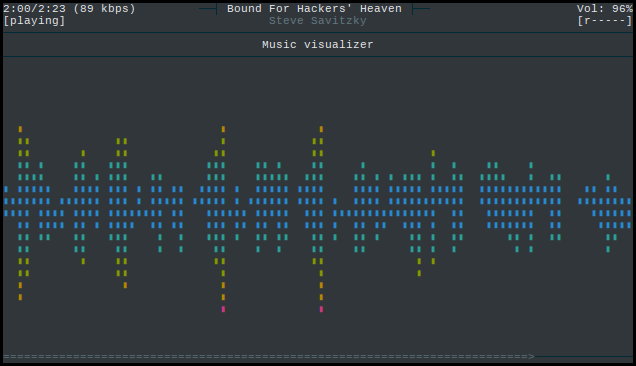
Solarized Dark used to style ncmpcpp, an MPD client running in the terminal

Solarized Light used in a diagram showing the process used to write the Wikimedia Foundation's weekly technology newsletter

Solarized Dark used in a geographically accurate Paris Métro map

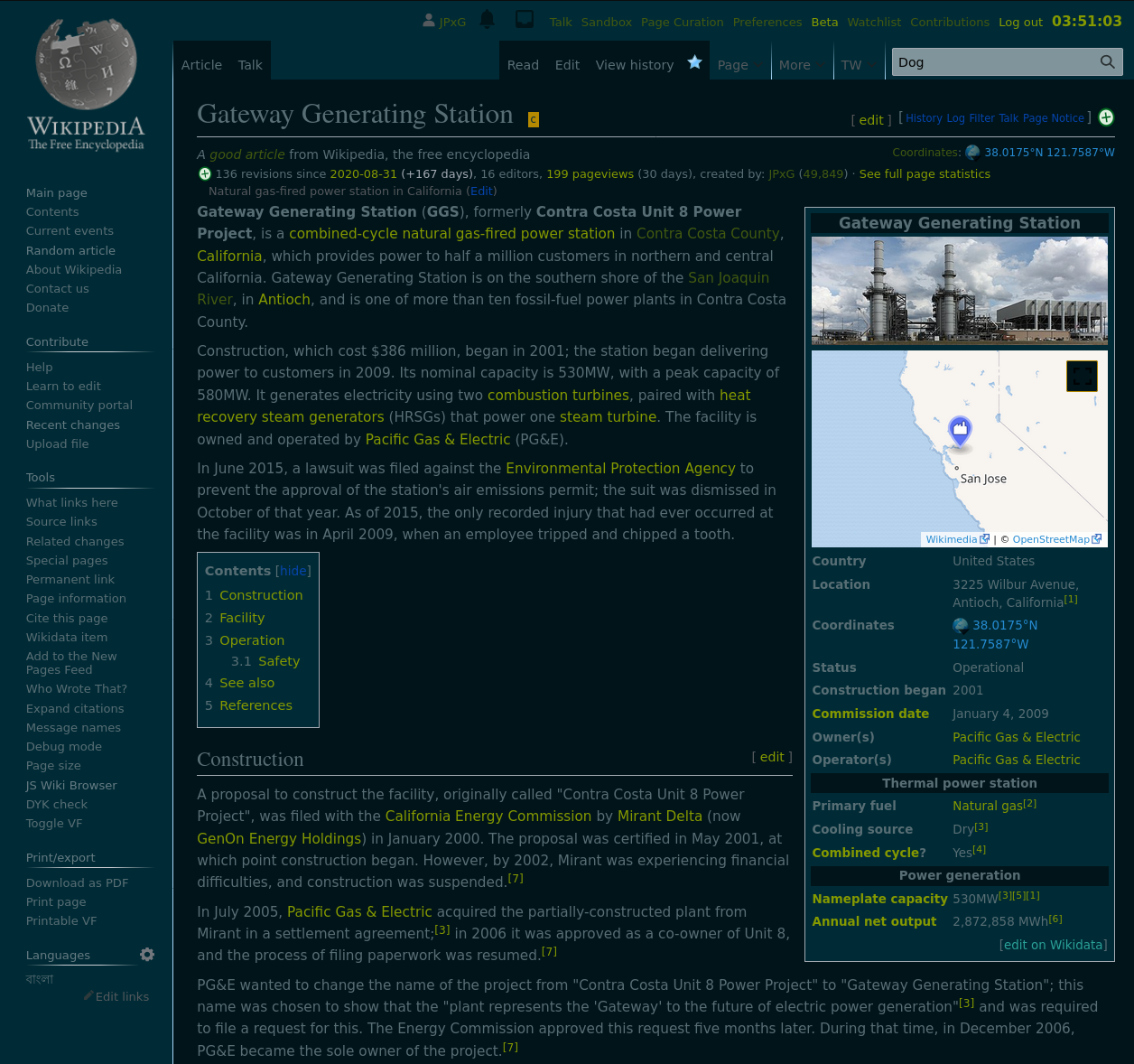
A slightly modified version of Solarized Dark in a custom Wikipedia skin

== See also ==
- Helmholtz–Kohlrausch effect – perceptual phenomenon
- Dracula (color scheme)
