= Dracula/The Rose =

Single by Claw Boys Claw

from the album Hitkillers
- B-side: "The Rose"
- Released: 1989
- Recorded: 1988
- Genre: Rock and roll
- Label: Megadisc
- Songwriter: B. Bouber
- Producer: Allard Jolles/Claw Boys Claw

"Dracula"/"The Rose" is a 7" single (Megadisc MD 5270) by Dutch rock and roll band Claw Boys Claw. "Dracula" had earlier been released on the Hitkillers album, a collection of covers of Dutch hits from the 1960s and 1970s. The B-side, "The Rose," was recorded in 1988 but never released. On March 25, 1989, "Dracula" reached No. 85 on the Dutch charts, where it spent a total of 4 weeks.

The two songs were also issued as a CD single (Megadisc MDC 5270) with a number of bonus tracks. These nine songs, most of which covers, were recorded on October 6, 1986 (on sleeve incorrectly listed as June 10, 1986), when the Claw Boys Claw, operating under the name "The Hipcats," opened for Nick Cave & The Bad Seeds in Vredenburg, Utrecht.

== Track listing ==
No.	Title	Length
1.	"Dracula" (B. Bouber)	3:16
2.	"The Rose" (P. Te Bos/B. Rossini/J. Cameron/M. Schrader)	2:22

== Credits ==
- John Cameron – guitar
- Pete TeBos – vocals
- Bobbio Rossini – bass
- Marius Schrader – drums
- Allard Jolles – producer (tracks 1 and 2)
- Frank van der Weij – engineer (track 1)
- Michiel Jansen – engineer (track 2)

== Recording ==
- Track 1 recorded at Orkater Studios, Amsterdam, 1988; mixed at Zeezicht Studios
- Track 2 recorded and mixed at SPN Studios, Amsterdam, 1988

== See also ==
- Claw Boys Claw discography
