= A Blackbird in Silver =

1986 novel

A Blackbird in Silver is a novel by Freda Warrington published in 1986.

== Plot summary ==
A Blackbird in Silver is a novel in which adventurers undertake a quest to defeat an evil creature.

== Reception ==
Dave Langford reviewed A Blackbird in Silver for White Dwarf #75, and stated that "The writing spins out a huge ever-increasing trilogy. Beam me up, Scotty."

== Reviews ==
- Review by Pauline Morgan (1986) in Fantasy Review, May 1986
- Review by Nik Morton (1986) in Paperback Inferno, #60
- Review by L. J. Hurst (1992) in Paperback Inferno, #96
