= Dracul (novel) =

2018 novel by Dacre Stoker and J.D. Barker

- First edition cover
- Author: Dacre Stoker, J. D. Barker
- Language: English
- Genre: Horror novel
- Publisher: G. P. Putnam's Sons
- Publication date: October 2, 2018
- Publication place: United States
- Media type: Print; Digital
- Pages: 512 pp
- ISBN: 9780735219342
- Dewey Decimal: 813/.6
- LC Class: PS3619.T645 D7 2019

Dracul is a 2018 horror novel and a prequel novel to Bram Stoker's classic 1897 work Dracula. The book was written by Bram Stoker's great-grandnephew Dacre Stoker and American author J. D. Barker. It is Stoker's second novel, after his 2009 Dracula sequel, Dracula the Un-dead, co-written with Ian Holt.

In its preparation, Stoker and Barker referenced Bram Stoker's notes for Dracula, its manuscript, its Icelandic variant Makt Myrkranna, and the short story Dracula's Guest, while Stoker also visited the locations mentioned in the books and in Bram Stoker's diary. Dracul makes use of the unpublished first 100 pages of Dracula's manuscript. Primarily set in 1868, the novel places a 21-year-old Bram Stoker as its central character, as he journals the sequence of events that led him to facing off with The Count, including Stoker's childhood; Dacre Stoker had previously featured Bram Stoker as a character in Dracula the Un-dead.

== Synopsis ==
From within Whitby Abbey, Bram writes in his diary about his childhood days, largely spent bedridden in Dublin, with his siblings, Matilda and Thornley, and nanny, Ellen Crone. The Stoker children become suspicious of Ellen following a series of deaths in nearby towns.

After Bram is miraculously healed from his ailments, she suddenly disappears into a bog without a trace. Matilda later departs for Paris to study, and returns after some years to report that she has once again seen Ellen, albeit unaged. They set off to investigate Ellen, eventually revealing her connection to Dracula.

== Reception ==
Kirkus Reviews wrote that it "will no doubt be a hit among monster-movie and horror lit fans—and for good reason", noting that it is "a lively if unlovely story, in which the once febrile Bram becomes a sort of Indiana Jones".

For the Financial Times, Zoë Apostolides writes that the "interpretation of the Stokers' lives represents a thrilling new exploration of the novel's creation and its creator", and that "this addition to the canon is a brilliantly entertaining read".

Angie Barry, writing a mixed review for Criminal Element, says "Dracul doesn’t tread much new ground. But its biographical framing and focus on Ellen Crone makes it a compelling, entertaining read nonetheless".

== Film ==
In September 2017, prior to Dracul's publication, Paramount Pictures purchased the movie rights to the book. Director Andy Muschietti and It producers Barbara Muschietti and Roy Lee were announced to be attached to the film.
