= Dr. Acula =

Dr. Acula is a variation of the name Dracula.

Dr. Acula may also refer to:

- Pseudonym of Forrest J Ackerman (1916–2008), American science fiction fan and collector
- Dr. Acula (band), deathcore band from Long Island, New York
- Dr. Acula, fictional film by the Scrubs character J.D.
- Dr. Acula, film proposed by Ed Wood, as depicted in Ed Wood (film)
- Dr. Acula, in the Ed Wood film Night of the Ghouls
- Dr. Acula, in the episode "Fangboy" of the television series Fanboy & Chum Chum
- Dr. Acula, a joke told by stand up comedian Mitch Hedberg

== See also ==
- Acula, a location in Mexico
- Dracula (disambiguation)
