= Dracula (pinball) =

1979 pinball machine

- Manufacturer: Stern Electronics
- Release date: January 1979
- System: Stern M-100 MPU
- Design: Harry Williams
- Production run: 3,612 units (confirmed)

Dracula is a 1979 pinball machine released by Stern Electronics. The game is based on the character Dracula.

== Description ==
The pinball machine has unique rules and a quick gameplay with a well-made layout and lots to shoot at.

The cabinet side art features a dark purple design with a vampire. The full moon and a lone bat can be seen on the side of the backbox.

The game creates the illusion of a double playfield. The lower part of the playfield is open.

== See also ==
- Bram Stoker's Dracula (pinball)
- Monster Bash (pinball)
