= Dracula (color scheme) =

Color scheme for software

- The logo of Dracula, with a figure resembling Count Dracula
- Original author: Zeno Rocha
- Stable release: October 27, 2013; 12 years ago
- License: MIT License
- Website: draculatheme.com
- Repository: github.com/dracula/dracula-theme

Dracula is a color scheme for a large collection of desktop apps and websites, with a focus on code editors and terminal emulators. It was created in 2013 by Zeno Rocha. The scheme is available in dark mode and light mode (only with Dracula Pro). Packages that implement the color scheme have been published for many major applications, such as Visual Studio Code (2.9M installs), Sublime Text (160K installs), Atom (250K installs), JetBrains IDEs (820K installs), and 218 other applications as of November 2021.

== History ==
Zeno Rocha began working on Dracula in 2013 after having his computer stolen at a hospital in Madrid, Spain. Upon installing a new code editor and terminal emulator, he could not find a color scheme that he liked, so he decided to create his own. He always believed in the cost of context switching, therefore his goal was to create a uniform and consistent experience across all his applications. On October 27, 2013, he published the first Dracula theme for Zsh on GitHub.

On February 11, 2020, Rocha launched a premium version called Dracula Pro. On February 25, 2021, Dracula Pro reported $100k in sales. As of March 2023, Dracula Pro has reported over $250k in sales.

== Color palette ==
Dracula color palette
Name	Swatch	Hex	RGB	HSL
Background		#282a36	40 42 54	231° 15% 18%
Current Line		#44475a	68 71 90	232° 14% 31%
Foreground		#f8f8f2	248 248 242	60° 30% 96%
Comment		#6272a4	98 114 164	225° 27% 51%
Cyan		#8be9fd	139 233 253	191° 97% 77%
Green		#50fa7b	80 250 123	135° 94% 65%
Orange		#ffb86c	255 184 108	31° 100% 71%
Pink		#ff79c6	255 121 198	326° 100% 74%
Purple		#bd93f9	189 147 249	265° 89% 78%
Red		#ff5555	255 85 85	0° 100% 67%
Yellow		#f1fa8c	241 250 140	65° 92% 76%

== Reception ==
Over the years, Dracula became popular among software developers. Joey Sneddon of omg!ubuntu! recommended Dracula, noting its wide compatibility, as well as its open source nature. Writing for SpeckyBoy Magazine, Eric Karkovack reported that "Dracula is a dark theme that presents some great color contrast." Nick Congleton of LinuxConfig.org described it as one of the best Linux terminal color schemes. Sudo Null IT News said that the "Dracula Theme is a universal theme for almost everything". Lizzy Lawrence from Protocol reported that "Dracula is the dark mode color scheme with a cult following of coders".

== Gallery ==
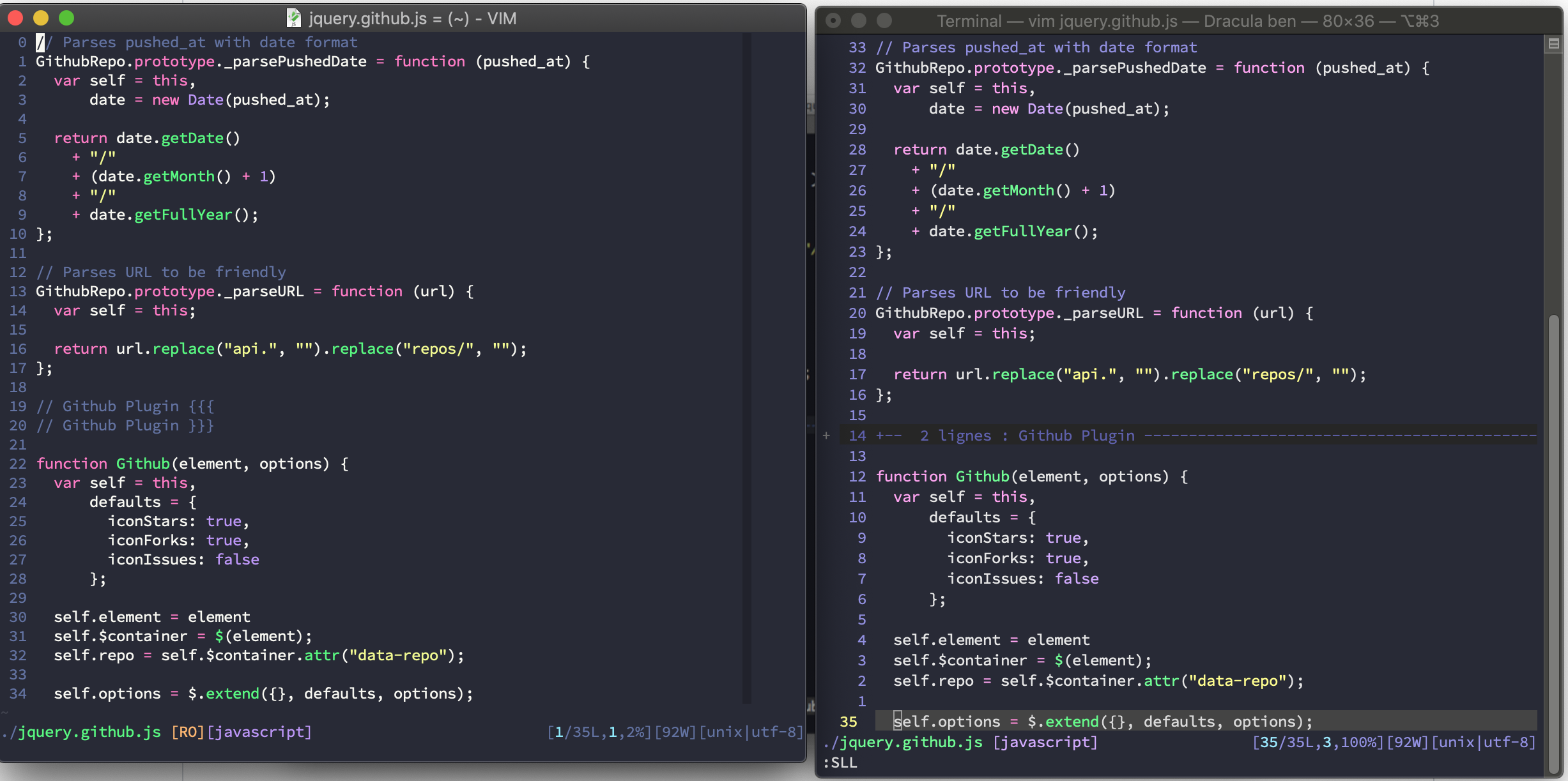
Dracula being used on Vim

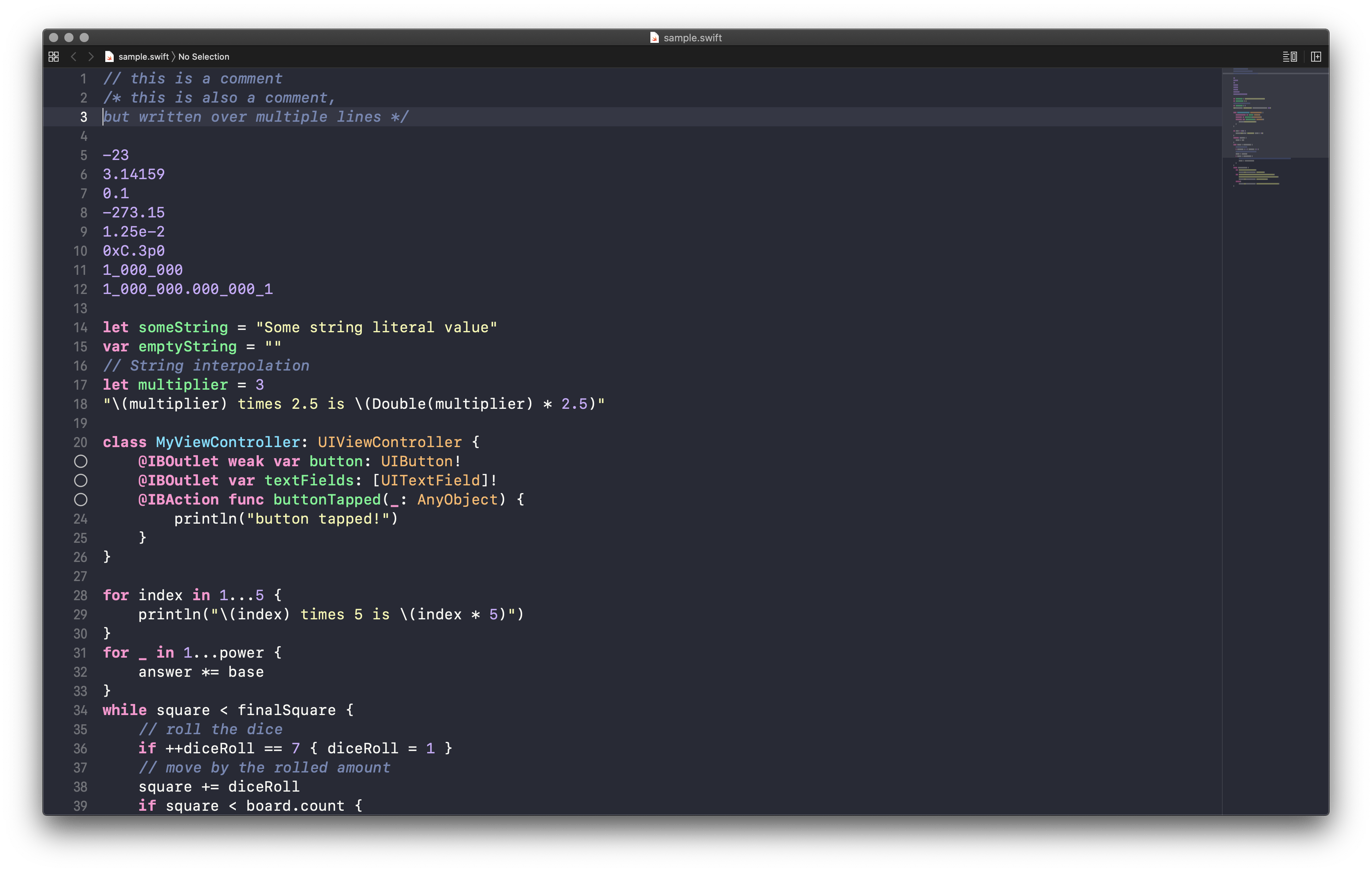
Dracula being used on Xcode

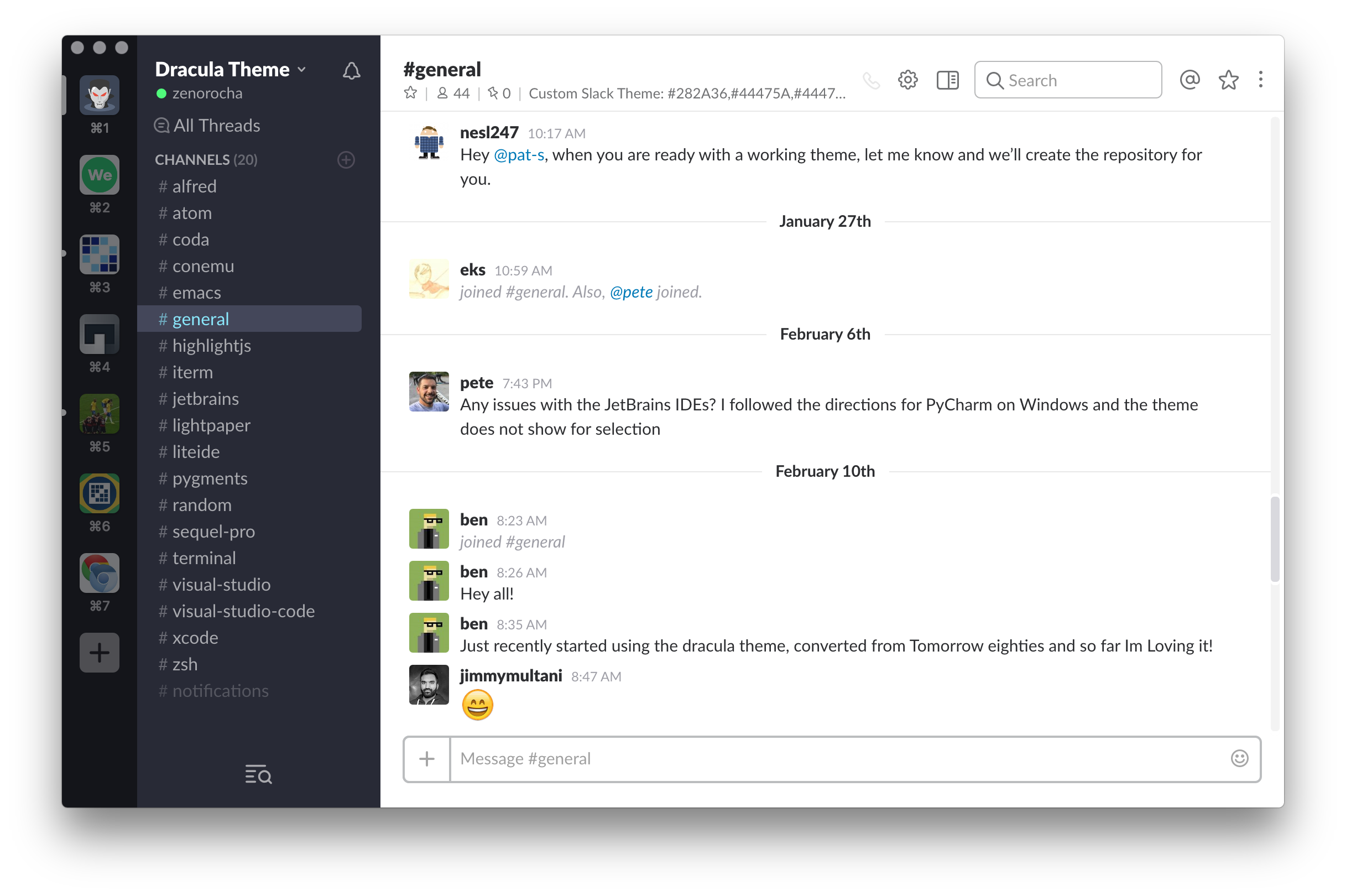
Dracula being used on Slack

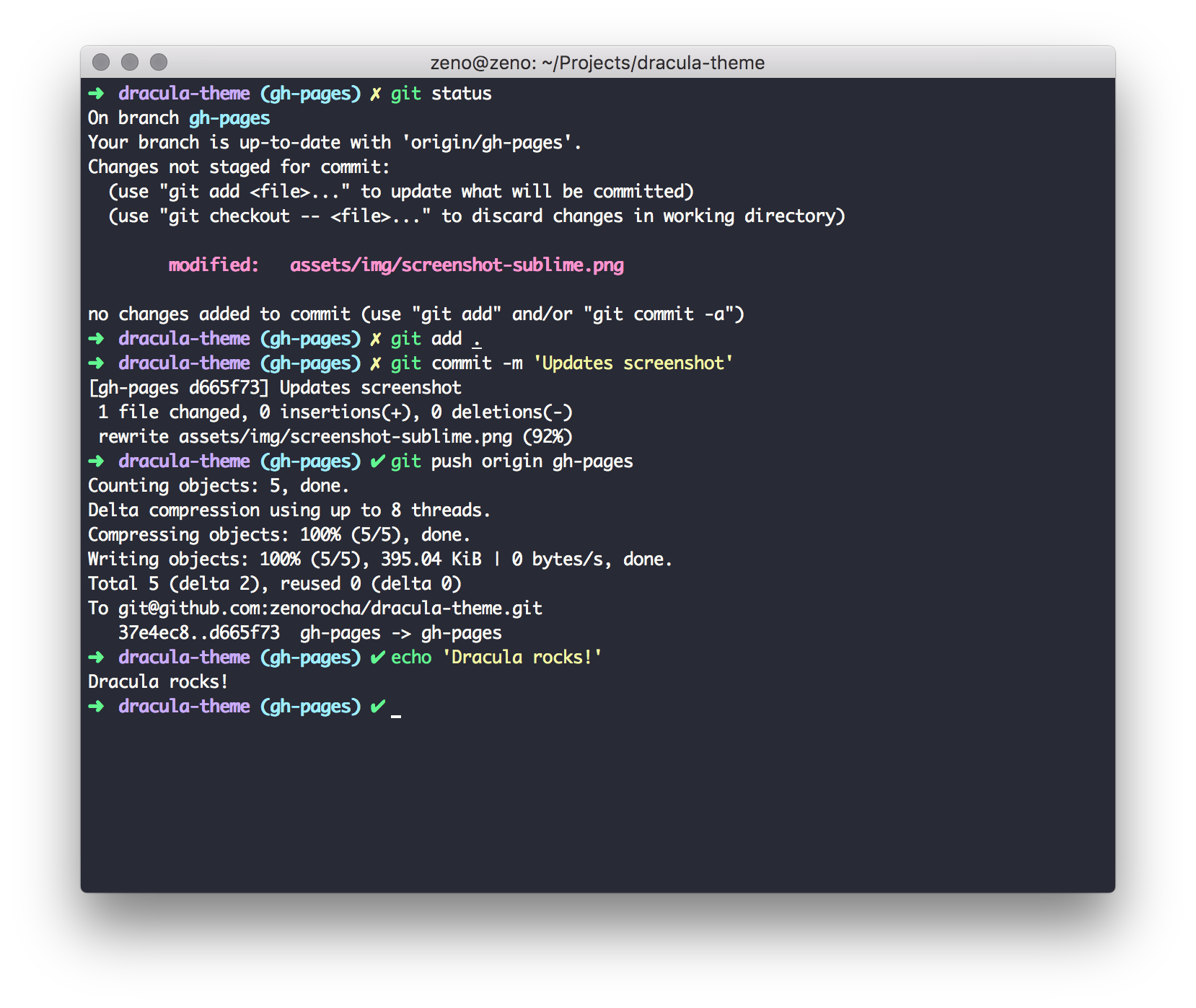
Dracula being used on ITerm2

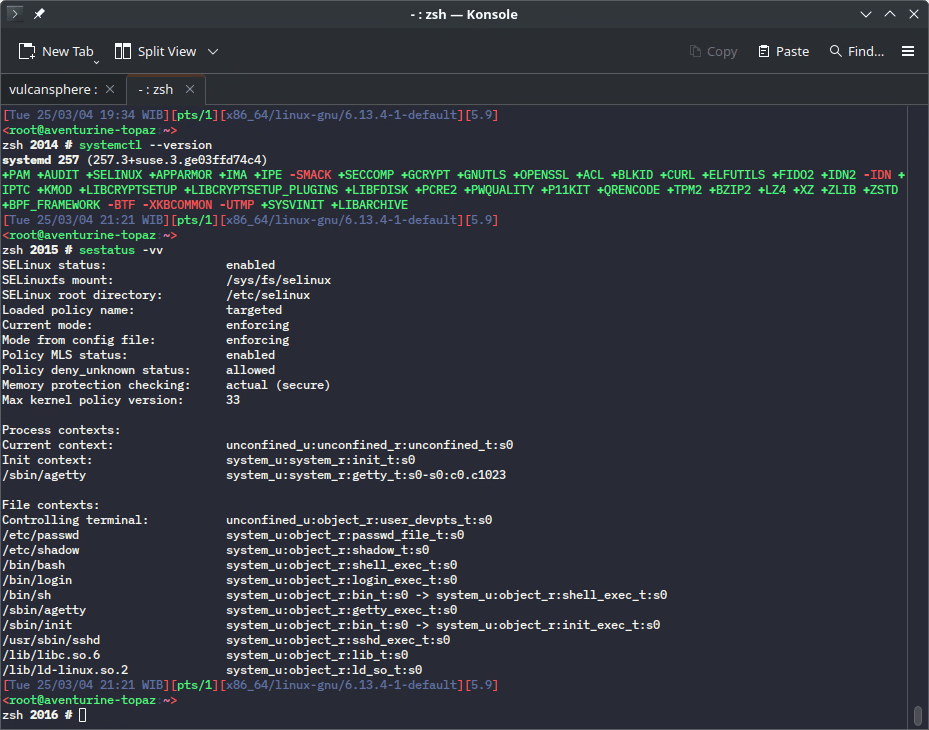
Dracula being used on Konsole

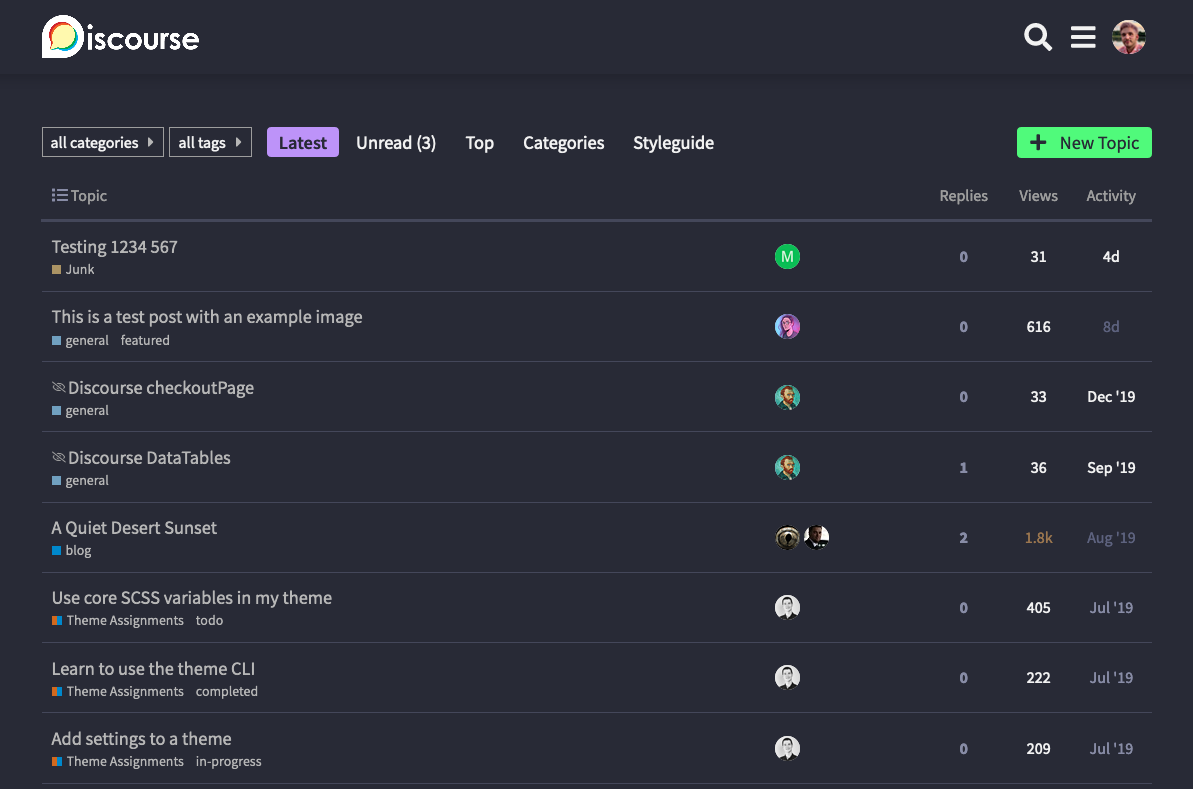
Dracula being used on Discourse

== See also ==
- Solarized – color scheme
