= Dracula the Undead (novel) =

1997 novel by Freda Warrington

- First edition
- Author: Freda Warrington
- Language: English
- Genre: Horror novel
- Publisher: Penguin Books
- Publication date: December 1997
- Media type: Print (Hardback)
- Pages: 320 pp (first edition)
- ISBN: 0-7278-6817-9

Dracula the Undead is a sequel written to Bram Stoker's novel Dracula, written by Freda Warrington. The book was commissioned by Penguin Books as a sequel to Stoker's original novel for the centenary of the latter's first publication. It takes place seven years after the original. It was originally published in 1997, and was brought back to print in 2009.
