= Shocking Shades of Claw Boys Claw =

Studio album by Claw Boys Claw
- Released: 1984
- Genre: Rock and roll
- Label: Polydor
- Producer: Claw Boys Claw

Claw Boys Claw chronology
Shocking Shades of Claw Boys Claw (1984)	With Love From The Boys (1986)

Shocking Shades of Claw Boys Claw is the debut studio album (released on 12" vinyl) by Dutch rock and roll band Claw Boys Claw. The album was released on their own label, Hipcat Records.

== History ==
Claw Boys Claw had been founded in 1983 by drummer Allard Jolles, who played guitar and sang in L'Attentat, another band from the "Amsterdam Guitar School". They won a talent show in November 1983 and, with that money, paid for three hours' of studio time; the result was Shocking Shades. Released in May 1984, the album proved popular despite (or perhaps in spite of) the low-fi sound quality, and the band became quite a hit on the Dutch club circuit, thanks in no small part to their energetic stage presence. After the album was released, Jolles returned to L'Attentat, though he later worked sometimes with Claw Boys Claw, producing Hitkillers/The Beast Of Claw Boys Claw, for instance.

When the band signed with Polydor in 1986, the album was re-released, again only on 12" vinyl. Following the band's return to the studio and the stage in 2008, Shocking Shades of Claw Boys Claw was re-released in 2008 by Play It Again Sam. The CD had five additional tracks: "So Mean" and "Love Like Seas" had been released as a 7" single in 1985; "Indian Wallpaper," "Dirty Dog," and "Foul Play" had been released as a 12" single in 1985.

== Track listing ==
No.	Title	Length
1.	"Business" (Te Bos/Cameron/Rossini/Jolles)	2:25
2.	"Venus" (Robbie van Leeuwen)	3:24
3.	"Melrose" (Te Bos/Cameron/Rossini/Jolles)	2:06
4.	"Hippy On The Highway" (Te Bos/Cameron/Rossini/Jolles)	4:04
5.	"Wanking Fun" (Te Bos/Cameron/Rossini/Jolles)	3:04
6.	"Cars" (Te Bos/Cameron/Rossini/Jolles)	2:39
7.	"Camargue" (Te Bos/Cameron/Rossini/Jolles)	1:08
8.	"Understanding Her" (Te Bos/Cameron/Rossini/Jolles)	2:48
9.	"Shake It On The Rocks" (Te Bos/Cameron/Rossini/Jolles)	3:33
10.	"You Gotta Go" (Te Bos/Cameron/Rossini/Jolles)	2:27
11.	"Feed Me To The Lions" (Te Bos/Cameron/Rossini/Jolles)	2:42
12.	"Phantom Shark" (Te Bos/Cameron/Rossini/Jolles)	3:54
13.	"Indian Wallpaper" (Te Bos/Cameron/Rossini/Jolles)	4:06
14.	"Love Like Seas" (Te Bos/Cameron/Rossini/Jolles)	4:56
15.	"So Mean" (Te Bos/Cameron/Rossini/Jolles)	3:37
16.	"Foul Play" (Te Bos/Cameron/Rossini/Jolles)	5:02
17.	"Dirty Dog" (Te Bos/Cameron/Rossini/Jolles)	1:43

- Tracks 13–17 only found on 2008 reissue.

== Personnel ==
- John Cameron – guitar
- Pete TeBos – vocals
- Bobbie Rossini – bass
- Allard Jolles – drums

== See also ==
- Claw Boys Claw discography
