= Hitkillers/The Beast Of Claw Boys Claw =

Hitkillers/The Beast of Claw Boys Claw

Compilation album by Claw Boys Claw
- Released: 1988
- Genre: Rock and roll
- Label: Megadisc
- Producer: Allard Jolles

Claw Boys Claw chronology
Hitkillers (1988)	Hitkillers/The Beast of Claw Boys Claw (1988)	Angelbite (1990)

Hitkillers/The Beast of Claw Boys Claw is a compilation album by Dutch rock and roll band Claw Boys Claw. The album, released on CD only, combines their fourth studio album Hitkillers (released only on vinyl) and a selection of earlier songs, re-recorded and remixed.

Hitkillers only contains cover versions of hit songs by a variety of other Dutch artists, such as Golden Earring ("Back Home"), Pussycat ("Mississippi"), Cuby & the Blizzards ("Appleknockers Flophouse") and The Nits ("In The Dutch Mountains"). While the Shocking Blue song "Venus" on this compilation album also fits the category, it was not part of the original Hitkillers album.

== Track listing ==
No.	Title	Length
1.	"Ruby Is The One" (C. Koerts)	3:40
2.	"Let Your Hair Hang Down" (J. Gimmik/E. Prehm/G. Hessing/C. Bergman/A. Mol)	2:30
3.	"Mississippi" (W. Theunissen/E. Hilberts)	3:10
4.	"In The Dutch Mountains" (H. Hofstede/R. Kloet/R.J. Stips)	3:10
5.	"Dracula!!" (Bob Bouber)	3:30
6.	"Appleknockers Flophouse" (E. Gelling/H. Muskee)	2:30
7.	"Back Home" (George Kooymans)	3:50
8.	"Ramona" (M. Wayne/L. Gilbert)	3:00
9.	"Down Man" (K. Lux)	4:00
10.	"Russian Spy And I" (Javelin)	2:50
11.	"Venus" (Robbie van Leeuwen)	4:00
12.	"So Mean" (Te Bos/Cameron/Rossini/Schrader)	3:10
13.	"That's Life" (Te Bos/Cameron/Rossini/Schrader)	3:00
14.	"Madcat" (Te Bos/Cameron/Rossini/Schrader)	3:30
15.	"Teenage Heartattack" (Te Bos/Cameron/Rossini/Schrader)	3:00
16.	"The Rose" (Te Bos/Cameron/Rossini/Schrader)	3:00
17.	"Locomotive Breath" (Ian Anderson)	3:15
18.	"Gimme A Break" (Te Bos/Cameron/Rossini/Schrader)	3:00
19.	"Shake It On The Rocks" (Te Bos/Cameron/Rossini/Schrader)	3:20
20.	"On The Run" (Te Bos/Cameron/Rossini/Schrader)	3:50
21.	"Ridin' The Blinds" (Te Bos/Cameron/Rossini/Schrader)	2:00

== Personnel ==
- John Cameron - guitar (lead vocal on "Let Your Hair Hang Down")
- Pete TeBos - vocals
- Bobbie Rossini - bass, backing vocals
- Marius Schrader - drums, backing vocals
- Hans Dulfer - saxophone ("Ruby Is The One")
- Tineke Schoenmaker - backing vocals ("Ruby Is The One," "Back Home")
- Herman Brood - piano ("Let Your Hair Hang Down," "Down Man")
- Jaap van Beusekom - banjo ("Mississippi")
- John Legrand - harmonica ("Appleknockers Flophouse," "Back Home")
- Cor Witjes - accordion ("Russian Spy and I")
- Allard Jolles - producer
- Frank van der Weij - mix, engineering (tracks 1–10)
- Michiel Jansen - engineering (tracks 11–21)
- Henk Temming - mix ("Down Man," "In The Dutch Mountains," Appleknockers Flophouse")

== Recording ==
- Hitkillers (tracks 1–10) recorded at Orkater Studios, Amsterdam; mixed at Zeezicht Studios
- The Beast of Claw Boys Claw (tracks 11–21) re-recorded and mixed at SPN Studios, Amsterdam

== See also ==
- Claw Boys Claw discography
