= Drăculea =

Drăculea may refer to:

- Vlad Drăculea, a Romanian name for Vlad the Impaler
- Drăculea (river), a tributary of the Lechința in Mureș County, Romania
- Drăculea Bandului, a village in the commune Band, Mureș County, Romania
