= J. D. Barker =

American author (born 1971)

- Barker in 2017
- Born: January 7, 1971 (age 55); Lombard, Illinois, U.S.
- Occupation: Novelist
- Writing career
- Genres: Suspense, thriller, horror
- Website: www.jdbarker.com

Jonathan Dylan Barker (born 1971) is an American author of suspense thrillers that incorporate elements of horror, crime, mystery, science fiction, and the supernatural. His debut novel, Forsaken, was a finalist for a Bram Stoker Award in 2014. He cites Stephen King, Dean Koontz, John Saul, and James Patterson among his influences.

== Early life and education ==
Barker was born January 7, 1971, in Lombard, Illinois, and spent the first fourteen years of his life in Crystal Lake, Illinois. At fourteen, Barker's family relocated to Englewood, Florida. He attended Lemon Bay High School and graduated in 1989. He would complete a degree in business at the Art Institute of Fort Lauderdale.

== Career ==
=== Pop culture magazines, "Revealed", Forsaken ===
While in college, a writing assignment came to the attention Paul Gallotta of Circus. Gallotta reached out to Barker and asked him to join the staff of 25th Parallel, where he worked alongside Marilyn Manson. He later interviewed celebrities for pop culture magazines including Seventeen and Teen Beat.

In 1992, Barker syndicated a small newspaper column called "Revealed" which centered on the investigation of haunted places and supernatural occurrences. He began work as a ghostwriter and book doctor, helping other authors for publication.

Stephen King read portions of Forsaken prior to publication and granted Barker permission to utilize the character of Leland Gaunt of King's Needful Things in the novel. Indie-published in late 2014, the book hit #2 on Audible, #44 on Amazon U.S., #2 on Amazon Canada, and #22 on Amazon UK. Forsaken was also nominated for a Bram Stoker Award (Best Debut Novel) and won a handful of others, including a New Apple Medalist Award.

=== Dracul, The Fourth Monkey, BookTok ===
After reading Forsaken, Bram Stoker's family contacted Barker and asked him to co-author a prequel to Dracula utilizing Stoker's original notes and journals, much of which had never been made public.

Barker's indie success drew the attention of traditional agents and publishers, and in early 2016 his debut thriller, The Fourth Monkey, sold in a series of pre-empts and auctions worldwide, with Houghton Mifflin Harcourt set to publish in the U.S. and HarperCollins in the UK. The book was also sold for both film and television. In September 2017, Putnam purchased the publishing rights for Dracul in a five-house auction with additional publishers worldwide, and Paramount Pictures optioned the film rights, with Andy Muschietti set to direct.

In January 2024, a number of book reviewers on TikTok and Instagram received an email from Best of BookTok—a PR firm focusing on social media influencers, which Barker co-founded—offering to pay reviewers to create racy content to promote his new book. After book reviewers objected and posted publicly about the content of the email, Barker sent the first of two public apologies. In subsequent interviews and articles, Barker stated the email was inadvertently sent to the wrong mailing list due to an error by a member of his staff.

=== Flatliners, Something I Keep Upstairs ===
In July 2024 it was announced J.D. Barker would write a reboot for the Flatliners film franchise, tentatively titled: Flatliners: Resurrection. The original film, written by Peter Filardi, released in 1990 by Columbia Pictures, was directed by Joel Schumacher, and starred Kiefer Sutherland, Julia Roberts, Kevin Bacon, Billy Baldwin, and Oliver Platt. Barker said he aimed to "honor the spirit" of the original while still taking the work in a new direction.

In 2025, Barker announced Something I Keep Upstairs, a thriller set on Wood Island, located off the coast of Maine and New Hampshire. The novel was released in May 2025 through Hampton Creek Press in partnership with Simon & Schuster. As part of the promotional efforts to market the book, Barker gave away an overnight stay in the haunted house upon which the novel is based to a randomly selected winner and three guests. The house has been the subject of numerous paranormal investigations. Two bodies were found on the island in 1972 and have yet to be identified. Prisoners were housed there during the Spanish-American War. The island was also used to quarantine those infected with yellow fever.

=== 4MK Prequels, A Caller's Game Movie ===
In February, 2026 Barker announced he'd written three prequels in his 4MK thriller series. The First Scarlet Door, the initial title in this new series, is scheduled to release domestically in September 2026 through Hampton Creek Press in partnership with Simon & Schuster. Additional publishers will release the book worldwide.

Screenwriter Jenna Mattison has been tapped to pen a feature adaptation of Barker's novel, A Caller's Game. The film will be produced by Greg Pedicin at Untitled along with Joel Gotler (Wolf of Wall Street) of Intellectual Property Group.

=== 4MK Television Series ===
Sylvester Stallone’s Balboa Productions has teamed with The Walking Dead (franchise) vet Channing Powell on a series adaptation of J.D. Barker’s serial killer thriller book series. The adaptation will draw from Barker’s original 4MK trilogy: The Fourth Monkey, The Fifth to Die, and The Sixth Wicked Child, as well as a recently announced prequel trilogy. Powell will showrun, write, and executive produce alongside Stallone and D. Matt Geller. Christian Bersani will oversee the project.

== Collaborations ==
In addition to writing his own novels, Barker has collaborated with James Patterson. Their first novel together, titled The Coast-to-Coast Murders, debuted at number 2 on the New York Times list on October 11, 2020. Their second collaboration, The Noise, released in August 2021, became New York Times bestseller and was optioned by Entertainment One. Their third release, Death of the Black Widow, released in April 2022 was also a New York Times bestseller. The fourth was Confessions Of The Dead, published in 2024. They released The Writer in March 2025. It debuted at #2 on the New York Times bestseller list.

Barker announced a new line of co-authored titles to be distributed by Simon & Schuster in early 2024. The first book, Heavy Are The Stones, was released in November 2024. It paired Barker with author and neuropsychologist, Christine Daigle. Barker said such partnerships allow him to explore themes and topics outside his wheelhouse and add an authenticity to the narrative.

== Autism ==
At the age of twenty-two, Barker was diagnosed with autism. He often refers to autism as his "superpower." He credits the condition with enhancing his writing abilities. He uses his platform as a means of raising awareness about autism. He frequently speaks about his experiences and works to break down the stigma surrounding neurodiversity.

== Bibliography ==
=== Novels ===
- —— (2014). Forsaken. Hampton Creek Press. ISBN 9780990694908.
- —— (2017). The Fourth Monkey. Houghton Mifflin Harcourt. ISBN 9780544968844.
- —— (2018). The Fifth to Die. Houghton Mifflin Harcourt. ISBN 9780544973978.
- —— (2019). The Sixth Wicked Child. Hampton Creek Press. ISBN 9780990694977.
- —— (2020). She Has a Broken Thing Where Her Heart Should Be. Hampton Creek Press. ISBN 9781734210415.
- —— (2021). A Caller's Game. Hampton Creek Press. ISBN 9781734210446.
- —— (2024). Behind a Closed Door. Hampton Creek Press/Simon & Schuster. ISBN 9781734210477.
- —— (2025). Something I Keep Upstairs. Hampton Creek Press/Simon & Schuster. ISBN 9798989265480.
- —— (2026). The First Scarlet Door. Hampton Creek Press/Simon & Schuster. ISBN 9798999350947.
- —— (2027). The Second You Lied. Hampton Creek Press/Simon & Schuster. ISBN 9798999350992.

=== Collaborations ===
- ——; Stoker, Dacre (2018). Dracul. G. P. Putnam's Sons. ISBN 9780735219342.
- ——; Patterson, James (2020). The Coast-to-Coast Murders. Little, Brown and Company. ISBN 9780316457422.
- ——; Patterson, James (2021). The Noise. Little, Brown and Company. ISBN 9780316499873.
- ——; Patterson, James (2022). Death of the Black Widow. Grand Central Publishing. ISBN 9781538709825.
- ——; Patterson, James (2024). Confessions of the Dead. Grand Central Publishing. ISBN 9781538769072.
- ——; Daigle, Christine (2024). Heavy Are the Stones. Hampton Creek Press/Simon & Schuster. ISBN 9798990746107.
- ——; Findorff, E.J. (2025). We Don't Talk About Emma. Hampton Creek Press/Simon & Schuster. ISBN 9798990746152.
- ——; Patterson, James (2025). The Writer. Little, Brown and Company. ISBN 9780316570008.
- ——; Bailey, Richard (2025). The Lies We Tell. Hampton Creek Press/Simon & Schuster. ISBN 9798990746121.
- ——; Dunn, Kyle (2025). The Finer Things. Hampton Creek Press/Simon & Schuster. ISBN 9798990746169.
- ——; Roach, Adam (2026). The Quiet Neighbor. Hampton Creek Press/Simon & Schuster. ISBN 9798990746190.
- ——; Logan, Patrick (2026). The Probability of Murder. Hampton Creek Press/Simon & Schuster. ISBN 9798999350930.
- ——; Adler, I.O. (2027). The Faces of Marcus Blake. Hampton Creek Press/Simon & Schuster. ISBN 9798999350985.
- ——; Patterson, James (2027). Face Off. Little, Brown and Company. ISBN 9780316600330.

=== Short stories ===
- "Mondays" (1993 - Last Exit Press)
- "Among Us" (1995 - Dark Crossing Magazine)
- "The Sitter" (1996 - Hidden Fears Magazine)
- "Wicked Ways" (1997 - Hidden Fears Magazine)
- "A Caller's Game" (1997 - Hidden Fears Magazine)
- "Room 108" (1998 - Hidden Fears Magazine)
- "Hybrid" (2012 - Among The Shadow Entertainment)
- "Of the Lake" (2016 - Ancient Enemies Anthology - Good Dog Publishing)

== Filmography ==
=== Television and streaming ===
- 4MK (Balboa Productions)
- The Noise (Entertainment One)

=== Feature films ===
- Dracul (Paramount Pictures)
- Behind A Closed Door (QC Entertainment)
- A Caller's Game (Untitled)

== Awards ==
Year	Nominee / work	Award	Result
2014	FORSAKEN - Superior Achievement in a First Novel	Bram Stoker Awards	Nominated
2018	DRACUL - Superior Achievement in a Novel	Bram Stoker Awards	Nominated
