= Dracula the Un-dead =

2009 novel by Dacre Stoker and Ian Holt

- First edition cover in the United Kingdom
- Author: Dacre Stoker, Ian Holt
- Language: English
- Genre: Horror novel
- Publisher: HarperCollins (UK); Dutton Adult (US)
- Publication date: September 24, 2009 (UK); October 13, 2009 (US)
- Publication place: United States
- Media type: Print (hardback & paperback)
- Pages: 480 pp (first edition)
- ISBN: 978-0-00-731034-0
- OCLC: 311776952

Dracula the Un-dead is a 2009 sequel horror novel to Bram Stoker's classic 1897 novel Dracula. The book was written by Bram Stoker's great-grandnephew Dacre Stoker and Ian Holt. Previously, Holt had been a direct-to-DVD horror screenwriter, and Stoker a track and field coach.

In the novel's afterword, the authors discuss the many alterations made to the original novel's events, due to the many inconsistencies in the original and the desire for the Stoker family to reassert control over Dracula fiction.

== Plot ==
On February 3, 1912, twenty-five years have passed since the vampire Count Dracula met his end at the hands of Jonathan Harker and Quincey Morris in Dracula. During this time, Jack Seward has become a morphine addict obsessed with destroying the undead, Arthur Holmwood hides behind his loveless marriage, Mina's remaining taint from Dracula has caused her to retain her youth, and Jonathan Harker drowns his sorrows and insecurities in alcohol and prostitutes. Mina and Jonathan have a son, Quincey Harker, who has grown to despise his father.

The novel begins with Seward tracking down suspected vampire Elizabeth Báthory. He tracks her to a theater in Paris, where Quincey has been forced to attend law school instead of pursuing a career in theater. Quincey learns that Basarab, a Romanian actor taking Europe by storm, is in town to perform in Richard III, and vows to see his performance even though it enrages his father. To his surprise, he is summoned by Basarab to his dressing room, where they strike up an unlikely friendship. They are disturbed when Báthory's vampiric attendants attack Basarab and are thwarted by Seward, who is killed in the process. Abraham Van Helsing, now a sickly old man, returns to London after hearing of Seward's death, believing Dracula has returned.

Through Basarab's urgings, Quincey becomes involved with the Lyceum Theatre where Bram Stoker is currently trying to stage a play of his failed novel. Quincey is shocked to find his parents and their former friends are characters in the novel. Quincey fervently reads the novel and researches Dracula, discovering he was a real-life Romanian prince nicknamed Vlad the Impaler. After the actor playing Dracula quits, he approaches Basarab about playing the role. Basarab is angry with the portrayal of Dracula as a monster, and decides to accept the role if only to right what he sees as slander to a national hero. Soon after, Quincey learns in the newspaper that his father was murdered in Piccadilly after being impaled on a large wooden stake.

While Quincey travels home, Mina is brought into the coroner's office to identify Jonathan's body. The detective, Cotford, insinuates that Van Helsing orchestrated both Jonathan and Seward's deaths, believing him to be Jack the Ripper. When Mina returns home to prepare for Jonathan's funeral, she finds Quincey enraged, having found the journals that his father and his friends kept while on their quest to hunt down Dracula, as well as learning of his mother's affair with Dracula. Consumed with grief, Quincey vows to hunt Dracula down and kill him. After leaving his mother behind, Quincey is accosted by Van Helsing, who warns the boy to give up his thirst for vengeance. Later that same night, Báthory sneaks into Mina's room and rapes her. Mina also consumes some of Báthory's blood, giving her visions of the latter's horrible past as an abused 15-year-old wife of Ferenc Nádasdy who was shunned by her family because of her homosexual tendencies.

Quincey pays a visit to Arthur Holmwood, who initially rebuffs Quincey's plea for help. Arthur changes his mind after a nightmare in which a skeletal Lucy Westenra attacks him. Unable to find Quincey, Arthur turns to Mina to help locate the boy before Dracula can get to him. Mina senses he has gone back to the Lyceum Theatre to get Basarab's help in destroying the Count. During a dress rehearsal, Báthory duels Basarab, smashing an oil lantern and setting Basarab and the theater on fire. Quincey arrives to find the theater ablaze, and despite his best efforts he cannot find his friend and is forced to escape the theater. Outside, Arthur and Mina, who feared Quincey dead, are overjoyed to see him alive, although Arthur is suspicious to see him completely unharmed. Cotford, who received a message that the key to the Ripper murders would be at the theater, tries to arrest Arthur, Mina and Quincey. Arthur and Quincey manage to escape, while Mina is arrested for the murder of one of Báthory's vampires.

After eluding the police, Arthur receives a message from Van Helsing, saying he has been attacked, and to meet him at a hotel where he is staying under Renfield's name. He and Quincey meet Van Helsing, who reveals that it was he who gave their story to Bram Stoker as a guide to future generations encountering the undead, and asks that the two join him. Van Helsing also tells them that Dracula's true name is Vladimir Basarab. Arthur furiously shoves the old man away and Van Helsing reveals himself as a newly turned vampire. During the struggle, Van Helsing shoots Arthur and gives Quincey one last chance to join their side. Arthur refuses and tackles Van Helsing out a window, where they both fall to their deaths.

Meanwhile, as Cotford and his officers take Mina back for questioning, they are overcome by an eerie red fog. The officers are picked off by Báthory in the form of a gargoyle. Realizing that Van Helsing's earlier rants about the supernatural were real after all, Cotford attempts to save Mina by getting her onto a London Underground train. He stabs the monster in the leg with a broken sword, but is decapitated by the gargoyle's tail. Mina gets on a train and is attacked by Báthory, before Dracula appears. It is revealed that Dracula and Báthory are cousins by marriage, but while Dracula still sees himself as a soldier of God, Báthory spurns God and all who worship Him. The two fight, and Dracula is overpowered and nearly killed, but Mina's quick thinking saves him, as Báthory is yanked from the train via a loose cable.

Mina takes Dracula to Carfax Abbey to make a final stand against Báthory. During the trip, Dracula says the real reason he came to London 25 years ago was to hunt Báthory, who was slaughtering women under the guise of Jack the Ripper. Though Dracula admits the heroes' acts were noble and chivalrous, he tells them they were hunting the wrong monster (the deaths on the ship that brought Dracula to England were actually caused by a virus among the crew; Dracula was forced to feed on Lucy after his arrival in England simply because of starving after so long without blood). Quincey also heads for Carfax, hoping to kill Dracula. Dracula appeals to Mina to let him turn her into a vampire, so that even if Báthory kills him, Mina will be able to destroy her in her weakened state. Fearing for Quincey's life, Mina eventually agrees. In consuming the tainted blood he put into Mina years ago, Dracula is shocked to find himself healed and his strength renewed. Quincey arrives at Carfax and is heartbroken to see his mother apparently dead in a coffin. She awakens and nearly attacks Quincey when blood from his wounds falls on her face. Overcome with grief, Quincey spurns Mina and, despite her pleas, chases off after Dracula.

Báthory and Dracula engage in a bloody duel, in which Báthory nearly kills Dracula with the same kukri blade that Jonathan used against him 25 years ago. Dracula, being the more skilled swordsman, outmaneuvers Báthory and stabs her in the chest with the blade. Báthory crumbles to dust as Quincey confronts Dracula, who refuses to defend himself. Dracula reveals that Quincey is truly his son and not Jonathan's. Refusing to become the monster that his father became, Quincey leaves both his parents behind. Dracula takes solace that his son is safe and succumbs to his wounds, falling off a cliff and bursting into flames as the sun rises. Mina, forsaken by her son and cursed to live eternally, follows Dracula off the cliff to be reunited with her two loves, Jonathan and Dracula.

Some time later, Quincey bribes his way aboard an ocean liner (which Bram Stoker is also on), hoping for a better life in America. Unknown to him, boxes labelled as property of Vladimir Basarab are also loaded on board. The ocean liner is revealed to be the Titanic (heavily implied to be setting course for its untimely fate).

== Reception ==
Critical reaction to Dracula the Un-dead has been mixed. Dracula scholar Leslie S. Klinger, writing for the Los Angeles Times, wrote that he did not consider the book to really be a sequel to Dracula because "no author would permit a sequel that boldly claims the original got the story wrong", but that it was "a fine book in its own right, one that pushes the story in unexpected directions while remaining true to the dark heart of the Transylvanian vampire-king".

Michael Sims of The Washington Post wrote, "Stoker and Holt dump everything into their furiously boiling kettle of clichés – bucketfuls of gore, creepy sex, a torture scene that comes across as lesbian vampire porn. ... But I don't mean to complain that this cheeseburger is not caviar. Un-dead is cinematically fast-paced, flying from London to Paris to Transylvania, and the historical texture is mostly convincing".

Sandy Amazeen of Monsters and Critics felt that "the pace is good and there are a few new plot twists, but not enough to make up for the overall canned feel of this disappointing attempt to redraw some old roles".

Bruce G. Smith of Blogcritics wrote, "It's quite realistic, scarily so, which makes Dracula the Un-dead a sequel worthy of the original. The story is a page-turner; the details are gripping; the horror, well, it's horrifying. It's a great book to read – albeit an imperfect one".

Monica Valentinelli of Flames Rising Horror Webzine wrote, "I believe that what they wanted was a book that would do all things for all readers, but in this case I feel that their lofty goals fall short" ... "If you want to pick up Dracula the Un-dead, pick it up for an interesting take on the 'happily-never-after'. Pick it up because you're interested in reading a different take on the vampires that aren't 'pretty' but truly monstrous. For on that note, Dracula the Un-dead does succeed".

Moira Macdonald wrote in the Seattle Times, "it's an odd piece of work, bearing about as much resemblance to the original as Bela Lugosi does to Robert 'Twilight' Pattinson".

Amy Gwiazdowski, writing for Bookreporter.com, wrote: "In the end, Dracula the Un-dead is a fast read and exciting in parts, but I think too much is asked of readers of the original in having to forgo old beliefs of who and what Dracula is. It's best to just enjoy it for what it is: another vampire story for October".

Winnipeg Free Press reviewer Kenneth MacKendrick called it "tempting enough to read and bad enough to be controversial, striking a balance between sensationalism and mediocrity".
