= Bram Stoker's Dracula (pinball) =

1993 pinball machine

- Manufacturer: Williams
- Release date: April 1993
- System: Williams WPC (Fliptronics II)
- Design: Barry Oursler, Mark Sprenger
- Programming: Bill Pfutzenreuter
- Artwork: Mark Sprenger
- Mechanics: Zofia Bil
- Music: Paul Heitsch
- Sound: Paul Heitsch
- Animation: Scott Slomiany
- Production run: 6,801

Bram Stoker's Dracula is a 1993 pinball machine released by Williams. It is based on the 1992 film of the same name.

== Design ==
Early designs of the game were based on the Alien 3 film, but when the script was rewritten this was abandoned, and adjustments were made to fit Bram Stoker's Dracula.

A prototype of the game used a solenoid to trigger a model of Dracula to sit up in the coffin at the start of coffin multiball, but this was not used in production machines due to space restrictions and cost constraints.

The game is characterized by its unusual blood-red DMD display, which has animated blood drips while the score is displayed. the speaker panel is tinted in red to tie-in with this screen rather than the orange DMD colour used on other machines. The outside of the cabinet shows a castle underneath a moon, and above a village, with the name Bram Stoker's Dracula in blood red. The translite shows a montage of actors from the film including Anthony Hopkins and Gary Oldman. The slingshot covers on the original production version show bricks of the castle; an additional stacked cover with Keanu Reeves and Winona Ryder was produced but not released with the machine due to Williams not getting the rights to the likeness of one of these actors. These additional covers were easy to obtain as spare parts after release of the machine.

It features a unique multiball mode known as "Mist Multiball," where a magnet drags a pinball across the playfield. Optical beams and sensors are used to detect the presence or absence of the ball along the path of the magnet and the player is required to knock it loose from the magnet's grasp to start the mode.

The game uses lightning flippers which are slightly shorter than a standard flipper.

Gary Oldman recorded voicework for the game in England, both reprising lines from the film, and original lines.

The game can dim the illumination for special effects during attract mode. The game has a setting (A.2 08) which is used to increase the volume for certain quotes or in particular game modes.

== Layout ==
The features on the game follow the plot of the film. The top of the playfield has the entrance for the video mode. The left side of the machine represents Carfax Abbey, and the right side represents Dracula's castle in Romania. The shot under the right ramp leads to a coffin, which lights up when Dracula speaks. The top of the machine has three rollover lanes located above three pop bumpers; a half orbit on the right side leads back to these rollovers. To the left of the pop bumpers is a short lane ending with a sinkhole. The game has two ramps, each of which leads towards the flipper on the opposite side of the machine, or can be diverted to lock balls. A sinkhole, called the "Dungeon" is located on the right side of the machine underneath the scenery representing the castle. The game has a bank of three targets below the lower pop bumper, and another bank on the left side of the playfield. A sinkhole on the left side of the machine called "The Asylum" represents where Renfield is kept prisoner.

== Gameplay ==
Unlike many pinball machines of the early 1990s the game does not use a series of modes, but has gameplay focused on multiballs. Each ball begins with a skillshot where the player times the launch of the ball to coincide with gargoyles shown on the display, and back panel.

=== Multiballs ===
The game has three multiballs. Coffin multiball is started after the player locks three balls at the coffin underneath the right ramp. During multiball play each hit of the coffin lock lights a letter in D-R-A-C-U-L-A shown near the bottom of the playfield, with animations of a stake driven gradually further through Dracula's heart.

Castle multiball is started after completing the middle bank of targets and locking three balls. With a series of shots up the left ramp and the sinkhole beside it very high jackpot scores can be awarded.

After sufficient shots up the left ramp, the player can hit the nearby sinkhole to start mist multiball. The ball is then dragged across the playfield using a magnet underneath it, and the player attempts to knock it off the magnet by hitting it with a second ball.

Multi-multiball is played with four balls after starting coffin multiball, castle multiball, and mist multiball at the same time. A playfiled insert lights for 3x normal scoring, or 2x if only two multiballs are active.

=== Other features ===
The game has a video mode where the player has a limited number of bullets to hit a series of wolves appearing on the left and right sides of the display.

After sufficient shots up the left ramp "Bats" starts where the player hits switches in a limited time to score gradually reducing points. "Rats" is similarly started at the "Dungeon", but each switch scores a fixed score. When lit, the left sinkhole gives a mystery award.

In addition to the high scores, the game allows players to enter their initials for the highest number of ramps hit during a game.

=== Easter eggs ===
If the player presses the launch button when Dracula's eyes are shown on the display the game shows a picture of "Fluffy the vampire". After a ball falls into the asylum sinkhole, an extra animation of Renfield in his cell can be triggered.

== Reception ==
In a review for The Flipside, the quotes and animations were praised, but frustrated that most of them are only in modes the novice player is unlikely to experience, although they are likely to see the mist magnet carry a ball across the playfield.

Pinball Player found Dracula to be an exciting game with quality sound and features, and is a more difficult game than most pinball machines but this fits the theme.

A retro review by Nudge Magazine found the design and gameplay fit the theme, but noted the technical limitations of the sound chipset. The strength of the game was its replay value coupled with the relative simplicity.

== Digital versions ==
A licensed digital version of the table released for The Pinball Arcade for several platforms in 2014. It was delisted on June 30, 2018 due to the loss of the Williams license.
