= Valea Dracului =

Valea Dracului may refer to several rivers in Romania:

- Valea Dracului, a tributary of the Prahova in Prahova County
- Valea Dracului, a tributary of the Târnava Mare in Mureș County
- Valea Dracului, a tributary of the Timiș in Brașov County
