= Claw Boys Claw =

Dutch rock band

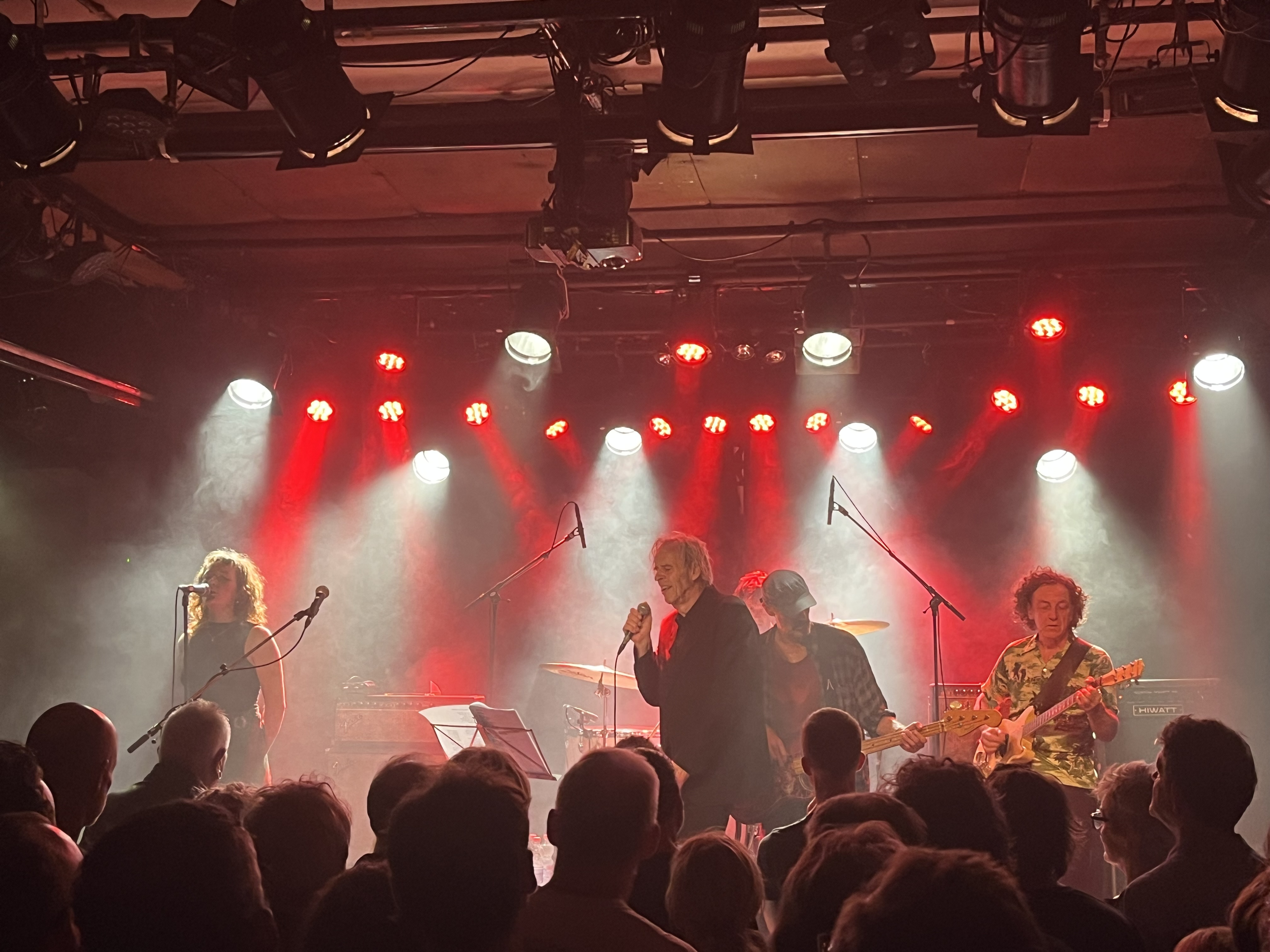
- Claw Boys Claw - Rotterdam, 2025

Background information
- Origin: Amsterdam, Netherlands
- Genres: Rock, punk rock, rhythm & blues
- Years active: 1983–1997, 2006–present
- Labels: Polydor, PIAS
- Members: Peter te Bos; John Cameron
- Past members: Allard Jolles; Bobbie Rossini; Marius Schrader; Arno Kooy; Geert de Groot; Marc Lamb
- Website: clawboysclaw.nl

Claw Boys Claw are a Dutch band formed in Amsterdam. The core members of the band are Peter te Bos (vocals) and John Cameron (guitar). After some years of inactivity, the band started playing live again in 2007.

Claw Boys Claw never attained much commercial success, and a venture into the American market was unsuccessful.

== History ==
=== Beginnings ===
Claw Boys Claw was founded in 1983 by guitarist Allard Jolles, at the time guitarist and singer of L'Attentat, though he played drums in his newly founded band. The original four members were Jolles, Peter Te Bos, John Cameron, and bassist Bobbie Rossini. Their "garage rock," as the Dutch termed it (a lo-fi mixture of rock and roll and punk), quickly gained popularity, and in 1984 the band releases their first album, Shocking Shades Of Claw Boys Claw, containing among others a cover of the song "Venus" by Shocking Blue. The album was recorded in three hours and cost 500 guilders (some $250 at the time), money the band had won in a talent show. While not a commercial success at the time, the album (which was reissued in 2008) was later called one of the best records in the history of Dutch pop music by Trouw. Jolles leaves the band in May 1985 to focus on L'Attentat, and is replaced by Marius Schrader.

The singles "So Mean" and "Indian Wallpaper" were successful in the underground scene, but the 1986 album With Love From The Boys, released by Polydor, broke through to a broader audience, selling 8000 copies. That year the band played at Pinkpop festival in the Netherlands, and under the pseudonym "The Hipcats" opened up for Nick Cave and the Bad Seeds, playing mainly cover songs. They even released a Christmas single, "Blue Bells." In 1987 Claw Boys Claw played at the Roskilde Festival and released their third full-length album, Crack My Nut, their last on Polydor. There was disagreement between the band and their label: Peter Te Bos, in an interview with the leading Dutch music magazine, Muziekkrant OOR, complained that they received no support from their label and that their records were not promoted at all. The band received the prestigious BV Popprijs from the Christian-Democrat minister of culture Elco Brinkman, and Te Bos caused a stir by kissing the amazed Brinkman as he handed Te Bos the award; five years later the photograph was on the cover of André Nuchelman's study of the difficult relations between the Dutch government and popular music, "Dit gebonk dient tot het laatste toe te worden bestreden": Popmuziek en overheidsbeleid 1975–2001.

Hoping to reach a larger audience, the band performed at the New Music Seminar in New York in 1988, but success in the United States never came about. They met with John Cale, who was interested in producing the band's next album. Despite having built a great reputation as live-artists, the band were dropped by Polydor because of disappointing sales. The band subsequently released the album Hitkillers on the Megadisc label, an album consisting of Nederpop covers. In February 1989, Rossini and Schrader left the band and were replaced by Marc Lamb en Arno Kooy from The Agentz. Despite trouble with personnel and disappointing commercial success, the band's reputation seemed solid, and they were called one of the most prominent bands of the 1980s.

=== Middle years ===
Claw Boys Claw attempted a more accessible sound on Angelbite (1990). Rumors of a cooperation with John Cale had persisted, but Angelbite was produced by Steve Parker (who had worked with British band The Fall and Dutch singer Mathilde Santing), and recorded at ICP studios in Brussels. They played Parkpop in 1991, and Kooy was replaced by Geert de Groot (formerly of the Fatal Flowers). The Dutch press considered $uga[r] (1992) a highpoint for the band, and it established a style the band will follow on every album after, a circuitous and melodic "brooding swamp rock" The album was recorded at Orkater studios in Amsterdam and produced by Magic Stick (Michel Schoots, of the Urban Dance Squad). The ballad "Rosie" was the band's first single to score in the Dutch Top 40, and the song is still their best-known.

In 1993 they played Pinkpop again and opened for U2 three nights in a row in the Kuip, the largest crowd the band had ever played for, but after 1994's Nipple, recorded in the band's own studio and produced by Luc Suèr, the band lost momentum. Te Bos returned to his old profession, graphic design; the band released one more CD, Will-o-the-Wisp (recorded in Smecky Barrandov Studio in Prague, and produced by Henk Jonkers and Frank van der Weij), and played one more memorable show: in 1998, they played in Paradiso in Amsterdam, performing covers of Iggy and the Stooges as part of the "Marlboro Flashback" series, which even gave the Claw Boys Claw the rare opportunity for a TV-special. The band stopped performing around 2000.

=== Rebirth, 25th anniversary ===
In the spring of 2006 the Claw Boys Claw were working on a new album and wanted to start touring again. According to Te Bos, he and Cameron had written some seventy songs since 2002, some of which were released in February 2008 on Pajama Day, on the Belgian label Play It Again Sam. The album was welcomed by Dutch critics, who hailed their lyrical maturity, honesty, and musical ability. Most critics noted that the Claw Boys Claw had dialed down the volume, but still praised the album—Belgian weekly HUMO said that the album contained the most exciting rock songs they had heard in years and gave it four out of five stars, and while the reviewer from De Recensent found only three worthwhile songs on the CD, the Dutch paper De Volkskrant thought it a brooding and dark album containing "beautiful secrets." Dutch music magazine Muziekkrant OOR concurred, calling the album "swamp rock" full of tension, and "a record to take to bed."

Starting on 16 November 2007, the group played live shows again with a new line-up. online music magazine LiveXS calling their performance at the January 2008 Noorderslag festival in Groningen "legendary." The "country's most legendary live band" played their first radio show in a decade in January 2008, for VPRO's 3VOOR12. They continued to play all around the country, in The Hague on the night before the Koninginnedag celebrations, for instance. Their most visible show in 2008 was probably at Lowlands (alongside, for instance, the Sex Pistols), a festival for which Te Bos also designed the logo and all other objects, even the gate to the festival grounds. The band's dynamic live performances were honored with the 2008 "Iron Stage Beast", the VNPF LiveXS Award for best show; LiveXS called the band "better than ever" in a review of a show in the Melkweg in December 2008.

In honor of their 25th anniversary, on 2 June 2008, HipCat/PIAS Benelux released Shocking Shades Of Claw Boys Claw on CD, remastered with five additional tracks. Also reissued were $uga[r], with two additional tracks, Nipple, with three additional tracks, and Will-O-The-Wisp, with five additional tracks, all by EMI/Msi Music/Super D. The band continued to tour and played a festival in Utrecht around Easter 2009. A new album, Hammer, was released on 1 March 2013.

== Members ==
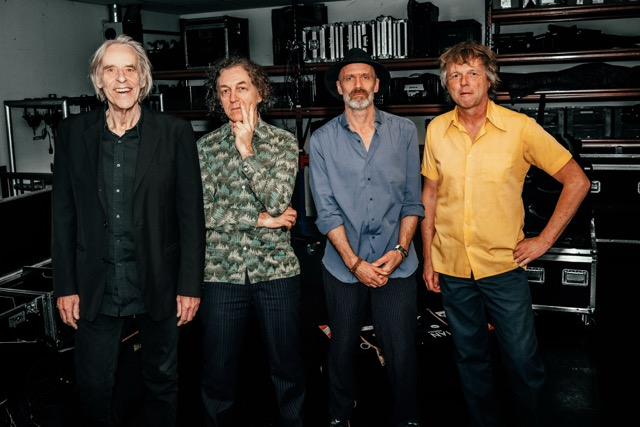
Claw Boys Claw in 2025

=== Current members ===
- Peter te Bos – vocals (1983–present)
- John Cameron – guitar (1983–present)

=== Past members ===
- Allard Jolles – drums (1983–1985)
- Bobbie Rossini – bass (1983–1989)
- Marius Schrader – drums (1985–1989)
- Arno Kooy – bass (1989–1991)
- Geert de Groot – bass (1991–c.2000)
- Marc Lamb – drums (1989–2010)

=== Touring musicians ===
- Jeroen Kleijn – drums (2012–present)
- Marcus Bruystens – bass (2007–present)

== Discography ==
=== Albums ===
- Shocking Shades of Claw Boys Claw (LP, Hipcat, 1984; LP, Polydor, 1987; CD, Hipcat/PIAS 2008)
- Now! (live EP, 1985)
- With Love From The Boys (LP, Polydor, 1986)
- Claw Boys Claw 3 in 1 (compilation; LP, Polydor, 1987)
- Crack My Nut (LP/CD, Polydor, 1987)
- Hitkillers (LP, Megadisc, 1988)
- Hitkillers/The Beast Of Claw Boys Claw (compilation; CD, Megadisc, 1988)
- Angelbite (LP/CD, Solid, 1990)
- $uga(r) (CD, EMI, 1992)
- Nipple (CD, EMI, 1994)
- Will-O-The-Wisp (CD, EMI, 1997)
- Pajama Day (CD, PIAS, 2008)
- Hammer (CD, PIAS, 2013)
- It's not me, The horse is not me - Part 1 (CD/LP, 2018)
- Kite (LP/CD, Excelsior Recordings, 2021)
- Fly (LP/CD, Excelsior Recordings, 2025)
