= Count Dracula =

Title character of Bram Stoker's Dracula

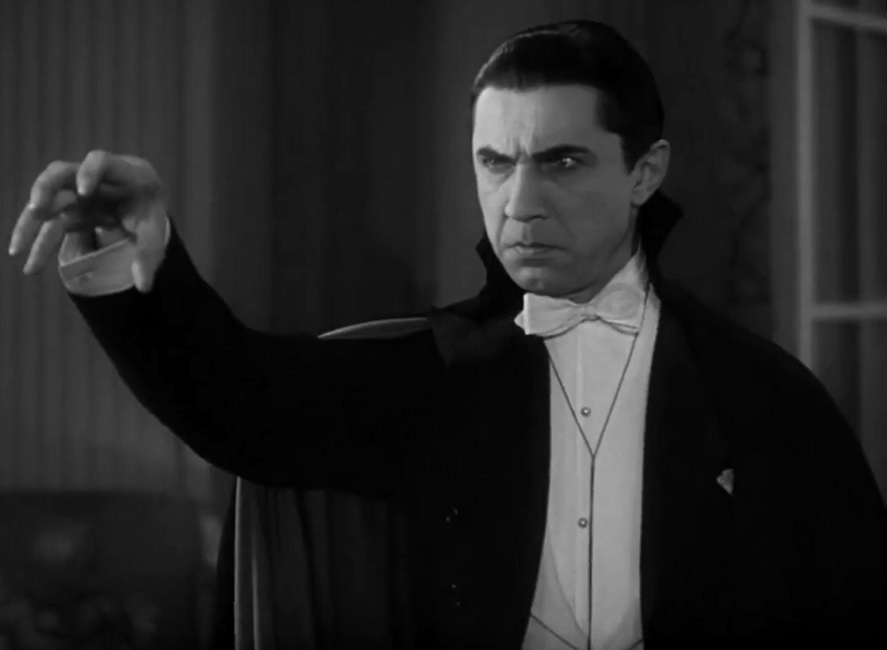
- Bela Lugosi as Count Dracula in the 1931 film Dracula
- First appearance: Dracula (1897)
- Created by: Bram Stoker
- Based on: Henry Irving, Vlad Dracula (proposed decades after the novel's publication)
- Portrayed by: See below

In-universe information
- Aliases: Dracula; Count De Ville; Mr. De Ville
- Nicknames: Evil eye; Ördög; Pokol; Stregoika; Vrolok; Vlkoslag; D.; Nosferatu; Drac
- Species: Vampire (also has been classified as an undead human, a dhampir, and a werewolf)
- Gender: Male
- Titles: Count, Transylvanian noble; Boyar; Voivode; Solomonari; King Vampire
- Spouses: Brides of Dracula (unclear); Elisabeta (in some adaptations, based on the 1992 film)
- Home: Transylvania

Count Dracula (/ˈdræk.jʊl.ə, -.jə-/) is a fictional character and title antagonist of Bram Stoker's gothic horror novel Dracula (1897). He is considered the prototypical and archetypal vampire in subsequent works of fiction. Some aspects of the character have been suggested to have been inspired by the 15th-century Wallachian prince Vlad III Dracula, although the identification of Stoker's Dracula with Vlad the Impaler was proposed only decades after the novel's publication. It is widely believed to be inspired by Sir Henry Irving, for whom Stoker was the personal assistant, and possibly other actors with aristocratic backgrounds whom Stoker had met during his life. Count Dracula is one of the best-known fictional figures of the Victorian era.

One of Dracula's most famous powers is his ability to turn others into vampires by biting them and drinking their blood. Other characteristics have been added or altered in subsequent popular fictional works, including books, films, cartoons, and video games.

== Stoker's creation ==
=== Life and undeath ===
The character first appeared in Bram Stoker's novel Dracula, published in 1897. The novel is an epistolary tale, in which Count Dracula is depicted by multiple narrators from different perspectives.

Dracula is an undead, centuries-old vampire, who inhabits a decaying castle in Transylvania, in the Carpathian Mountains near the Borgo Pass. The only other inhabitants of the castle are three beautiful, female vampires. The vampires rest in tombs in the castle's ruined chapel.

The narrators describe Dracula as tall and thin. He looks old, but appears younger later in the novel. He initially has white hair and a heavy white moustache that covers most of his cruel mouth and ruddy lips. He has sharp white teeth that protrude over his lips. His ears are pointed at the top. He has broad hands with hairy palms and long fingernails cut to a point. His nose is aquiline and his eyebrows are bushy and almost meet. His eyes appear red.

He is a nobleman who claims to be a Székely descended from Attila the Hun and the historical Voivode Dracula. (Note: The historical Draculas were Voivodes of Wallachia, not Transylvania, and were Wallachs, not Székelys.)

We Székelys have a right to be proud, for in our veins flows the blood of many brave races who fought as the lion fights, for lordship. ... they found the Huns, whose warlike fury had swept the earth like a living flame, till the dying peoples held that in their veins ran the blood of those old witches, who, expelled from Scythia, had mated with the devils in the desert. Fools, fools! What devil or what witch was ever so great as Attila, whose blood is in these veins? ... And when the Hungarian flood swept eastward, the Székelys were claimed as kindred by the victorious Magyars, and to us for centuries was trusted the guarding of the frontier of Turkey-land. ... When was redeemed the great shame of my nation, the shame of Cassova, when the flags of the Wallach and the Magyar went down beneath the Cresent, who was it but one of my own race who as Voivode crossed the Danube and beat the Turk on his own ground? This was a Dracula indeed! ... Ah, young sir, the Székelys – and the Dracula as their heart's blood, their brains, and their swords – can boast a record that mushroom growths like the Habsburgs and the Romanoffs can never reach."

— Jonathan Harker's journal, Dracula, Chapter 3

Dracula's nemesis, Abraham Van Helsing, speculates that Dracula may be the 15th-century Voivode Dracula: "He must indeed have been that Voivode Dracula who won his name against the Turk, over the great river on the very frontier of Turkey-land. If it be so, then was he no common man: for in that time, and for centuries after, he was spoken of as the cleverest and the most cunning, as well as the bravest of the sons of the land beyond the forest."

Van Helsing comments on Dracula's life as a human:

he was in life a most wonderful man. Soldier, statesman, and alchemist - which latter was the highest development of the scientific knowledge of his time. He had a mighty brain, a learning beyond compare, and a heart that knew no fear and no remorse... there was no branch of knowledge of his time that he did not essay.

Van Helsing states that the Draculas studied the black arts at the academy of Scholomance in the Carpathian Mountains, overlooking Lake Hermannstadt (modern Sibiu) and had a deep knowledge of alchemy and magic. As payment for their tuition, the devil claimed every tenth student.

=== Narrative ===
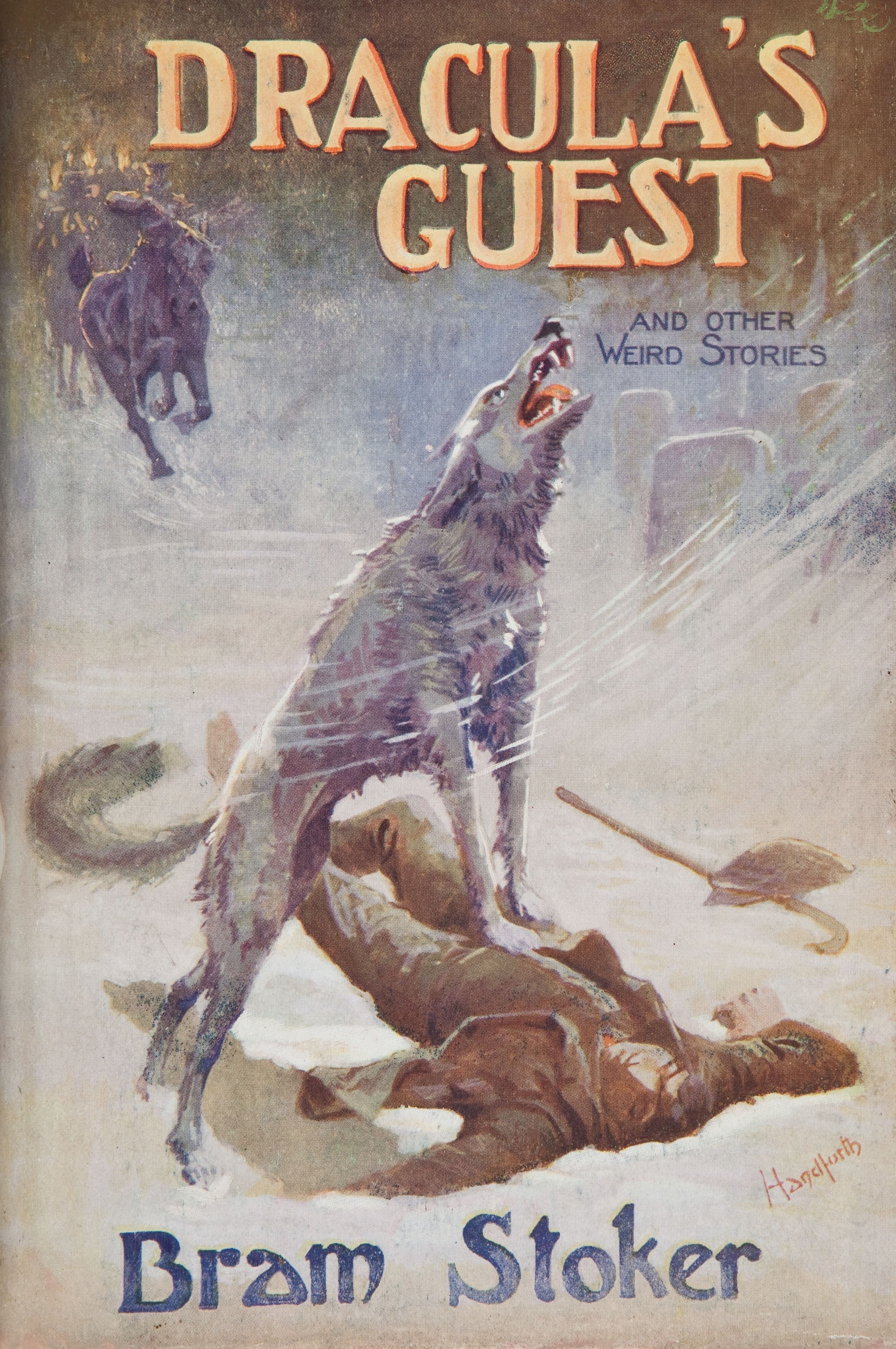
Cover of Dracula's Guest and Other Weird Stories, a collection of short stories authored by Bram Stoker

In Stoker's short story "Dracula's Guest" (published 1914), an unnamed young Englishman is visiting Munich on his way to Transylvania and decides to take a drive in the countryside on Walpurgis Night. He leaves the carriage to walk to an abandoned village. He turns to look at the departing carriage and sees a tall, thin man appear over the crest of a hill. The horses are terrified at the sight of the man, and the carriage bolts away towards Munich. A storm begins and the Englishman hears the howl of a wolf. He reaches a graveyard and stands before a sepulchre where he finds a beautiful woman, apparently asleep on the bier. A lightning bolt strikes the tomb and kills the woman. The man is thrown from the tomb by an invisible force and falls unconscious. He regains his senses and realises that a huge wolf is sitting on his chest and licking his throat. Mounted soldiers bearing torches approach and the wolf flees. The soldiers return the Englishman to his Munich hotel. The hotel keeper explains that when the coachman had returned and had told him what had happened he had decided to send out a search party. He had also received a telegram from the Englishman's host, Dracula, warning him to take good care of his guest as there were "dangers from snow and wolves and night".

In Dracula, Jonathan Harker, an English solicitor, visits Count Dracula at his castle in the Carpathian Mountains to help the Count purchase a house near London. Harker wanders the castle at night and encounters three vampire women; Dracula intervenes and gives the women a bag containing a kidnapped child. Dracula leaves the castle, abandoning Harker to the women. Harker, having realised Dracula's true nature, escapes and ends up delirious in a Budapest hospital. Dracula takes a ship to England with boxes of earth from his castle. When the ship runs aground at Whitby, a large dog is seen leaping ashore. All the ship's crew are dead or missing.

Dracula secretly attacks Lucy Westenra, a friend of Harker's fiancée Mina Murray. Lucy's fiancé, Arthur Holmwood, and his friends Dr John Seward and Quincey Morris are alarmed by her declining health. Seward's old teacher — Professor Abraham Van Helsing — determines the nature of her condition, but he refuses to disclose it, instead diagnosing it as acute blood-loss. Despite his efforts, Lucy dies. After her burial, Van Helsing deduces that Lucy has become a vampire. Seward, Morris, Holmwood, and Van Helsing go to her tomb and confirm Van Helsing's fear. They stake her heart, behead her, and fill her mouth with garlic. Harker and his new bride Mina return and join the campaign against Dracula.

"Listen to them—the children of the night. What music they make!".

— Count Dracula to Jonathan Harker, referring to the howling of the wolves. Dracula, Chapter 2.

Van Helsing explains that they must destroy Dracula's boxes of earth to weaken his power. After Dracula learns of the group's plot against him, he secretly attacks Mina three times, drinking her blood before forcing her to drink his on the final visit, thereby cursing her to become a vampire after death. The men discover that Dracula has distributed his boxes of earth around various properties in London. After sterilising most of the boxes, the group learns that Dracula is fleeing to his castle in Transylvania with his last box. Using hypnosis, Van Helsing exploits Mina's faint psychic connection to Dracula to track his movements.

In Galatz, Romania, the vampire hunters split up. Van Helsing and Mina go to Dracula's castle, where the professor destroys the vampire women. Harker and Holmwood pursue Dracula's boat on the river, while Morris and Seward follow them on land. Dracula's box is loaded onto a wagon by Romani men; the hunters attack and rout the Romani. Harker decapitates Dracula as Morris stabs him in the heart. Dracula crumbles to dust, freeing Mina from her vampiric curse.

=== Powers and weaknesses ===
Count Dracula is portrayed in the novel using many different supernatural abilities, and is believed to have gained his abilities through dealings with the devil. Chapter 18 of the novel describes many of the abilities, limitations and weaknesses of vampires and Dracula in particular. Dracula has superhuman strength which, according to Van Helsing, is equivalent to that of 20 strong men. He does not cast a shadow or have a reflection from mirrors. He is immune to conventional means of attack; a sailor tries to stab him in the back with a knife, but the blade goes through his body as though it is air. He can defy gravity to a certain extent and possesses superhuman agility, able to climb vertical surfaces upside down in a reptilian manner. He can travel onto unhallowed ground, such as the graves of suicides and those of his victims. He has powerful hypnotic and telepathic abilities. He also has the ability to "within limitations" vanish and reappear elsewhere at will. If he knows the path, he can come out from anything or into anything regardless of how close it is bound or even if it is soldered shut.

Dracula has amassed cunning and wisdom throughout centuries and is unable to die of senescence. He can command animals such as rats, owls, bats, moths, foxes and wolves. His control is limited, as seen when the party first enters his house in London. He summons thousands of rats to swarm and attack the group and Holmwood summons his trio of terriers to battle them. The dogs prove very efficient rat killers. Terrified by their onslaught, the rats flee of their own volition.

Dracula can also manipulate the weather and, within his range, is able to direct the elements, such as storms, fog and mist.

==== Shapeshifting ====
Dracula can change form at will, able to grow and become small, his featured forms in the novel being that of a bat, a large wolf and a mist. When the moonlight is shining, he can travel as elemental dust within its rays. He is able to pass through tiny cracks or crevices while retaining his human form or in the form of a vapour; described by Van Helsing as the ability to slip through a hairbreadth space of a tomb door or coffin. This is also an ability used by his victim Lucy as a vampire. When the party breaks into her tomb, they open the sealed coffin to find her corpse is no longer located within.

==== Vampirism ====
One of Dracula's powers is the ability to turn others into vampires by biting them. According to Van Helsing:

When they become such, there comes with the change the curse of immortality; they cannot die, but must go on age after age adding new victims and multiplying the evils of the world. For all that die from the preying of the Undead become themselves Undead, and prey on their kind. And so the circle goes on ever widening, like as the ripples from a stone thrown in the water. Friend Arthur, if you had met that kiss which you know of before poor Lucy die, or again, last night when you open your arms to her, you would in time, when you had died, have become nosferatu, as they call it in Eastern Europe, and would for all time make more of those Un-Deads that so have filled us with horror.

— Dr. Seward's journal, Dracula, Chapter 16

The vampire bite itself does not cause death. It is the method vampires use to drain blood of the victim and to increase their influence over them. This is described by Van Helsing:

The nosferatu do not die like the bee when he sting once. He is only stronger, and being stronger, have yet more power to work evil.

— Dr. Seward's journal, Dracula, Chapter 18

Victims who are bitten by a vampire and do not die, are hypnotically influenced by them:

Those children whose blood she suck are not yet so much worse; but if she live on, Un-Dead, more and more lose their blood and by her power over them they come to her.

— Mina Harker's journal, Dracula, Chapter 18

Van Helsing later describes the aftermath of any bitten victims that are still alive when the vampire has been killed:

But if she die in truth, then all cease; the tiny wounds of the throats disappear, and they go back to their plays unknowing of whatever has been.

— Mina Harker's journal, Dracula, Chapter 18

As Dracula slowly drains Lucy's blood, she dies from acute blood loss and later transforms into a vampire, despite the efforts of Seward and Van Helsing to provide her with blood transfusions.

He is aided by powers of necromancy and divination of the dead, that all who die by his hand may reanimate and do his bidding.

==== Bloodletting ====
Dracula requires no other sustenance but fresh human blood, which has the effect of rejuvenating him and allowing him to grow younger. His power is drawn from the blood of others, and he cannot survive without it. Although drinking blood can rejuvenate his youth and strength, it does not give him the ability to regenerate; months after being struck on the head by a shovel, he still bears a scar from the impact.

Dracula's preferred victims are women. Harker states that he believes Dracula has a state of fasting as well as a state of feeding. He tells Mina exerting his abilities raises a desire to feed.

==== Vampire's Baptism of Blood ====
Count Dracula is depicted as the "King Vampire", and can control other vampires. To punish Mina and the party for their efforts against him, Dracula bites her on at least three occasions. He also forces her to drink his blood; this act curses her with the effects of vampirism and gives him a telepathic link to her thoughts. Hypnotism only works before dawn. Van Helsing refers to the act of drinking blood by both the vampire and the victim "the Vampire's Baptism of Blood".

you, their best beloved one, are now to me, flesh of my flesh, blood of my blood, kin of my kin, my bountiful wine-press for a while, and shall be later on my companion and my helper. You shall be avenged in turn, for not one of them but shall minister to your needs. But as yet you are to be punished for what you have done. You have aided in thwarting me. Now you shall come to my call. When my brain says 'Come!' to you, you shall cross land or sea to do my bidding.

The effects changes Mina physically and mentally over time. A few moments after Dracula attacks her, Van Helsing takes a wafer of sacramental bread and places it on her forehead to bless her; when the bread touches her skin, it burns her and leaves a scar on her forehead. She begins to lose her appetite, feeling repulsed by normal food, begins to sleep more and more during the day; cannot wake unless at sunset and stops writing in her diary. When Van Helsing later crumbles the same bread in a circle around her, she is unable to cross or leave the circle, discovering a new form of protection.

Dracula's death would release the curse on any still living victims. Van Helsing reveals that even were he to escape, his continued existence would ensure whether or not he victimized Mina further, she would become a vampire upon her eventual natural death.

==== Limitations of his powers ====
Dracula is much less powerful in daylight and is only able to shift his form at dawn, noon, and dusk (he can shift his form freely at night or if he is at his grave). The sun is not fatal to him, as sunlight does not burn and destroy him upon contact, though most of his abilities cease.

The sun that rose on our sorrow this morning guards us in its course. Until it sets to-night, that monster must retain whatever form he now has. He is confined within the limitations of his earthly envelope. He cannot melt into thin air nor disappear through cracks or chinks or crannies. If he goes through a doorway, he must open the door like a mortal.

— Jonathan Harker's journal, Dracula, Chapter 22

His power ceases, as does that of all evil things, at the coming of the day. Only at certain times can he have limited freedom. If he be not at the place whither he is bound, he can only change himself at noon or exact sunrise or sunset.

— Mina Harker's journal, Dracula, Chapter 18

Later interpretations of the character, and vampires in general, would amplify this trait into an outright fatal weakness, making it so that even the first rays of sunrise are capable of reducing a vampire to ash.

He is also limited in his ability to travel, as he can only cross running water at low or high tide. Owing to this, he is unable to fly across a river in the form of a bat or mist or even by himself board a boat or step off a boat onto a dock unless he is physically carried over with assistance. He is also unable to enter a place unless invited to do so by someone of the household, even a visitor; once invited, he can enter and leave the premises at will.

==== Weaknesses ====
There are items which afflict him to the point he has no power and can even calm him from his insatiable appetite for blood. He is repulsed by garlic, as well as sacred items and symbols such as crucifixes and sacramental bread.

...at the instant I saw that the cut had bled a little, and the blood was trickling over my chin. I laid down the razor, turning as I did so half round to look for some sticking plaster. When the Count saw my face, his eyes blazed with a sort of demoniac fury, and he suddenly made a grab at my throat. I drew away and his hand touched the string of beads which held the crucifix. It made an instant change in him, for the fury passed so quickly that I could hardly believe that it was ever there.

— Jonathan Harker's journal, Dracula, Chapter 2

Placing the branch of a wild rose upon the top of his coffin will render him unable to escape it; a sacred bullet fired into the coffin could kill him so that he remain true-dead.

Mountain-ash is also described as a form of protection from a vampire, although the effects are unknown.

==== Rest ====
Dracula is portrayed as being active in daylight at least once to pursue a victim. Dracula also purchases many properties throughout London 'over the counter' which shows that he does have the ability to have some type of presence in daylight. Harker describes Dracula's state of rest as neither death nor sleep:

on a pile of newly dug earth, lay the Count! He was either dead or asleep. I could not say which, for eyes were open and stony, but without the glassiness of death, and the cheeks had the warmth of life through all their pallor. The lips were as red as ever. But there was no sign of movement, no pulse, no breath, no beating of the heart. I bent over him, and tried to find any sign of life, but in vain... I thought he might have the keys on him, but when I went to search I saw the dead eyes, and in them dead though they were, such a look of hate, though unconscious of me or my presence, that I fled from the place, and leaving the Count's room by the window.

He requires Transylvanian soil to be nearby to him in a foreign land or to be entombed within his coffin within Transylvania in order to successfully rest; otherwise, he will be unable to recover his strength. This has forced him to transport many boxes of Transylvanian earth to each of his residences in London. He is most powerful when he is within his Earth-Home, Coffin-Home, Hell-Home, or any place unhallowed.

Further, if Dracula has had his fill in blood upon feeding, he will be sleep longer.

== Character development subsequent to the novel ==
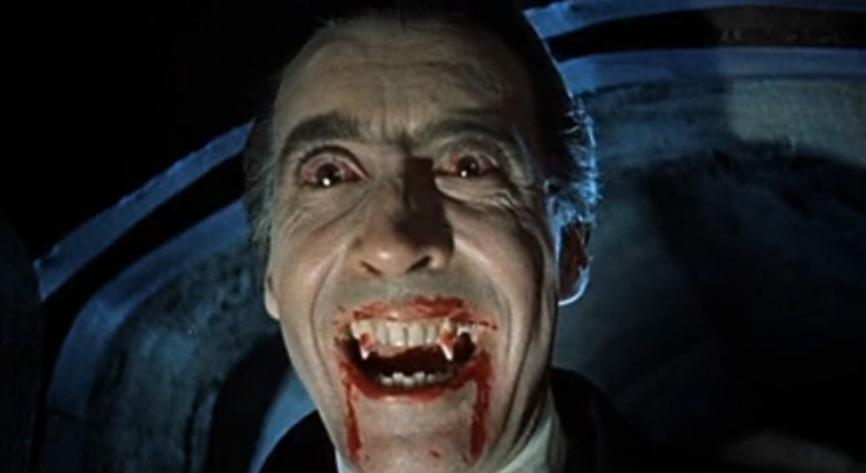
Christopher Lee starred as Dracula in numerous Hammer Horror films. Shown here is the 1958 film Dracula. Lee fixed the image of the vampire bearing dual elongated fangs in popular culture.

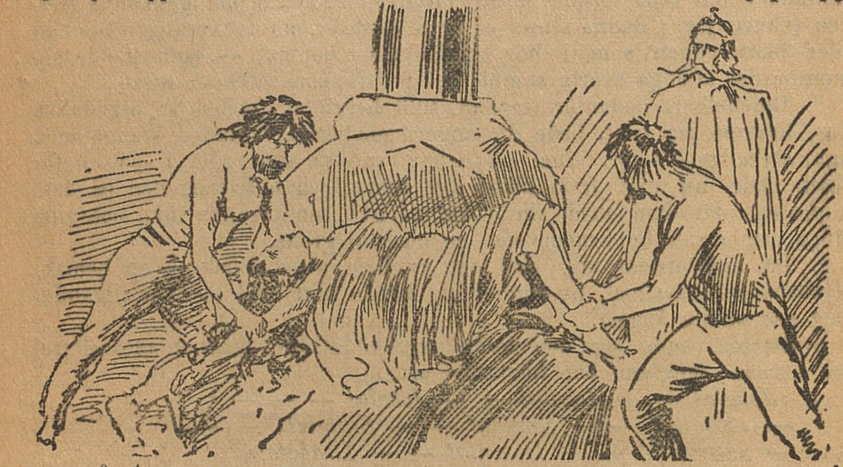
"Draculitz" in the Swedish derivative Powers of Darkness (Swedish: Mörkrets Makter) from 1899, illustrated by Emil Åberg (1864–1940). Åberg was probably the first to ever depict Dracula in a published work.

Dracula as seen in the first installment of the Hotel Transylvania franchise. This depiction of Dracula is considered one of the more well-known portrayals of the character in the 21st century, with the film series itself being a global hit.

The character of Count Dracula created by Stoker has become one of the best-known fictional figures of the Victorian era. Dracula has been portrayed by more actors in more visual media adaptations of the novel than any other horror character. Actors who have played him include Bela Lugosi, John Carradine, Lon Chaney Jr., Christopher Lee, Francis Lederer, Denholm Elliott, Jack Palance, Louis Jourdan, Rudolf Martin, Frank Langella, Klaus Kinski, Gary Oldman, Leslie Nielsen, George Hamilton, David Niven, Charles Macaulay, Keith-Lee Castle, Ray Liotta, Gerard Butler, Duncan Regehr, Richard Roxburgh, Marc Warren, Rutger Hauer, Stephen Billington, Dominic Purcell, Jonathan Rhys Meyers, Luke Evans, Claes Bang, Javier Botet and Bill Skarsgård. In 1922, Max Schreck starred as Count Orlok (an adaptation of Count Dracula) in Nosferatu. In 2003, Count Dracula, as portrayed by Lugosi in the 1931 film, was named as the 33rd greatest movie villain by the AFI. In 2013, Empire magazine ranked Lee's portrayal as Dracula the 7th Greatest Horror Movie Character of All Time.

The character is closely associated with the western cultural archetype of the vampire, and remains a popular Halloween costume.

- Count Dracula appears in Mad Monster Party? voiced by Allen Swift. This version is shown to be wearing a monocle. Count Dracula is among the monsters that Baron Boris von Frankenstein invites to the Isle of Evil to show off the secret of total destruction and announce his retirement from the Worldwide Organization of Monsters.
- Sesame Street character Count von Count is based on Bela Lugosi's interpretation of Count Dracula and Jack Davis' design for Dracula from Mad Monster Party?.
- Count Dracula appears in Mad Mad Mad Monsters (a "prequel of sorts" to Mad Monster Party?) voiced again by Allen Swift. He and his son are invited by Baron Henry von Frankenstein to attend the wedding of Frankenstein's monster and its mate at the Transylvania Astoria Hotel.
- Dracula is the primary antagonist of the Castlevania video game series and the first two seasons of the Castlevania animated Netflix series. He also appears as Gabriel Belmont, the main protagonist of the Lords of Shadow reboot video game series.
- Count Dracula appears in the Attack of the Killer Tomatoes episode "Spatula, Prinze of Dorkness", voiced by S. Scott Bullock. He relates a tale of how he once gave Dr. Putrid T. Gangreen a serum to transform tomatoes into vampire tomatoes. Though the doctor refused, Zoltan overheard their conversation and, mistaking the word serum for syrup, ingests the serum himself and renaming himself "Spatula, Prinze of Dorkness" who can turn people into vampires by kissing them in the neck (a stipulation that the Censor Lady put into place in fear of showing the biting and bloodshed associated with vampires on a Saturday morning cartoon). This spread to the other tomatoes and the entire town. When the Sun came up and disabled the vampires, Count Dracula in sunblock appears and deemed that the town is not worthy to be vampires. He then gives Chad Finletter the antidote to the vampirism and advises that the tomatoes be squashed immediately.
- Dracula appears as the lead character of Dracula the Un-dead, a novel by Stoker's great-grand nephew Dacre presented as a sequel to the original.
- In the Supernatural episode "Monster Movie", a shapeshifter that Sam and Dean Winchester fight considers his form of Count Dracula (portrayed by Todd Stashwick) his favorite form. It is in this form that Jamie killed him with Sam's gun loaded with silver bullets.
- Count Dracula, commonly referred to as "Drac", is the main character of the Hotel Transylvania franchise, voiced by Adam Sandler in the first three films and by YouTuber and impressionist Brian Hull, impersonating Sandler, in the fourth.
- Dracula, going by an inversion of his name, "Alucard", serves as the main character of the anime and manga series Hellsing and Hellsing Ultimate, where he serves Integra Hellsing, Abraham's great-granddaughter, as an anti-vampire warrior devoted to the British Crown.
- Dracula is the primary antagonist of the Showtime series Penny Dreadful, portrayed by Christian Camargo. This version of the character is the brother of Lucifer and, thus, a fallen angel.

== Modern and postmodern analyses of the character ==
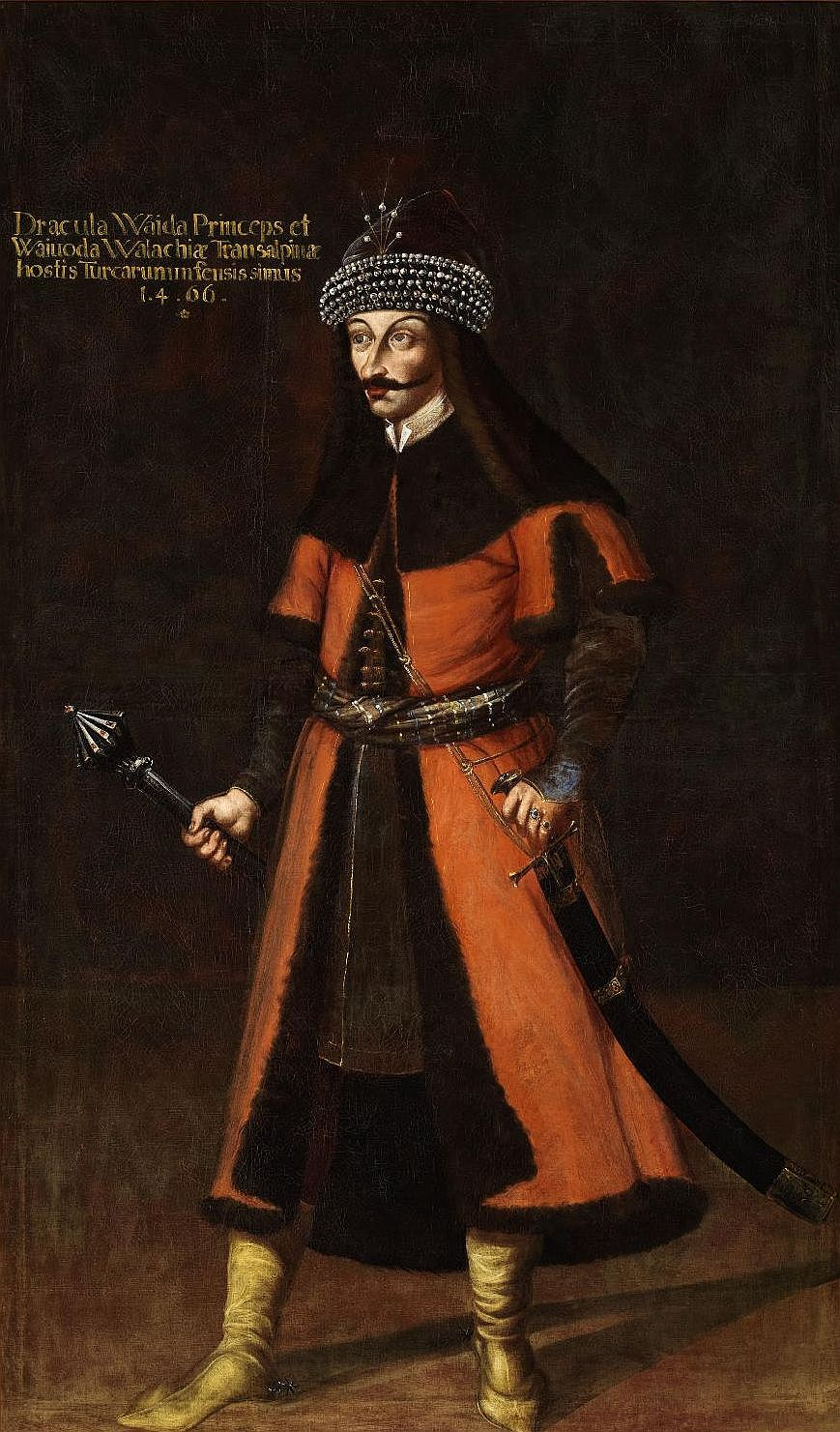
Full-size portrait of Vlad Țepeș in the "Gallery of the Ancestors" of the House of Esterházy, 17th century, Forchtenstein Castle

Already in 1958, Cecil Kirtly proposed that Count Dracula shared his personal past with the historical Transylvanian-born Voivode Vlad III Dracula of Wallachia, also known as Vlad the Impaler or Vlad Țepeș. Following the publication of In Search of Dracula by Radu Florescu and Raymond McNally in 1972, this supposed connection attracted much popular attention. This work argued that Bram Stoker based his Dracula on Vlad the Impaler.

Historically, the name "Dracula" is the family name of Vlad Țepeș' family, a name derived from a fraternal order of knights called the Order of the Dragon, founded by Sigismund of Luxembourg (king of Hungary and Bohemia, and Holy Roman Emperor) to uphold Christianity and defend the Empire against the Ottoman Turks. Vlad II Dracul, father of Vlad III, was admitted to the order around 1431 because of his bravery in fighting the Turks and was dubbed Dracul ("dragon" or "devil"), thus his son became Dracula ("of the dragon"). From 1431 onward, Vlad II wore the emblem of the order and later, as ruler of Wallachia, his coinage bore the dragon symbol.

Stoker came across the name Dracula in his reading on Romanian history, and chose this to replace the name (Count Wampyr) that he had originally intended to use for his villain. Some Dracula scholars, led by Elizabeth Miller, have questioned the depth of this connection as early as 1998. They argue that Stoker in fact knew little of the historic Vlad III, "Vlad the Impaler", and that he used only the name "Dracula" and some miscellaneous scraps of Romanian history. Also, there are no comments about Vlad III by name in the author's working notes.

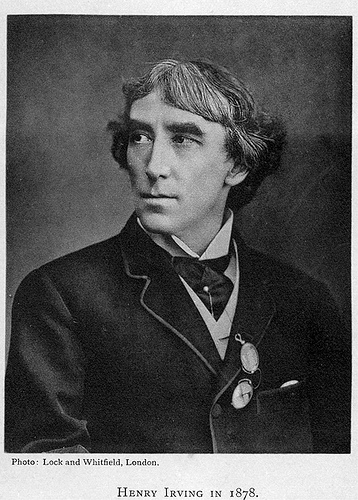
Shakespearean actor and friend of Stoker's Sir Henry Irving is widely considered to be a real-life inspiration for the character of Dracula.

Stoker was the personal assistant of actor Sir Henry Irving and the business manager of the West End's Lyceum Theatre, which Irving owned. Stoker saw Irving perform at the Lyceum, and Dracula's mesmeric qualities are seen as a dark, gothic caricature of Irving's charismatic on-stage persona, with the actor displaying a gloomy, chilling intensity and having a powerful hold over his audience. In 2002 historian Louis S. Warren writes:

There is virtual unanimity on the point that the figure of Dracula—which Stoker began to write notes for in 1890—was inspired by Henry Irving himself. … Stoker's numerous descriptions of Irving correspond so closely to his rendering of the fictional count that contemporaries commented on the resemblance. … But Bram Stoker also internalized the fear and animosity his employer inspired in him, making them the foundations of his gothic fiction.

While contemporaries remarked upon the character's similarity with Irving, Dracula scholar William Hughes specifically cites the influence of Irving's performance as Shylock in a Lyceum production of The Merchant of Venice.

While having a conversation with Jonathan Harker in Chapter 3, Dracula refers to his own background, and these speeches show elements which Stoker directly copied from An Account of the Principalities of Wallachia and Moldavia: With Various Political Observations Relating to Them by William Wilkinson. Stoker mentions the Voivode of the Dracula race who fought against the Turks after the defeat in the Battle of Kosovo, and was later betrayed by his brother, historical facts which unequivocally point to Vlad III, described as "Voïvode Dracula" by Wilkinson:

Who was it but one of my own race who as Voivode crossed the Danube and beat the Turk on his own ground? This was a Dracula indeed! Woe was it that his own unworthy brother, when he had fallen, sold his people to the Turk and brought the shame of slavery on them! Was it not this Dracula, indeed, who inspired that other of his race who in a later age again and again brought his forces over the great river into Turkey-land; who, when he was beaten back, came again, and again, though he had to come alone from the bloody field where his troops were being slaughtered, since he knew that he alone could ultimately triumph! (Chapter 3, pp. 19)

The Count's intended identity is later commented by Professor Van Helsing, referring to a letter from his friend Arminius:

He must, indeed, have been that Voivode Dracula who won his name against the Turk, over the great river on the very frontier of Turkey-land. (Chapter 18, pp. 145)

Corneel de Roos suggests that this encourages the reader to identify the Count with the Voivode Dracula first mentioned by him in Chapter 3, the one betrayed by his brother. Although Stoker does not mention any given names, his description, according to Corneel de Roos, points to Vlad III Dracula, betrayed by his brother Radu the Handsome, who had chosen the side of the Turks. But as noted by Corneel de Roos, in Chapter 25, Van Helsing and Mina drop this rudimentary connection to Vlad III and instead describe the Count's personal past as that of another of the Dracula line whom the Count had mentioned earlier to Jonathan, "that other of his race" who lived "in a later age", who had been inspired by the earlier Voivode Dracula and had also crossed the Danube river to fight the Turks. By smoothly exchanging Vlad III for a nameless double, Stoker avoided his main character being unambiguously linked to a historical person traceable in any history book.

Similarly, the novelist did not want to disclose the precise site of the Count's residence, Castle Dracula. As confirmed by Stoker's own handwritten research notes, the novelist had a specific location for the Castle in mind while writing the narrative: an empty mountain top in the Transylvanian Kelemen Alps near the former border with Moldavia. Efforts to promote the Poenari Castle (ca. 200 km away from the novel's place of action near the Borgo Pass) as the "real Castle Dracula" have no basis in Stoker's writing; although it bears much similarity to the fictional Castle Dracula, no written evidence shows Stoker to have heard of it. Regarding the Bran Castle near Brașov, Stoker possibly saw an illustration of Castle Bran (Törzburg) in Charles Boner's 1865 book on Transylvania, Transylvania: Its Products and Its People. Although Stoker may have been inspired by its romantic appearance, neither Boner, nor Mazuchelli nor Crosse (who also mention Terzburg or Törzburg) associate it with Vlad III; for the site of his fictitious Castle Dracula, Stoker preferred an empty mountain top.

Stoker's detailed notes reveal he was well aware of the ethnic differences and contrasting geo-political interest between the Wallachians (Romanians) and the Székelys, relatives of the Hungarians. Dracula states that the Székelys were descendants of the Huns and related to the Magyars (Hungarians), he claims the blood of Attila is in his veins. In the novel's original typewritten manuscript, the Count speaks of throwing off the "Austrian yoke", which corresponds with the perspective of the Székelys. This expression is crossed out and replaced by "Hungarian yoke" (as appearing in the published version), which matches the perspective of the Wallachians. Some take this to mean that Stoker opted for the Wallachian, not the Székely interpretation, thus lending more consistency to his Voivode Dracula. Although not identical to Vlad III, the vampire is portrayed as one of the "Dracula race".

In 2015, literary scholar Álvaro García Marín wrote that although Serbian and Eastern European revenants have been proposed as the origin of the literary vampire and Count Dracula, the Greek vrykolakas was a prior and likely more prominent source in the West during the sixteenth and seventeenth centuries. Early vampire fictions, including John William Polidori's The Vampyre (the first vampire novel and a precursor to Dracula), were inspired by the Greek vrykolakas and featured the vampire acting for the first time in Greece. Marín suggests that, if judged from the perspective of a Western European in 1730 or 1820, Dracula should have been a Greek, rather than Transylvanian. However, this Greek origin was later repressed and downplayed because Greece was already seen as one of Europe's cultural origins, and writers, instead, preferred to give the vampire a more distant "Eastern" origin rather than a Greek one.

== Portrayals ==
=== Film ===
Year	Title	Actor playing Dracula	Notes
1921	Dracula's Death	Erik Vanko	Lost film
1922	Nosferatu	Max Schreck	Renamed Count Orlok for legal reasons
1931	Dracula	Bela Lugosi	It had a notable influence on popular culture, and Hungarian actor Lugosi's portrayal of Dracula established the character as a cultural icon and the archetypal vampire in later works of fiction.
1931	Drácula	Carlos Villarías	Spanish version using the same sets as the Lugosi version, but with a different cast and crew.
1943	Son of Dracula	Lon Chaney Jr.	
1944	House of Frankenstein	John Carradine	
1945	House of Dracula	John Carradine	
1948	Abbott and Costello Meet Frankenstein	Bela Lugosi	
1953	Drakula İstanbul'da	Atıf Kaptan	
1958	Dracula	Christopher Lee	
1958	The Return of Dracula	Francis Lederer	
1964	Batman Dracula	Jack Smith	
1966	Dracula: Prince of Darkness	Christopher Lee	
1966	Billy the Kid vs Dracula	John Carradine	
1967	Mad Monster Party?	Allen Swift	Animated film
1967	Blood of Dracula's Castle	Alexander D'Arcy	
1968	Dracula Has Risen from the Grave	Christopher Lee	
1969	Las vampiras	John Carradine	
1969	The Magic Christian	Christopher Lee	
1970	Count Dracula	Christopher Lee	
1970	Taste the Blood of Dracula	Christopher Lee	
1970	One More Time	Christopher Lee	
1970	Scars of Dracula	Christopher Lee	
1970	Cuadecuc, vampir	Christopher Lee	
1970	Jonathan	Paul Albert Krumm	
1971	Dracula vs. Frankenstein	Zandor Vorkov	
1972	Blacula	Charles Macaulay	
1972	Dracula A.D. 1972	Christopher Lee	
1972	Count Dracula's Great Love	Paul Naschy	
1973	The Satanic Rites of Dracula	Christopher Lee	
1974	Blood for Dracula	Udo Kier	
1974	Legend of the 7 Golden Vampires	John Forbes-Robertson	
1974	Vampira	David Niven	Released in US as Old Dracula
1975	Lady Dracula	Stephen Boyd	Germany (theatrically released in 1977)
1976	Dracula and Son	Christopher Lee	
1977	Dracula's Dog	Michael Pataki	
1978	Doctor Dracula	John Carradine	
1979	Nosferatu the Vampyre	Klaus Kinski	Remake of Nosferatu (1922) with the novel's character names restored.
1979	Love at First Bite	George Hamilton	
1979	Nocturna	John Carradine	
1979	Dracula	Frank Langella	
1985	Fracchia Vs. Dracula	Edmund Purdom	
1987	The Monster Squad	Duncan Regehr	
1988	Waxwork	Miles O'Keeffe	
1992	Bram Stoker's Dracula	Gary Oldman	
1993	U.F.O.	Antony Georghiou	
1995	Monster Mash	Anthony Crivello	
1995	Dracula: Dead and Loving It	Leslie Nielsen	
1997	The Creeps	Phil Fondacaro	
1997	Hellsing	Kouta Hirano	
2000	Dracula 2000	Gerard Butler	
2002	Dracula: Pages from a Virgin's Diary	Zhang Wei-Qiang	
2002	Dracula	Patrick Bergin	
2004	Van Helsing	Richard Roxburgh	
2004	Blade: Trinity	Dominic Purcell	
2004	Dracula 3000	Langley Kirkwood	
2005	Dracula III: Legacy	Rutger Hauer	
2009	House of the Wolf Man	Michael R. Thomas	
2012	Dracula 3D	Thomas Kretschmann	
2012	Hotel Transylvania	Adam Sandler	Animated film
2013	Dracula 2012	Sudheer Sukumaran	Indian horror film
2013	Dear Dracula	Ray Liotta	Animated film
2013	Dracula: The Dark Prince	Luke Roberts	
2014	Dracula Untold	Luke Evans	
2015	Hotel Transylvania 2	Adam Sandler	Animated film
2017	Monster Family	Jason Isaacs	Animated film
2018	Hotel Transylvania 3: Summer Vacation	Adam Sandler	Animated film
2020	Dracula Sir	Anirban Bhattacharya	Indian Bengali-language film loosely based on the legend of the Dracula.
2021	Monster Pets	Brian Hull	Replacing and impersonating Adam Sandler.
2021	Monster Family 2: Nobody's Perfect	Jason Isaacs	Animated film
2022	Hotel Transylvania: Transformania	Brian Hull	Replacing and impersonating Adam Sandler.
2022	Dracula: The Original Living Vampire	Jake Herbert	
2022	The Invitation	Thomas Doherty	
2023	Renfield	Nicolas Cage	
2023	The Last Voyage of the Demeter	Javier Botet	
2024	Monster Mash	Ethan Daniel Corbett	
2024	Abigail	Matthew Goode (implied to be the real name of Kristoff Lazar)	
2024	Nosferatu	Bill Skarsgård	Second Remake of Nosferatu (1922) also renamed Count Orlok.
2025	Dracula	Caleb Landry Jones	

=== Radio and Audio Dramas ===
Year	Title	Actor playing Dracula	Notes
1938	Dracula	Orson Welles	episode of The Mercury Theatre on the Air
1981	Sherlock Holmes vs. Dracula	David March	broadcast on BBC Radio 4’s Saturday Night Theatre
2012	Dracula by Bram Stoker	Nicky Henson	broadcast on BBC Radio 4

=== Stage Plays ===
Year	Title	Actor playing Dracula	Notes
1927	Dracula	Bela Lugosi	Broadway
1977	Dracula	Frank Langella	Broadway
1977-1980	Dracula	Jeremy Brett	Touring production
1999	Dracula: A Chamber Musical	Juan Chioran	Stratford Shakespeare Festival
2001	Dracula, the Musical	Tom Hewitt	

=== Television and DTV Films ===
Year	Title	Actor playing Dracula	Notes
1972	Mad Mad Mad Monsters	Allen Swift	Animated film
1974	Bram Stoker's Dracula	Jack Palance	
1977	Count Dracula	Louis Jourdan	
1979	The Halloween That Almost Wasn't	Judd Hirsch	
1988	Scooby-Doo and the Ghoul School	Zale Kessler	Animated film
1988	Scooby-Doo! and the Reluctant Werewolf	Hamilton Camp	Animated film
2000	Dark Prince: The True Story of Dracula	Rudolf Martin	
2003	Dracula II: Ascension	Stephen Billington	
2005	The Batman vs. Dracula	Peter Stormare	Animated film
2006	Dracula	Marc Warren	
2008	The Librarian: Curse of the Judas Chalice	Bruce Davison	
2012	Dracula Reborn	Stuart Rigby	
2016	Welcome To Monster High	Michael Sorich	Animated film
2017	Escape from Mr. Lemoncello's Library	Alexander Mandra	
2017	Monster High: Electrified	Michael Sorich	Animated film
2022	Monster High: The Movie	Steve Valentine	
2023	Monster High 2	Steve Valentine	

=== Television Series ===
Year	Title	Actor playing Dracula	Notes
1968	Dracula	Denholm Elliott	Episode of UK TV series Mystery and Imagination
1971	Night Gallery	Francis Lederer	Episode: "The Devil Is Not Mocked"
1979	Cliffhangers	Michael Nouri	Episode: "The Curse of Dracula"
1989	The Super Mario Bros. Super Show	Jim Ward	Episode: "Bats in the Basement"
1989	Captain N: The Game Master	Garry Chalk	Animated TV series
1989	Superboy	Lloyd Bochner	Episode: "Young Dracula"
1990	Attack of the Killer Tomatoes	S. Scott Bullock	Episode: "Spatula, Prinze of Dorkness"
1990–1991	Dracula: The Series	Geordie Johnson	
1993	The Young Indiana Jones Chronicles	Bob Peck	Episode: "Transylvania, January 1918"
1994	Monster Force	Robert Bockstael	
2000	Buffy the Vampire Slayer	Rudolf Martin	Episode: "Buffy vs. Dracula"
2005	Dracula	Wins Dieus	Indian Malayalam-language television series on Asianet.
2005–2008	The Grim Adventures of Billy & Mandy	Phil LaMarr	Animated TV series
2006–2014	Young Dracula	Keith-Lee Castle	
2008	Supernatural	Todd Stashwick	Episode: "Monster Movie"
2008	Dracula	Wins Dieus	Indian Telugu-language television series on Gemini TV.
2012	Family Guy	Seth MacFarlane	Episode: "Livin' on a Prayer"
2012-2017	Teenage Mutant Ninja Turtles	Chris Sarandon	
2013	Dracula	Jonathan Rhys Meyers	
2016	Penny Dreadful	Christian Camargo	
2017–2018	Monster High: The Adventures of the Ghoul Squad	Michael Sorich	Animated TV series
2017–2020	Hotel Transylvania	David Berni; Ivan Sherry	Animated TV series
2017–2021	Castlevania	Graham McTavish	Animated TV series
2019	Van Helsing	Tricia Helfer	
2020	Dracula	Claes Bang	TV miniseries
2022	Monster High	Ken Marino	Animated TV series
2025	Motel Transylvania	TBA	Animated TV series

=== Video Games ===
Year	Title	Actor playing Dracula	Notes
1993	Bram Stoker's Dracula	Lee Carus-Wescott	
1997	Castlevania: Symphony of the Night	—N/a	
1997	Hollywood Monsters	Aparicio Rivero (Spanish) / Antonio Paiola (Italian)	Only available in Castilian Spanish and Italian
2003	Castlevania: Lament of Innocence	—N/a	
2004	Van Helsing	Richard Roxburgh	
2005	Castlevania: Curse of Darkness	Douglas Rye	
2006	Castlevania: Portrait of Ruin	Douglas Rye	
2007	Castlevania: The Dracula X Chronicles	Patrick Seitz	
2008	Dracula: Origin	Kevin Delaney	
2008	Castlevania: Order of Ecclesia	Patrick Seitz	
2008	Castlevania Judgment	Patrick Seitz	
2009	Castlevania: The Arcade	—N/a	
2009	Castlevania: The Adventure ReBirth	—N/a	
2010	Castlevania: Harmony of Despair	Patrick Seitz	
2010	Castlevania: Lords of Shadow	Robert Carlyle	
2013	Castlevania: Lords of Shadow – Mirror of Fate	Robert Carlyle	
2014	Castlevania: Lords of Shadow 2	Robert Carlyle	
2018	Hotel Transylvania 3: Monsters Overboard	Brock Powell	
2019	Castlevania: Grimoire of Souls	Jack Merluzzi	
2019	Castlevania: Grimoire of Souls	Vinay Murthy	
2022	Hotel Transylvania: Scary-Tale Adventures	Brian Hull	
2023	Renfield: Bring Your Own Blood	—N/a	

=== Attractions ===
Year	Title	Actor playing Dracula	Notes
2025	Monsters Unchained: The Frankenstein Experiment	Mateus Ward	

== See also ==
- Elizabeth Báthory
- Carmilla
- Clinical vampirism
- List of fictional vampires
- List of horror film antagonists
- Dracula (Castlevania)
