= Castle Dracula =

Fictional castle in Bram Stoker's novel

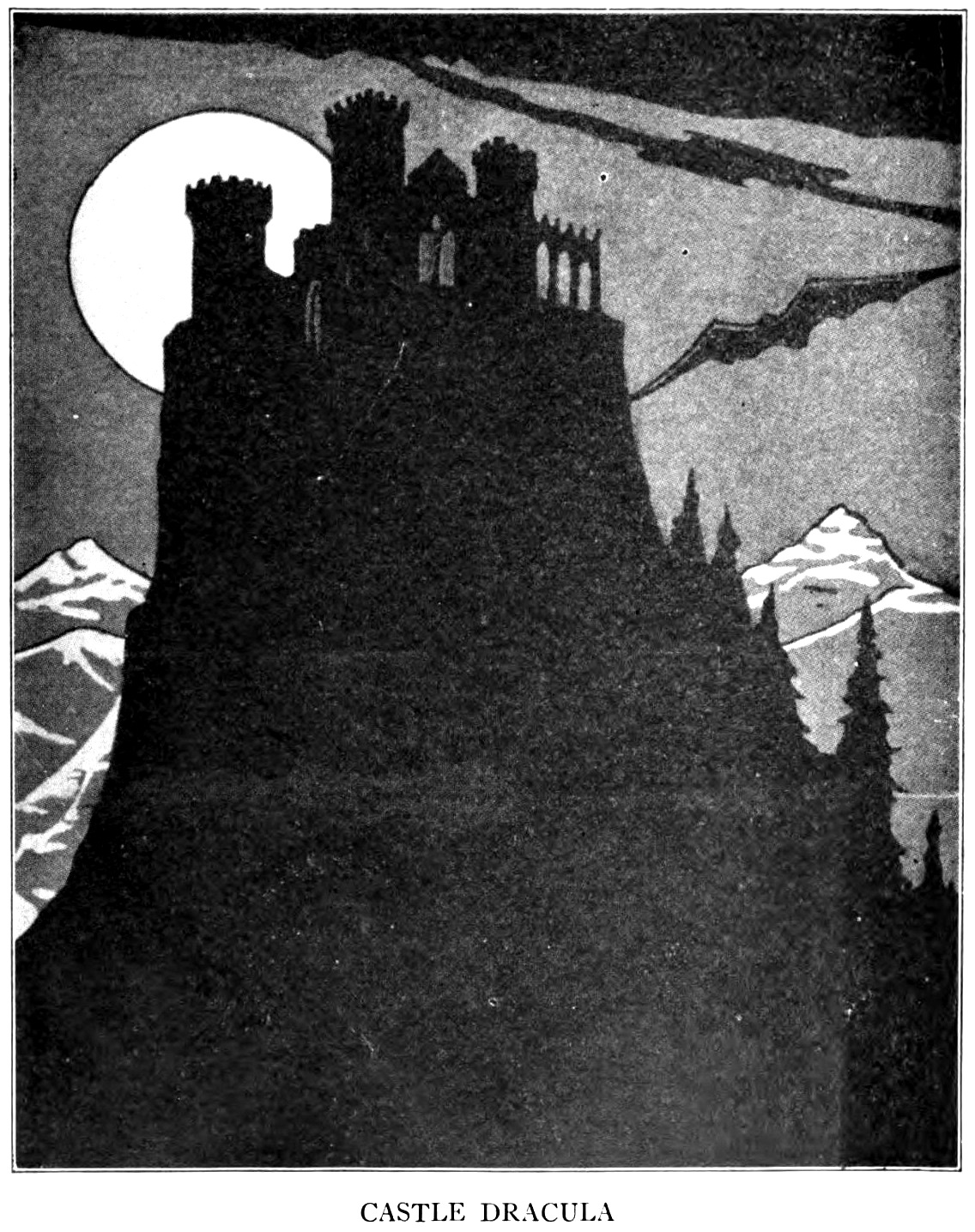
Illustration from a 1910 edition of the novel

Castle Dracula (also known as Dracula’s castle) is the fictitious Transylvanian residence of Count Dracula, the vampire antagonist in Bram Stoker's 1897 horror novel Dracula. It is the setting of the first few and final scenes of the novel.

== Events in the novel taking place in or near the castle ==
In the novel's first chapters, the young English solicitor Jonathan Harker, traveling from London via Paris, Munich, Vienna, Budapest, Klausenburg, and Bistritz, arrives at the castle after being picked up in the Borgo Pass by a mysterious driver, whom Harker later recognizes as his host, Count Dracula, himself. During the trip, he apparently falls asleep but wakes up when the calèche reaches the stronghold. The driver disappears and Harker thinks himself lost until the door opens and the Count bids him welcome.

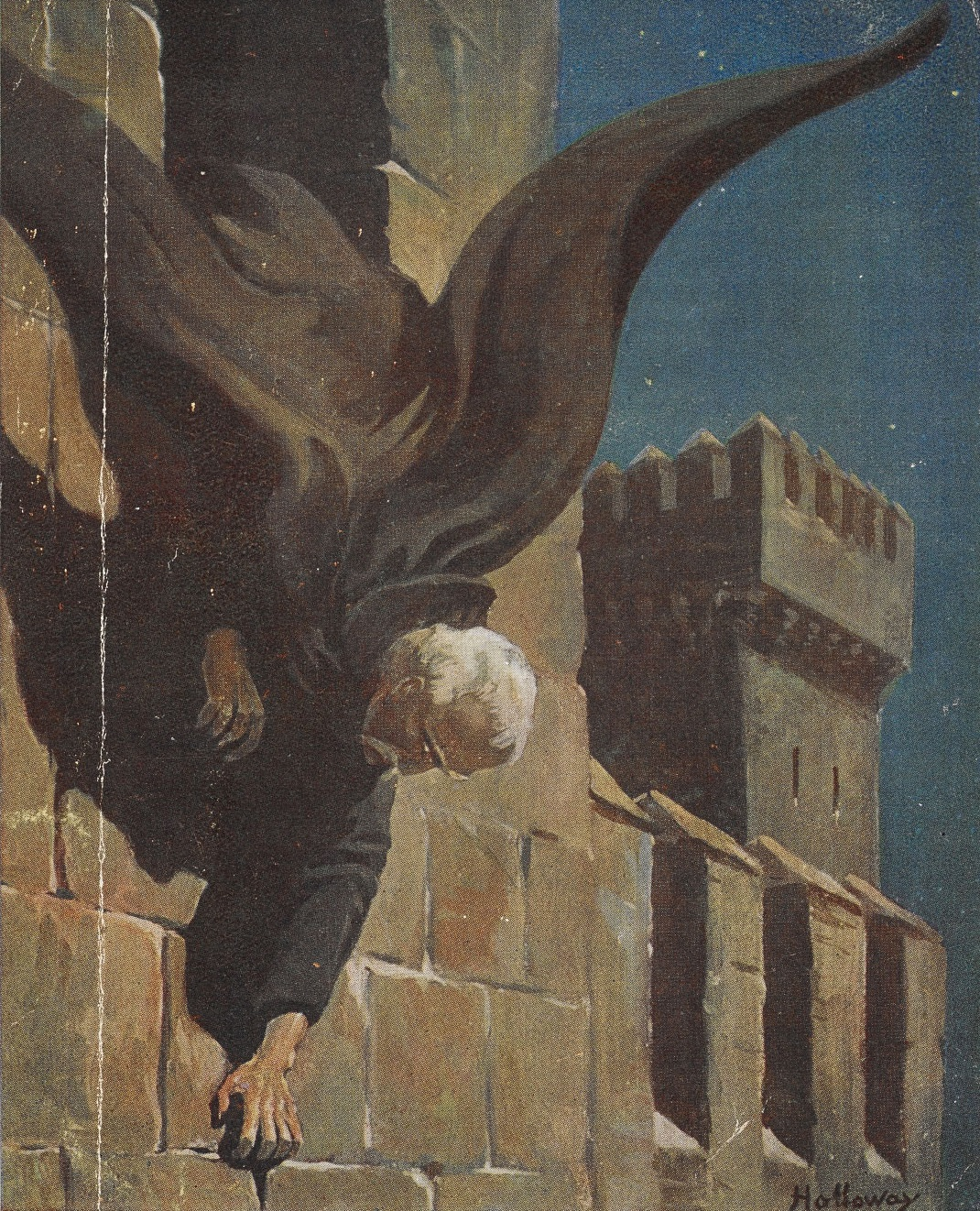
Count Dracula climbing down the wall of his castle, book cover 1919

After some meals, which Harker always takes alone, and various conversations about the Carfax property near Purfleet, which his host wishes to purchase, Harker discovers that his patron has some disturbing habits, like climbing down the walls of the building like a lizard. Harker finds himself a prisoner in the castle.

One night, when he falls asleep in a forbidden room, he is harassed by the three Brides of Dracula, who are interrupted by a furious Count, claiming the guest for himself. Apart from the scene with the female vampires, however, who provokes a strange desire in him to be kissed by those red lips, Harker is not attacked in any way. The Count induces him to stay for a much longer time than planned and write some letters home to appease his employer and his fiancée Mina Murray. Harker scales the walls of the castle himself, enters the Count's empty room, and discovers a crypt in the chapel, wherein fifty boxes with earth are stored; in one of them, he finds the Count, who has just fed on blood. Harker tries to hit him with a shovel, but the blow is diverted by the Count's hypnotic powers. In this box, the Count is later transported to be shipped to England. Harker remains in the castle with the seductive female vampires but finally manages to escape to Budapest, where he is taken care of by Sister Agatha.

All events are recorded in Harker's journal, which later serves his friends as a report about the vampire and as a travel guide. After Lucy Westenra, Mina Murray's old school friend has died from a mysterious illness, Professor Abraham Van Helsing visits Mina and reads the diary, which he confirms to be a realistic account of the unbelievable circumstances Jonathan was confronted with.

In the final chapters, the vampire hunters chase the Count, who returns to his homeland by ship. Dracula tricks them by directing the vessel to Galatz, while Van Helsing and his friends are waiting for the Czarina Catherine to show up in Varna. In Galatz, the party splits into three couplings: Van Helsing and Mina travel by train to Veresți near Suceava and continue with a purchased horse carriage over Bukovinian territory to the east end of the Borgo Pass; Jonathan Harker and Arthur Holmwood buy a steam launch to follow the Count's box, transported by Slovak boatmen via the Sereth and the Bistrița River, while Dr. John Seward and Quincey Morris head in the same direction by horse. The box with the Count is taken over from the Slovaks by Szgany (Gypsies), who transport it by leiter wagon. The routes of the Szgany and the three couplings finally converge at a place in the immediate neighborhood of the castle, where Van Helsing and his men force the convoy to stop. Harker manages to decapitate the vampire with his Kukri knife, while Morris plunges his Bowie knife into the heart.

The only person to actually enter the castle during this episode is Van Helsing, who leaves the night camp shared with Mina to do away with the Brides of Dracula. Mina is already affected by her "blood wedding" with the vampire and left within a circle of Holy Bread.

In a final note, written seven years after their dramatic adventures, Harker reports on the group's return to Transylvania:

The castle stood as before, reared high above a waste of desolation. (Chapter 27, Jonathan Harker's Final Note)

Three paragraphs from the original manuscript, in which the building itself is swallowed by a volcanic cataclysm, do not appear in the printed version. Possible reasons mentioned are that Stoker wanted to leave the option of a sequel open, or that this dramatic finale reminded too much of Edgar Allan Poe's "The Fall of the House of Usher":

As we looked there came a terrible convulsion of the earth so that we seemed to rock to and fro and fell to our knees. At the same moment with a roar which seemed to shake the very heavens the whole castle and the rock and even the hill on which it stood seemed to rise into the air and scatter in fragments while a mighty cloud of black and yellow smoke volume on volume in rolling grandeur was shot upwards with inconceivable rapidity.

Then there was a stillness in nature as the echoes of that thunderous report seemed to come as with the hollow boom of a thunder-clap – the long reverberating roll which seems as though the floors of heaven shook. Then down in a mighty ruin falling whence they rose came the fragments that had been tossed skywards in the cataclysm.

From where we stood it seemed as though the one fierce volcano burst had satisfied the need of nature and that the castle and the structure of the hill had sunk again into the void. We were so appalled with the suddenness and the grandeur that we forgot to think of ourselves.

In his annotated Dracula edition, Leslie Klinger suggests as part of his conceit in considering Dracula a collection of true documents that these lines were part of Count Dracula's efforts to "cover up" the truth about the vampire's continuing activities, but that Stoker sabotaged the Count's editorial intervention by deleting these lines.

== Physical characteristics and lay-out ==
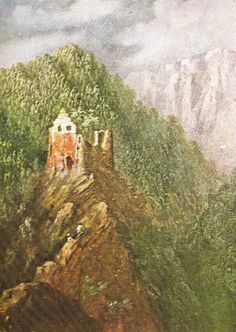
Poenari Castle (Trenk, 1860), a stronghold of Vlad Țepeș resembling the novel's descriptions of Castle Dracula.

The first description is given by Jonathan Harker when the calèche reaches the courtyard of the castle:

We kept on ascending, with occasional periods of quick descent, but in the main always ascending. Suddenly, I became conscious of the fact that the driver was in the act of pulling up the horses in the courtyard of a vast ruined castle, from whose tall black windows came no ray of light, and whose broken battlements showed a jagged line against the sky. (Chapter 1, last paragraph)

The ruined state of the castle is confirmed by the Count's words:

Moreover, the walls of my castle are broken. The shadows are many, and the wind breathes cold through the broken battlements and casements. (Chapter 2, Jonathan Harker's Journal, Entry for 7 May)

The interior decoration, on the other hand, is still in good shape and the library is well equipped:

The table service is of gold, and so beautifully wrought that it must be of immense value. The curtains and upholstery of the chairs and sofas and the hangings of my bed are of the costliest and most beautiful fabrics and must have been of fabulous value when they were made, for they are centuries old, though in excellent order. (Chapter 2, Jonathan Harker's Journal, Entry for 7 May)

Harker's window opens into the courtyard, but soon he sets out for a little expedition:

After breakfast, I did a little exploring in the castle. I went out on the stairs and found a room looking towards the South. The view was magnificent, and from where I stood there was every opportunity of seeing it. The castle is on the very edge of a terrific precipice. A stone falling from the window would fall a thousand feet without touching anything! As far as the eye can reach is a sea of green tree tops, with occasionally a deep rift where there is a chasm. Here and there are silver threads where the rivers wind in deep gorges through the forests. (Chapter 2, Jonathan Harker's Journal, Entry for 8 May)

All other doors are locked, however. The Count warns him not to sleep outside the rooms he already knows, including the library and the dining room; it seems as if the castle has a life of its own:

Let me advise you, my dear young friend. Nay, let me warn you with all seriousness, that should you leave these rooms you will not by any chance go to sleep in any other part of the castle. It is old and has many memories, and there are bad dreams for those who sleep unwisely. Be warned! (Chapter 3, Jonathan Harker's Journal, Entry for 12 May)

When Harker finds another open door, though, he ignores this warning and falls asleep in the forbidden chambers:

I was now in a wing of the castle further to the right than the rooms I knew and a story lower down. From the windows I could see that the suite of rooms lay along to the south of the castle, the windows of the end room looking out both west and south. On the latter side, as well as to the former, there was a great precipice. The castle was built on the corner of a great rock so that on three sides it was quite impregnable, and great windows were placed here where sling, or bow, or culverin could not reach, and consequently, light and comfort, impossible to a position which had to be guarded, were secured. To the west was a great valley, and then, rising far away, great jagged mountain fastnesses, rising peak on peak, the sheer rock studded with mountain ash and thorn, whose roots clung in cracks and crevices and crannies of the stone. This was evidently the portion of the castle occupied by the ladies in bygone days, for the furniture had more an air of comfort than any I had seen. (Chapter 3, Jonathan Harker's Journal, Entry for 16 May, morning)

In this room, indeed, the ladies of the castle pay him their tantalizing visit. The Count's room is also one story below Harker's own room; from there, a circular staircase and a tunnel leading to the chapel with the boxes:

I descended, minding carefully where I went for the stairs were dark, being only lit by loopholes in the heavy masonry. At the bottom, there was a dark, tunnel-like passage, through which came a deathly, sickly odor, the odor of old earth newly turned. As I went through the passage the smell grew closer and heavier. At last, I pulled open a heavy door which stood ajar and found myself in an old ruined chapel, which had evidently been used as a graveyard. The roof was broken, and in two places were steps leading to vaults, but the ground had recently been dug over, and the earth placed in great wooden boxes, manifestly those which had been brought by the Slovaks. (Chapter 4, Jonathan Harker's Journal, Entry for 25 June, continued)

When Van Helsing comes to Castle Dracula, he goes directly to the ruined chapel and finds Dracula's "brides" in three of the tombs there, as well as Dracula's own tomb, which is empty.

[She] lay in a tomb fretted with age and heavy with the dust of centuries, though there be that horrid odor such as the lairs of the Count have had...Then I braced myself again to my horrid task and found by wrenching away tomb-tops one other of the sisters, the other dark one. I dared not pause to look on her as I had on her sister, lest once more I should begin to be enthralled; but I go on searching until, presently, I find in a high great tomb as if made to one much beloved that other fair sister...There was one great tomb more lordly than all the rest; huge it was, and nobly proportioned. On it was but one-word DRACULA. (Chapter 27, Dr. Van Helsing’s Memorandum, an afternoon of 5 November.)

== Location ==
The site of Dracula's home is only described vaguely by Stoker. The route descriptions hardly mention any recognizable landmarks, but focus on evocations of a wild and snow-covered landscape, haunted by howling wolves and lit by supernatural blue flames at night. Because of this conspicuous vagueness, the annotated Dracula editions by Leonard Wolf, Clive Leatherdale and Leslie Klinger simply assume Bram Stoker had no specific location in mind and place the castle in or immediately next to the Borgo Pass. As a consequence, these editions take for granted that the Count's men, pursued by Harker, Holmwood, Morris, and Seward, follow the Bistrița River all the way up to Vatra Dornei and then travel the route through the Borgo Pass already taken by Van Helsing and Mina. The same view is adopted by Andrew Connell in his Google Map mark-ups. These theories ignore or misinterpret Stoker's hint that around the 47th Parallel, the Count's men are supposed to leave the river and cross-over to Transylvanian territory:

We took it, that somewhere about the 47th degree, north latitude, would be the place chosen for crossing the country between the river and the Carpathians. (Chapter 26, Jonathan Harker's Journal, Entry for 30 October)

The author Hans Corneel de Roos has theorized the site Stoker had in mind while shaping his narrative was an empty mountaintop in the Transylvanian Călimani Mountains near the former border with Moldavia, about 20 miles southeast of the Borgo Pass.

== Sources of inspiration ==
Bram Stoker's hand-written notes for Dracula identify a setting for a castle early on (about 1890). At this stage, no specific castle had been identified as inspiration. Having taken Transylvania as the location for Castle Dracula, it's possible that he copied information about a castle at Vécs from one of his sources on Transylvania, the book by Major E.C. Johnson.

Castle at Törzburg, ill. from Charles Boner

A further option is that Stoker saw an illustration of Castle Bran (Törzburg) in the book on Transylvania by Charles Boner, or read about it in the books by Mazuchelli or Crosse.

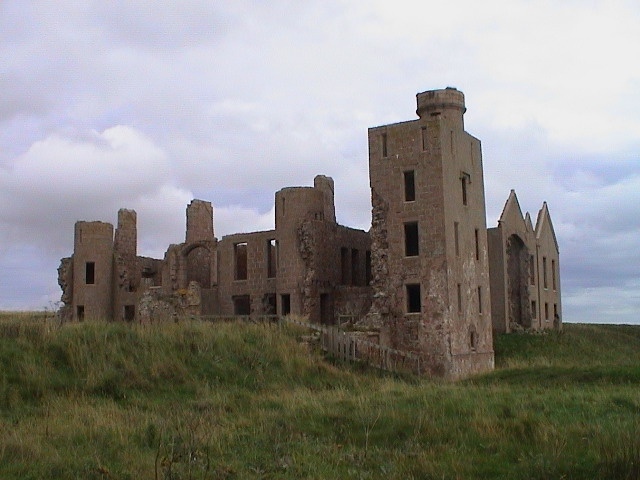
New Slains Castle in Aberdeenshire, a place Stoker often visited.

In 1893 Bram Stoker discovered Cruden Bay in Aberdeenshire in Scotland, which became the regular spot for his monthly summer holiday, largely devoted to writing. Parts, if not most, of Dracula were written there. Nearby Slains Castle appears to have inspired part of the floor plan for Castle Dracula, in particular the octagonal room: "The Count halted, putting down my bags, closed the door, and crossing the room, opened another door which led into a small octagonal room lit by a single lamp, and seemingly without a window of any sort." Compare this with the description of Slains Castle from a 1922 sales document: "On the Principle Floor: Entrance Hall (heated with stove) leading to Central Octagonal Interior Hall (heated with stove and lighted from above)."

Although the historical Poenari Castle built under Vlad Țepeș is not mentioned in any of Stoker's research notes, Sir Christopher Lee notes in the documentary film In Search of Dracula (1974) the resemblance between it and the fictional Castle Dracula: "Bram Stoker did not know that a real Castle Dracula existed. But his description of the castle in the Borgo Pass is uncannily apt. The real Castle Dracula is perched on top of a rock 1,000 feet above the Argeș River in Wallachia."

== Tourist attraction ==
Since 1997, Bran Castle near Brașov has been marketed as "Dracula's Castle". However, Bran Castle is not mentioned in the book Dracula. The website promoting Bran Castle claims it was one of Vlad the Impaler's temporary residences. Since Van Helsing and Mina in Chapter 25 do not identify Count Dracula as the historical Vlad III Dracula (Vlad Țepeş or Vlad the Impaler) but as a nameless "other of [the Dracula] race", living "in a later age", this claim does not support the identification of Stoker's fictitious building with the Bran Castle.

For the same reason, Poenari Castle in Argeș County does not qualify as the "real" Dracula Castle; Stoker never heard of Poenari Castle. Both Bran Castle and the Poenari Castle are more than 100 miles away from the site Stoker actually selected and took down in a cryptic handwritten note. A hotel called Castel Dracula, located in Piâtra Fântânele in the Borgo Pass, which promotes itself as being constructed at the place of Stoker's fictional castle, at least is located at the point where Harker left the post carriage from Bistritz to Bukovina to be picked up by the Count; their route must have led over the former watchpost of Dornișoara towards the Călimani Mountains peaks in the south-east.

== In popular culture ==
In addition to the many adaptations of Dracula in film, and other films featuring the character, there are video games called Dracula's Castle, Escape Dracula's Castle, Restore Dracula's Castle, and Demon Castle Dracula (Akumajō Dracula), known in the west as Castlevania.

== Bibliography ==
- Boner, Charles. Transylvania: Its Product and Its People. London: Longmans, 1865
- Crișan, Marius Mircea The Models for Castle Dracula in Stoker’s Sources on Transylvania, Journal of Dracula Studies Nr. 10 (2008)
- Crosse, Andrew F. Round About the Carpathians. Edinburgh and London: Blackwood, 1878
- De Roos, Hans Corneel. The Ultimate Dracula, Moonlake Editions, Munich, 2012, ISBN 978-3-943559-00-2
- Eighteen-Bisang, Robert and Miller, Elizabeth. Bram Stoker's Notes for Dracula: A Facsimile Edition Toronto: McFarland, 2008, ISBN 978-0-7864-3410-7
- Leatherdale, Clive.Dracula Unearthed, Westcliff-on-Sea, UK: Desert Island Books, 1998
- [ Mazuchelli, Nina Elizabeth] A Fellow of the Carpathian Society. Magyarland: Being the Narrative of Out Travels Through the Highlands and Lowlands of Hungary. 2 vol. London: Sampson Low, Marston, Searle, and Rivington, 1881
- Johnson, Major E.C. On the Track of the Crescent: Erratic Notes from the Piraeus to Pesth. London: Hurst and Blackett, 1885
- Miller, Elizabeth. Dracula: Sense & Nonsense. 2nd ed. Westcliff-on-Sea, UK: Desert Island Books, 2006. ISBN 1-905328-15-X
- Shepherd, Mike. When Brave Men Shudder: the Scottish origins of Dracula. Wild Wolf Publishing, 2018.
- Stoker, Bram. Dracula – A Mystery Story. London-Westminster: Arch. Constable & Sons, 1897
- Wolf, Leonard. The Essential Dracula, New York: Clarkson N. Potter, 1975, followed by The Essential Dracula: The Definitive Annotated Edition, Penguin, 1993
- Klinger, Leslie S. The New Annotated Dracula. W.W. Norton & Co., 2008. ISBN 0-393-06450-6
