= Easter Massacre of the Boyars (1459) =

Massacre during the Greco-Turkish war

The Easter Massacre of the Boyars
- Location: Wallachia, Târgoviște
- Date: 1459
- Target: Boyars
- Attack type: Massacre, Impalement
- Deaths: 300
- Perpetrator: Wallachian army under Vlad the Impaler

The Easter Massacre of the Boyars was an event in which Vlad the Impaler invited the Boyars of Târgoviște to an Easter feast in 1459 before ordering their arrest for conspiring against his family. Many were executed or impaled, while others were forced into labor at Poenari Castle. The massacre became one of the most infamous events of Vlad the Impaler's reign.

== Background ==
During the mid-15th century, the Principality of Wallachia was marked by constant political instability and conflicts between rival noble families. Power struggles among the Boyars often weakened central authority and contributed to repeat changes of rulers. Vlad the Impaler sought to strengthen his control by eliminating opposition within the nobility, especially those he believed were responsible for past betrayals and the death of his father and brother.
