= Dracula's Castle =

Dracula's Castle may refer to:

- The fictional Castle Dracula in Bram Stoker's novel Dracula
- Bran Castle, a tourist attraction in Romania
- Poenari Castle, a castle of Vlad III Dracula
- Corvin Castle, a castle which was Vlad III Dracula's prison
- Orava Castle, a location where Nosferatu was filmed
- "Castle Dracula", a song by Priestess from certain editions of the album Prior to the Fire
- "Dracula's Castle", a song by New Order from their album Waiting for the Sirens' Call
- The titular castle in the video game series Castlevania
