= Charles Boner =

English writer and poet (1815–1870)

Charles Boner (1815–1870) was an English travel writer, poet and translator.

== Life ==
He was the second child and only son of Charles Boner, of Bath, Somerset, who died at Twickenham, 14 Aug. 1833, and was born at Weston, near Bath, 29 April 1815. He was educated at Bath from 1825 to 1827, and then at Tiverton grammar school from 1827 to 1829. From 1831 to 1837 he was tutor to the two elder sons of John Constable the painter.

After his mother's death in 1839, Boner accepted an invitation from August, Freiherr von Dörnberg to reside with him in Germany. Some time later, having learned German, he accompanied the baron to Regensburg, where he had the offer of a post in the family of Maximilian Karl, 6th Prince of Thurn and Taxis. Boner became a lifelong friend of the prince, mixed in society, and spent twenty years in the family household at Regensburg. He visited William Wordsworth at Grasmere in 1844; and in 1845 he made the acquaintance of Mary Russell Mitford, with whom he carried on a literary correspondence for ten years.

In 1860 Boner left Regensburg and made Munich his home. His daughter Marie was married, 27 February 1865, to Theodor Horschelt the painter. As special correspondent of The Daily News, he went to Vienna in August 1865, his time with the paper lasting from the time when the treaty of commerce between England and Austria was arranged until the conclusion of the Seven Weeks' War. In 1867 Boner went to Salzburg to be present at the meeting of Napoleon III and Franz Joseph I of Austria, and wrote a description of the scene. He also visited Trieste, where he attended the funeral of Maximilian I of Mexico. He died in the house of his son-in-law Horschelt, 5 Louisenstrasse, Munich, 9 April 1870.

== Works ==
Boner published:

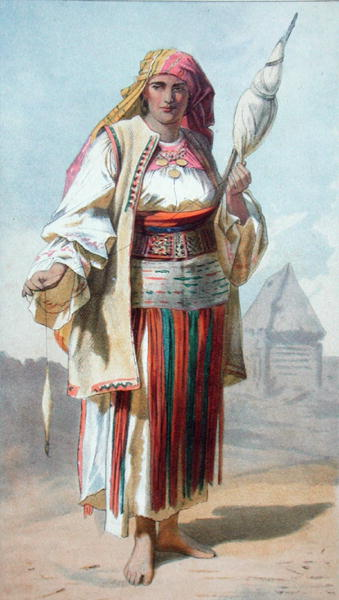
A Wallack Woman from Transylvania, its Products and People (1865) by Charles Boner

- C. Boner's Book for those who are young, and those who love what is natural and truthful, 1848
- Chamois Hunting, 1853, new edition 1860
- H. Masius's Studies from Nature, 1855
- Cain, 1855
- The New Dance of Death and other Poems, 1857
- Verses, 1858
- Forest Creatures, 1861
- Transylvania, its Products and People, 1865
- Guide for Travellers in the Plain and on the Mountain, 1866;
- Siebenbürgen. Land und Leute, 1868.

Most of Boner's poems are dated from Sankt Emmeran. His translations from the German included Hans Christian Andersen's A Danish Story Book (1846), illustrated by Count Franz Pocci, and The Dream of Little Tuck (1848). The Andersen translations included The Princess and the Pea, and followed the German version of 1839 by Georg Friedrich von Jenssen (as did Caroline Peachey at the same period), multiplying the single pea to three.

After a London visit in 1844, Boner contributed to the Literary Gazette a series of articles on German poets. He also wrote for the New York Tribune and other papers, and compiled a memoir of Maximilian I of Mexico.
