= Elizabeth Sarah Mazuchelli =

English traveller and travel writer (1832–1914)

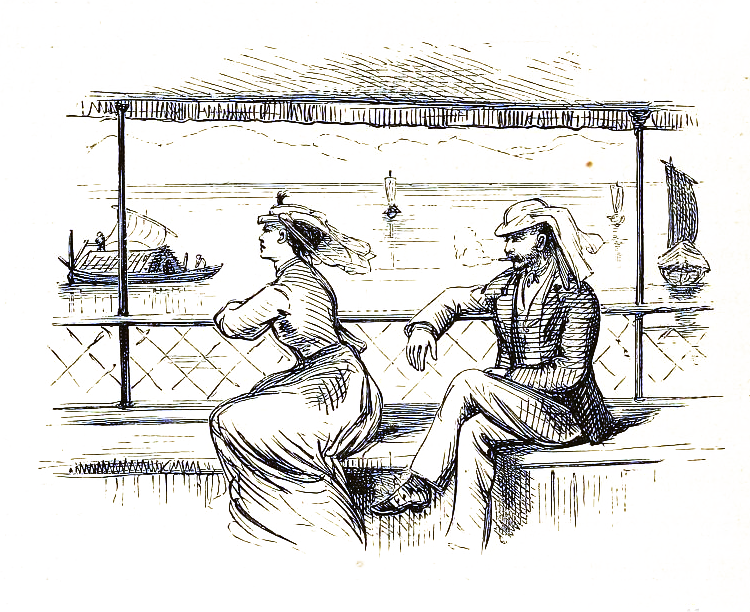
Drawing by Mazuchelli depicting herself with her husband on a steamer in the Ganga river

Elizabeth "Nina" Sarah Mazuchelli (29 January 1832 – 14 February 1914) was an English traveller and travel writer. She published The Indian Alps and How We Crossed Them in 1876, an account of a two-month expedition into the Himalayas.

Mazuchelli is the subject of a chapter of Sara Mills's book Discourses of Difference: An Analysis of Women's Travel Writing and Colonialism. Mills points out that Mazuchelli does not fit the "conventional vision of the eccentric British spinster traveller figure" and "is, in many ways, the embodiment of the Victorian discourses of femininity".

== Personal life ==
Mazuchelli was born in 1832. Her birth surname may have been Harris. She married Francis Mazuchelli (born 1820 or 1821) in 1853 in Geneva. He was born in Milan, emigrated to the United States, and was ordained in the Roman Catholic church before becoming an Anglican clergyman. Francis joined the army as a chaplain in 1857 and in 1858 the couple travelled to India for him to take up the position of Assistant Chaplain in H.M. Indian Service in Calcutta. In 1869 he was posted to Darjeeling, to which Nina reacted with joy, writing of "Emancipation from the depleting influences of heat almost unbearable, for the bracing and life-giving breezes which blow over regions of eternal ice and snow". It was from Darjeeling that they made the expedition across the Singalila Ridge about which she wrote her The Indian Alps and How We Crossed Them.

The couple returned to England in 1875 and Francis became curate of Wrington in Somerset. They travelled to the Tatra and Carpathian Mountains, after which she wrote her second book, Magyarland. He became Vicar of Felmersham in 1869 and on his retirement in 1895 they moved to Nantgaredig in Wales, where Nina died in 1914, Francis having died in 1901. Their grave is in Church of Holy Trinity, Burrington churchyard, and Nina left £1,000 in her will for charitable purposes in Burrington and the upkeep of their gravestone.

== Travels in India ==
Luree Miller's 1984 book On Top of the World: Five Women Explorers in Tibet gives a detailed account of Mazuchelli's two-month expedition into the mountains.

She is said to have been the first western woman to see Mount Everest, in 1869, and described it as "the dream of my childhood to see this nearest point of Heaven and Earth".

== Publications ==
- The Indian Alps and how we crossed them, being a narrative of two years' residence in the Eastern Himalaya and two months' tour into the interior. By a Lady Pioneer [E. S. Mazuchelli]. Illustrated by herself. London. 1876.
- "Magyarland;" being the narrative of our travels through the highlands and lowlands of Hungary. By a Fellow of the Carpathian Society, author of "The Indian Alps" E. S. Mazuchelli. Sampson Low & Co. 1881.
