= Poenari Castle =

Ruined castle in Romania

- Cetatea Poenari
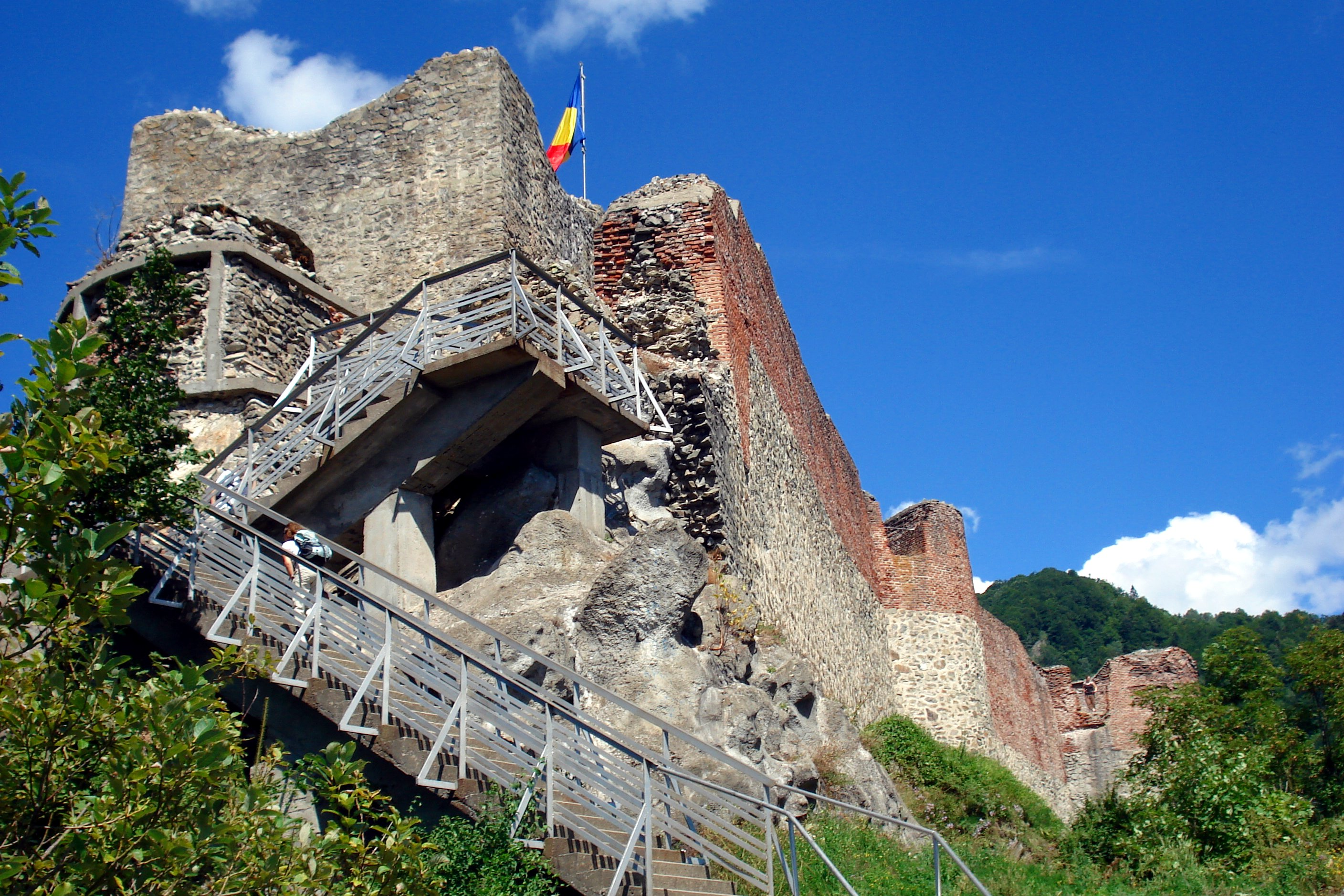
- Poenari Castle in August 2010
- Alternative names: Poenari Citadel; Citadel of Țepeș Vodă; Citadel of Negru Vodă

General information
- Location: Arefu, Argeș County, Romania
- Coordinates: 45°21′13.9″N 24°38′6.8″E
- Construction started: 1453

Dimensions
- Diameter: 60 m (200 ft)

Poenari Castle (Romanian pronunciation: [po.eˈnarʲ]), also known as Poenari Citadel (Romanian: Cetatea Poenari) and Poenari Fortress, is a ruined castle in Romania which was a home of Vlad the Impaler. The citadel is situated on top of a mountain and accessed by climbing 1,480 concrete stairs.

== Location ==
The castle is located on the plateau of Mount Cetatea, facing the west side of the Transfăgărășan, on a canyon formed on the Argeș River valley, close to the Făgăraș Mountains.

== History ==
Before Poenari Castle was constructed in the mid-15th century, another castle around the same location was erected near the beginning of the 13th century by the Wallachians, called Castle Argeș. In the mid-14th century, Castle Argeș became the main citadel of the Basarab dynasty. In the next few decades, the name and the residents changed a few times but eventually the castle was abandoned and left in ruins.

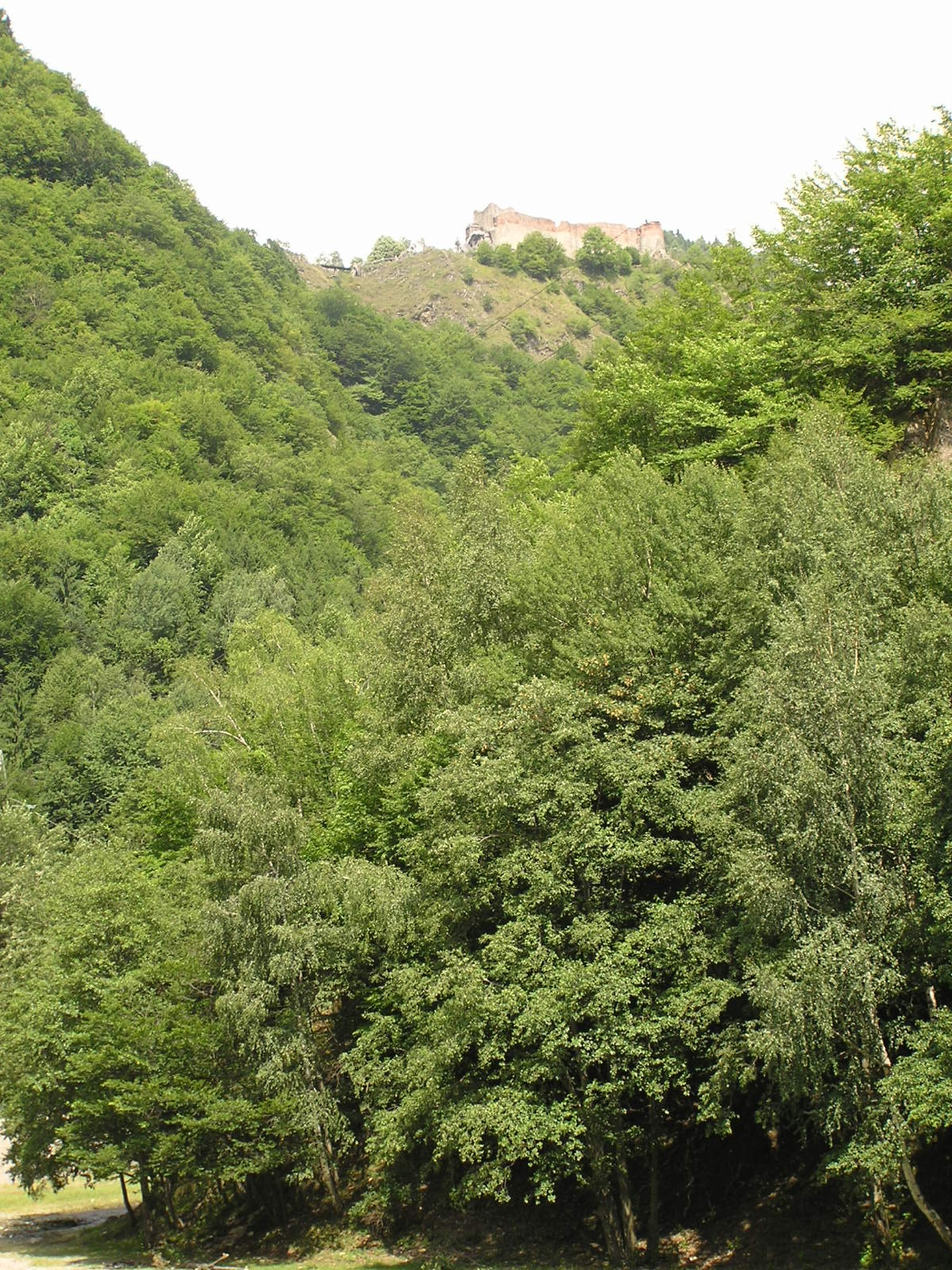
The citadel seen from the national road

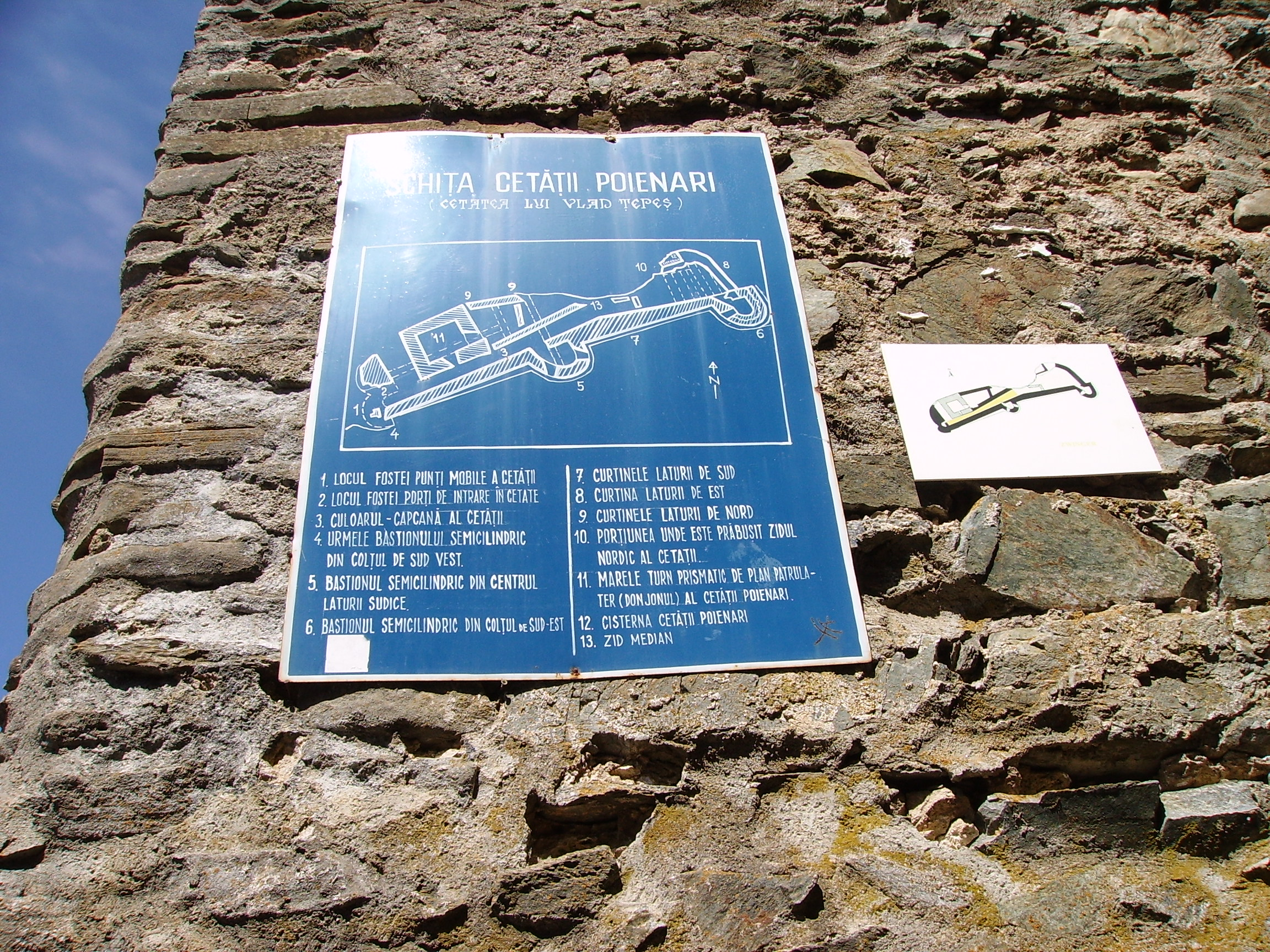
Poenari Castle plan

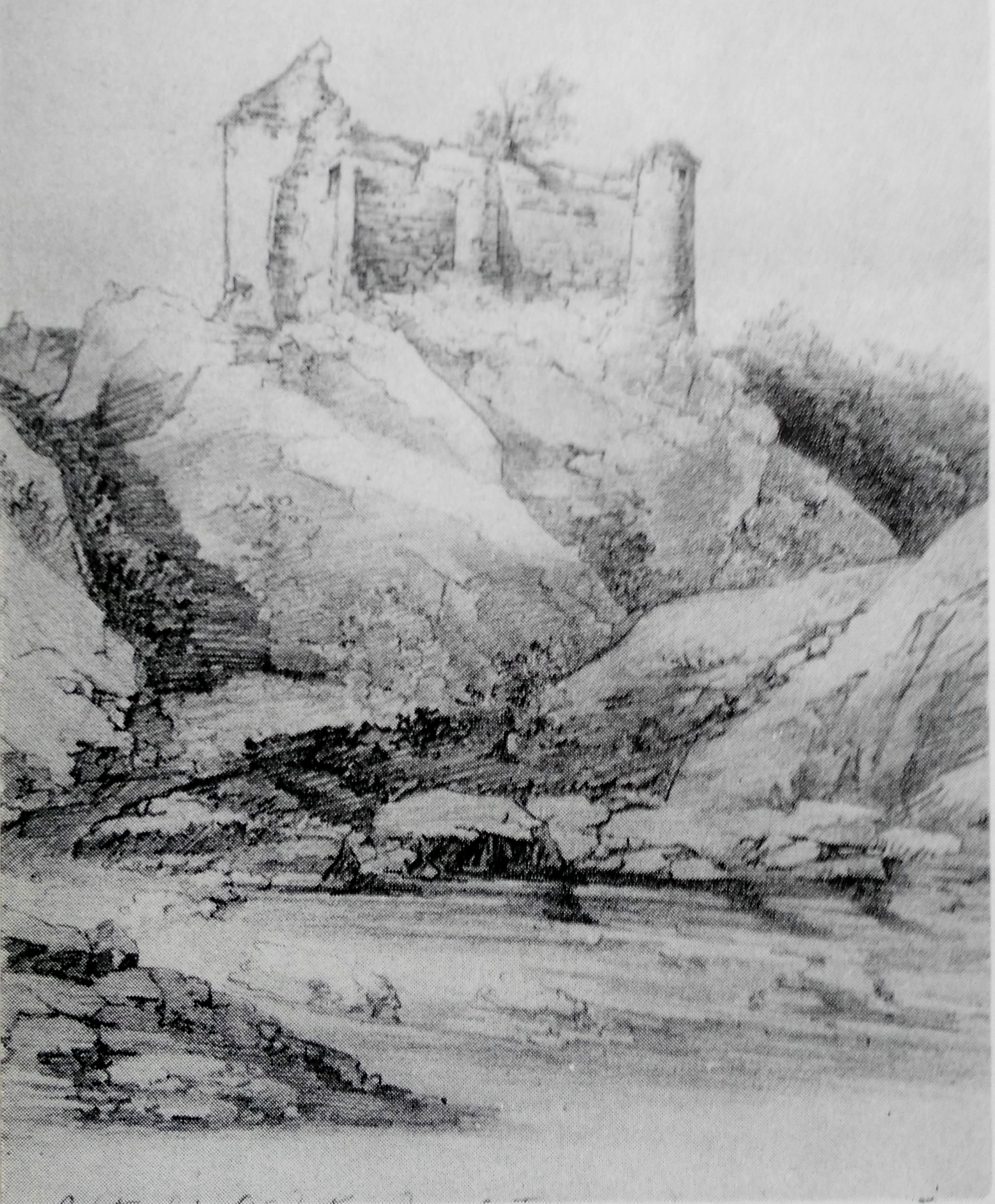
Poenari Castle in 1860

However, in 1459, realising the potential for a second castle perched high on a steep precipice of rock, Vlad the Impaler repaired and consolidated the structure by arresting his enemies from the Wallachian nobility, making it one of his main fortresses. Vlad rebuilt the former Castle Argeș on the left side of the river with stones from the older Castle Poenari, which was on the right bank and somewhat lower. Although the castle was used for many years after Vlad's death in 1476, it eventually was abandoned again in the first half of the 16th century and was in ruins by the 17th century. The size and location of the castle made it difficult to conquer. On 13 January 1913, a landslide caused by an earthquake brought down parts of the castle which crashed into the river below. After two further earthquakes in 1940 and 1977 that caused further damage, it was slightly repaired and the walls and its towers still stand today. Since 2009, the site has been administered by the Argeș County Museum.

== Replica ==
A smaller replica of Poenari Castle was built in 1906 in Bucharest in Carol Park. Originally built for the Romanian General Exhibition, it is one of the few remaining monuments and constructions that used to be in the park. The construction is currently home to the National Office For The Cult of Heroes and it is only open for public twice in a year: on the Heroes’ Day, which in Romania is the same with the Ascension Day, and on the Romanian Army National Day (25 October).

== In popular culture ==
A modern rendering of Poenari Castle was featured in the 2013 BBC Worldwide/Starz television series Da Vinci's Demons. In the episode titled "The Devil", Leonardo da Vinci travels to Poenari Castle in Wallachia to meet with Vlad the Impaler.

The episode "The Hardy Boys & Nancy Drew Meet Dracula" of The Hardy Boys/Nancy Drew Mysteries show in the '70s takes place inside "Dracula's Castle" in "Poenari". Shots of the castle used in the episode are of Poenari Castle, though the episode shows people driving up to the castle gates for a rock festival, which is not possible.

In Dan Simmons 1992 novel "Children of the Night", Poenari Castle is depicted towards the end of the novel as a ritual site to a cult known as "The Family" which consists of the genetically mutated descendants of Vlad the Impaler. While the novel is pure fiction, the description and depiction of the castle and surrounding region contain mostly accurate geographical and historic information.

In Fallout 3, a vampire-related side quest starts in a fictional, post-apocalyptic settlement, constructed on a preserved fragment of a highway in the Washington D.C. area, bearing some visual resemblance to Poenari Castle (e.g. linear structure) and named Arefu (as a hidden reference to the real-life location 6 km [3.7 mi] from Poenari), although the toponym is disguised to look incidental (the sign says CAREFUL with C and L faded away).

It was also featured as a haunted location in Ghost Hunters International in Season 1 (2008–09), episode #14.

In the 2020 documentary Romania: Seeking Dracula’s Castle, the presenters, Greg and Felicity, declare that Poenari deserves the title Dracula's Castle as it has the "heart" of Vlad III.

== Legends ==
Numerous legends and stories about Poenari Castle have survived over the centuries. During the communist era in Romania, foreign visitors sometimes spent the night inside the ruined structure; among them was Fatimeh Pahlavi's husband, Vincent Lee Hillyer, who claimed that in the night the temperature was much lower than usual in the castle (even in the month of July). He smelled rotten flowers although there were none, suffered from bizarre nightmares, inexplicably contracted keratosis, and got the "overpowering feeling" that he was being watched and got bitten without being physically assaulted.

== Gallery ==
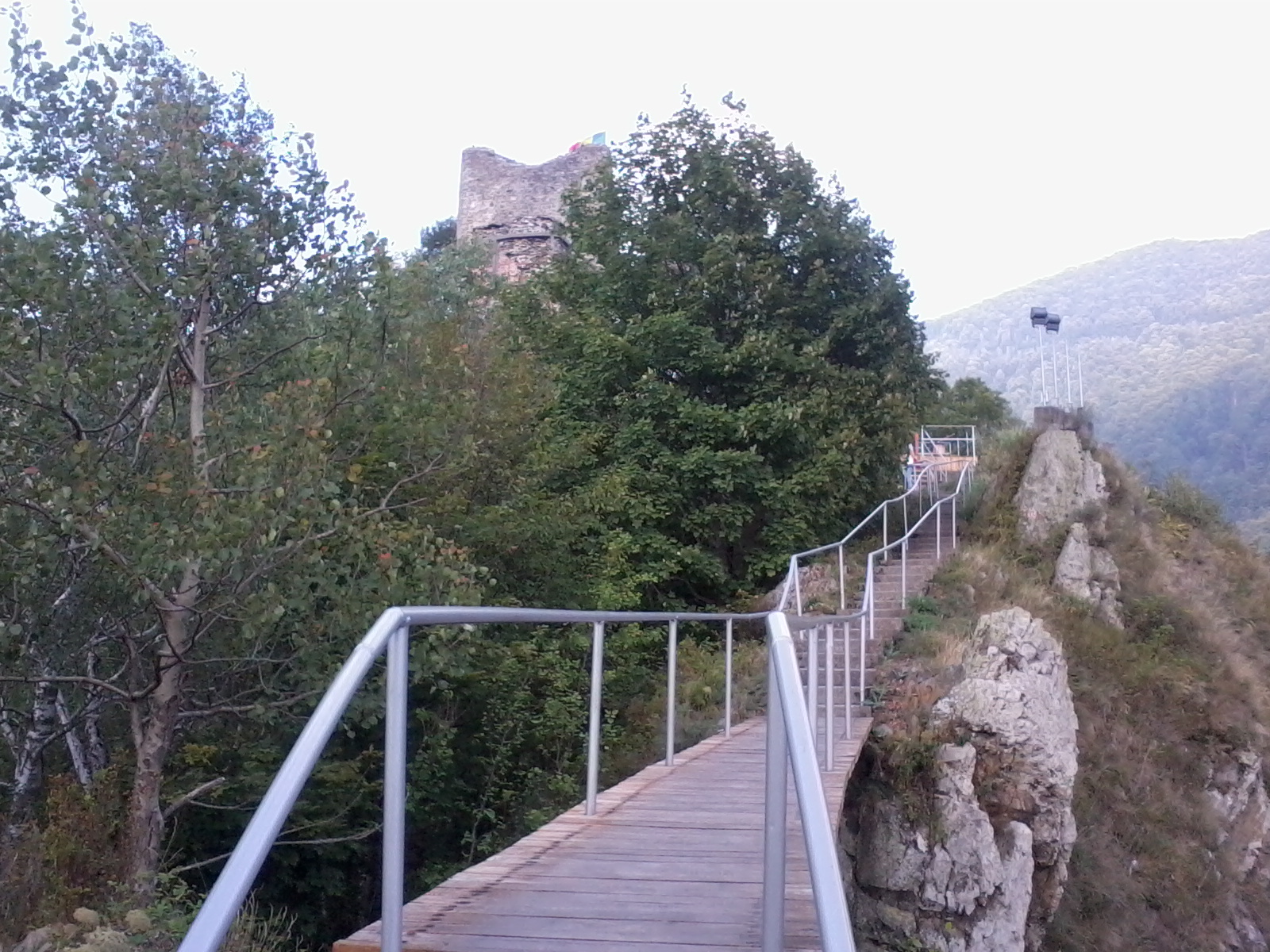

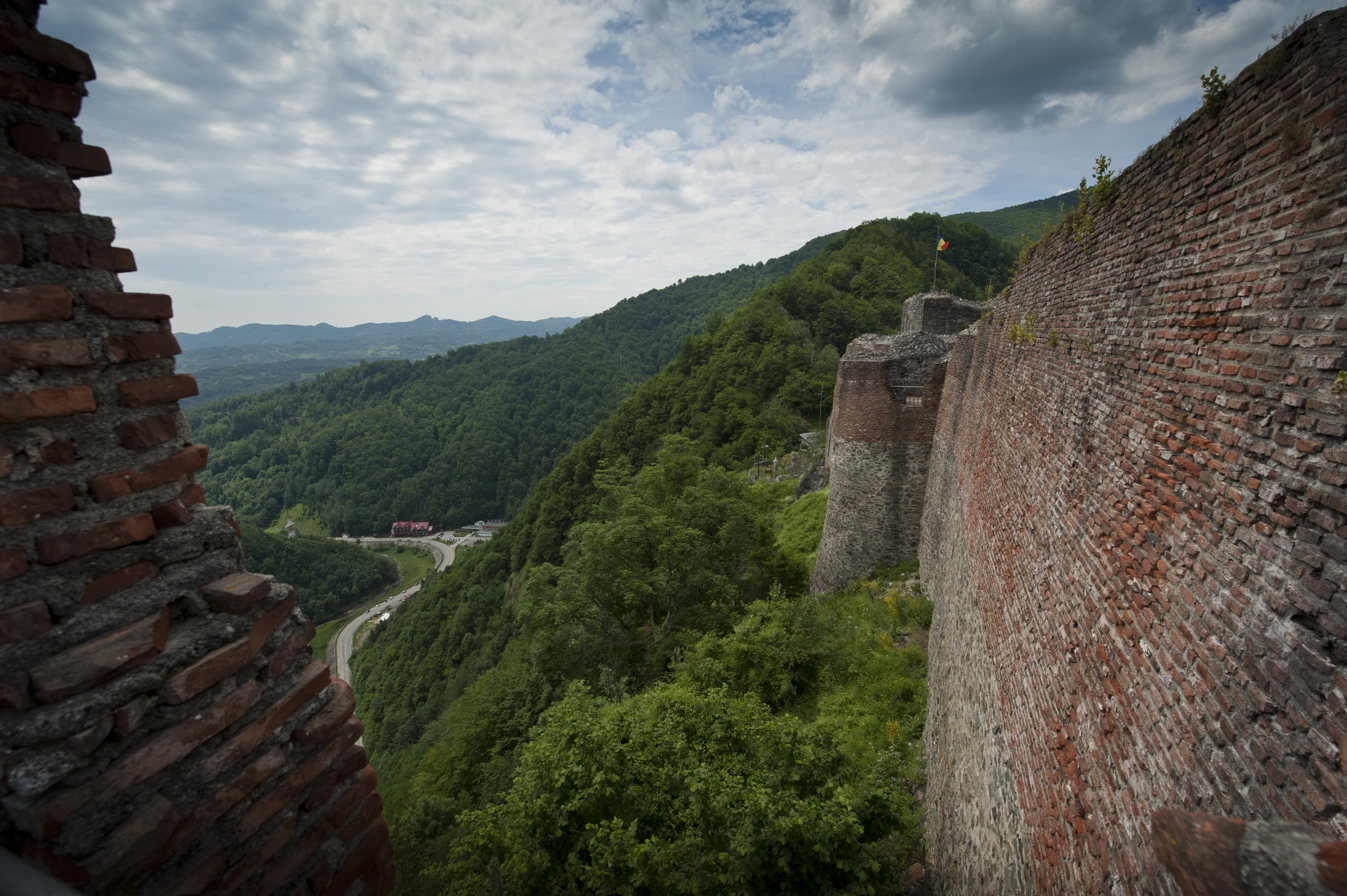

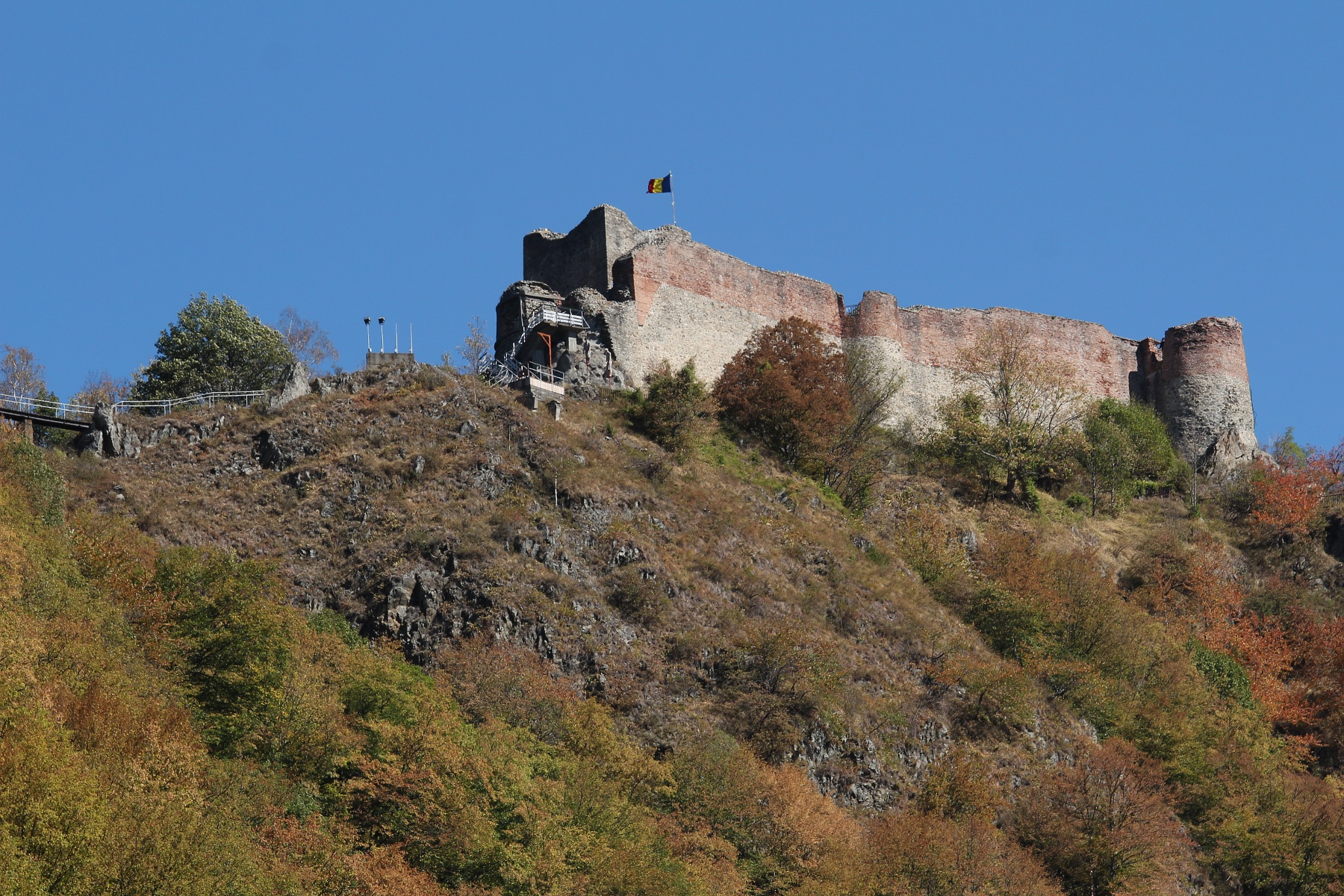

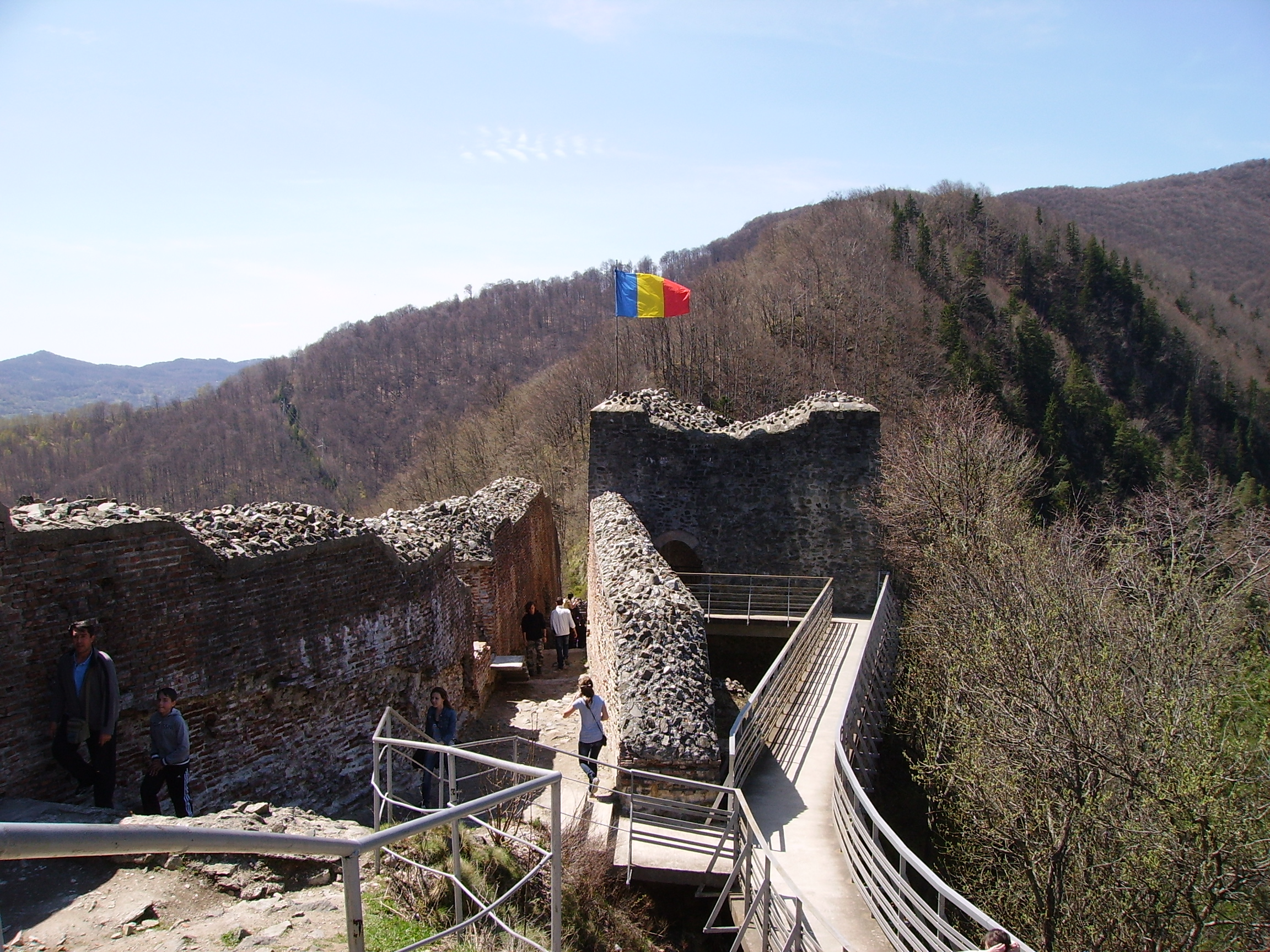

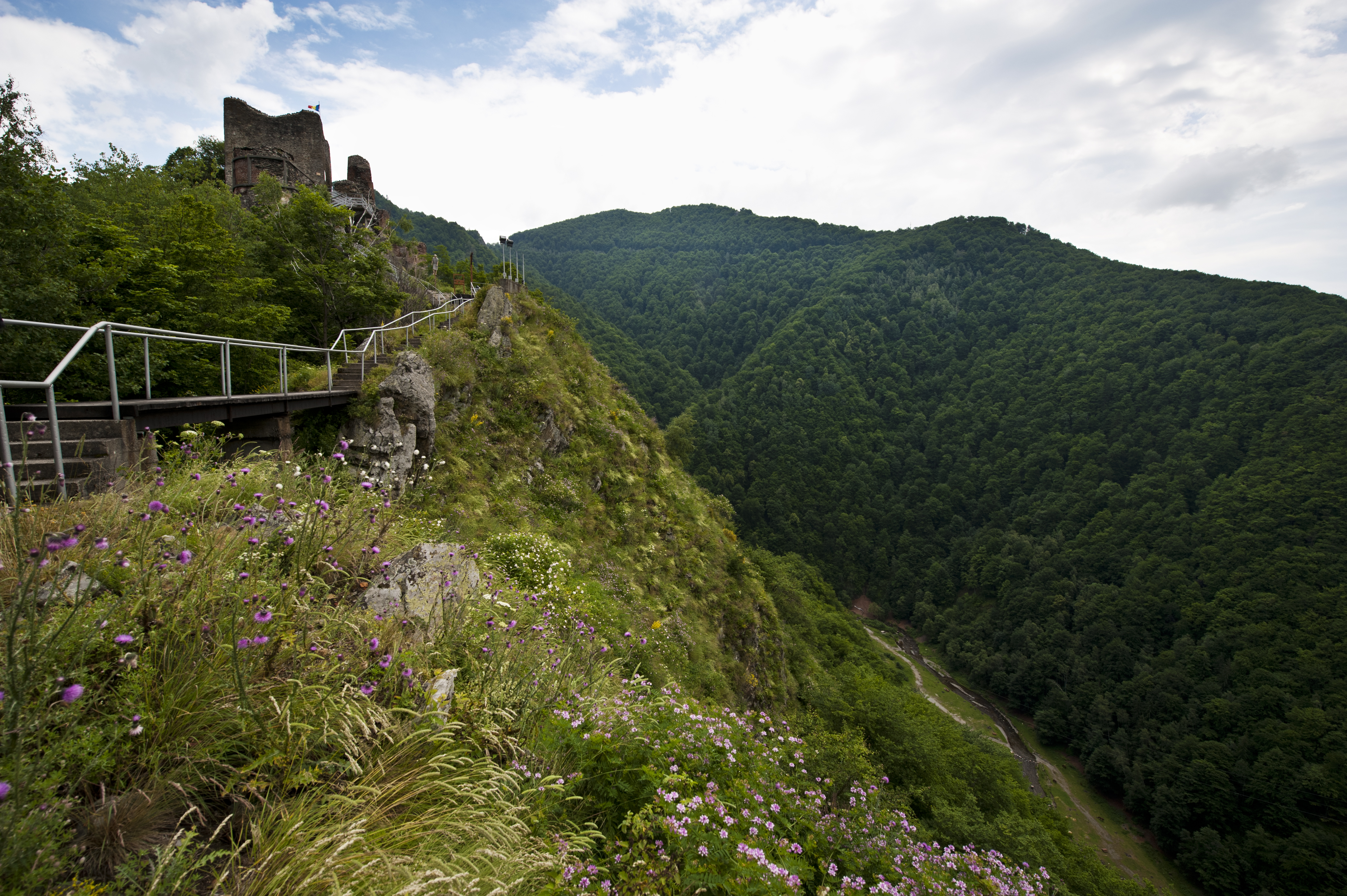

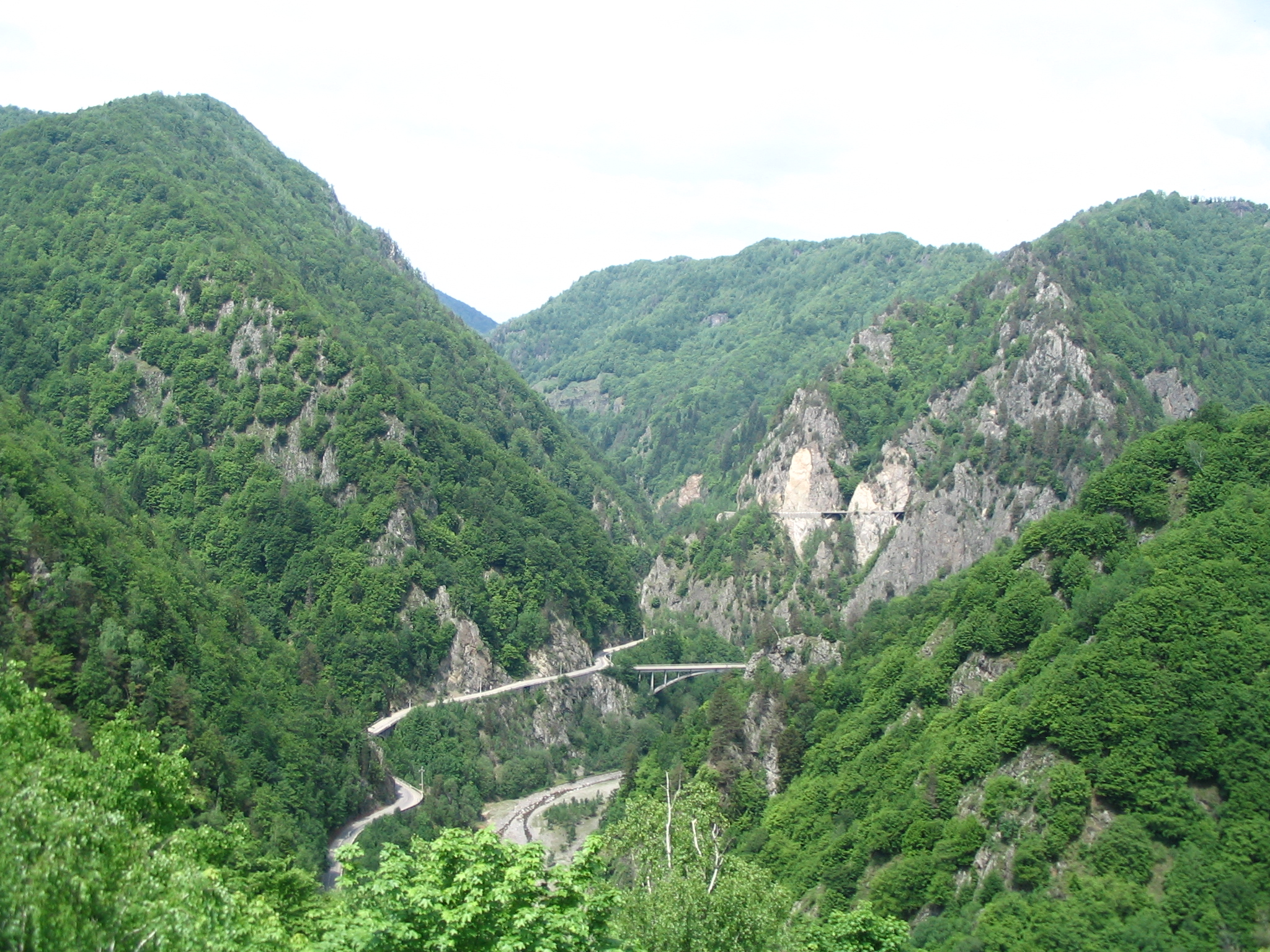
View from the citadel towards Transfăgărăşan

== See also ==
- List of castles and fortresses in Romania
- Tourism in Romania
- Villages with fortified churches in Transylvania
