= 1808 in literature =

This article contains information about the literary events and publications of 1808.

== Events ==
The first Theatre Royal, Covent Garden before the fire of 1808

- January 3 – The Examiner, "A Sunday paper, on politics, domestic economy, and theatricals", is established in London by John Hunt, edited by his brother Leigh Hunt.The newspaper consistently published texts by the leading writers of the day, including Lord Byron, Mary Shelley, Percy Bysshe Shelley, John Keats and William Hazlitt. The Hunt brothers failed in their initial aspiration to refuse advertisements in an effort to increase the newspaper's impartiality. In the first edition, the editor claimed that The Examiner would pursue "truth for its sole object".
- January 30 – The Théâtre St. Philippe opens in New Orleans, Territory of Orleans.
- September 20 – The first Theatre Royal, Covent Garden in London, established in 1732, is destroyed by fire along with most of the scenery, costumes and scripts. The damage was estimated at £250,000.Rebuilding began in December 1808, and the second Theatre Royal, Covent Garden (designed by Robert Smirke) opened on 18 September 1809 with a performance of Macbeth followed by a musical entertainment called The Quaker. The actor-manager John Philip Kemble, raised seat prices to help recoup the cost of rebuilding and the cost of an increased ground rent introduced by the landowner, John Russell, 6th Duke of Bedford, but the move was so unpopular that audiences disrupted the performances by beating sticks, hissing, booing and dancing. The Old Price Riots lasted over two months, and the management was finally forced to accede to the audience's demands.

Uncertain date

- Charles Thomson's Bible Translation from the Greek (Holy Bible, containing the Old and New Covenant) is printed by Jane Aitken in Philadelphia (United States).

== New books ==
=== Fiction ===
- James Norris Brewer – Mountville Castle
- Stéphanie Félicité, comtesse de Genlis – The Earl of Cork
- Sarah Green – Tankerville Family
- Elizabeth Hamilton – The Cottagers of Glenburnie
- Heinrich von Kleist – Die Marquise von O...
- Francis Lathom – The Northern Gallery
- Charles Maturin – The Wild Irish Boy
- Karoline Pichler – Agathocles
- Joseph Strutt – Queenhoo Hall (Completed by Walter Scott)
- Elizabeth Thomas – The Husband and Wife

=== Children ===
- Ann Taylor and Jane Taylor – Hymns for Infant Minds

=== Drama ===
- James Nelson Barker – The Indian Princess
- Matthäus Casimir von Collin – Belas Krieg mit dem Vater (Béla's War with His Father)
- Richard Cumberland – The Jew of Mogadore
- Johann Wolfgang von Goethe – Faust: The First Part of the Tragedy (published)
- Theodore Hook – The Siege of St Quintin
- Heinrich von Kleist
  - Penthesilea
  - The Broken Jug (Der zerbrochne Krug)
- Adam Oehlenschläger
  - Baldur hin Gode
  - Hakon Jarl
- John Tobin – The School for Authors

=== Poetry ===
- William Blake – Milton (probable date)
- Friedrich Schiller – revised version of "Ode to Joy", which formed the basis for the lyrics of Beethoven's 9th Symphony
- Friedrich Hölderlin
  - "Der Rhein"
  - "Patmos"
- Walter Scott – Marmion

=== Non-fiction ===
- Charles Fourier – The Theory of the Four Movements
- J. F. Fries – Neue oder anthropologische Kritik der Vernunft (New Critique of Reason)
- Johann Heinrich Jung – Theorie der Geisterkunde
- Karl Wilhelm Friedrich von Schlegel – Über die Sprache und Weisheit der Indier
- Gotthilf Heinrich von Schubert – Ansichten von der Nachtseite der Naturwissenschaft

== Births ==
- January 27 – David Strauss, German theologian and writer (died 1874)
- February 5 – Carl Spitzweg, German poet (died 1885)
- February 16 – Gustave Planche, French critic (died 1857)
- March 16 – Hannah T. King, British-born American writer and pioneer (died 1886)
- March 22 – Caroline Norton (née Caroline Sheridan), English poet, pamphleteer and social reformer (died 1877)
- March 25 – José de Espronceda, Spanish poet (died 1842)
- April 18 – Teréz Karacs, Hungarian novelist, poet and memoirist (died 1892)
- May 22 – Gérard de Nerval, French poet and translator (died 1855)
- June 17 – Henrik Wergeland, Norwegian poet (died 1845)
- June 21 – John Critchley Prince, English poet (died 1866)
- June 22 – Xavier Marmier, French writer and translator (died 1892)
- June 28 – James Spedding, English author and editor (died 1881)
- July 10 – Solomon Northup, African-American memoirist (died c. 1864)
- September 9 – Wendela Hebbe, Swedish playwright, journalist and novelist (died 1899)
- October 21 – Julia Maitland, English writer on India and children's writer (died 1864)
- November 2 – Jules Amédée Barbey d'Aurevilly, French novelist (died 1889)
- Unknown date – Harriet Ward, English non-fiction and fiction writer (died 1873)

== Deaths ==
- February 12 – Anna Maria Bennett, English novelist (born c. 1760)
- April 4 – Lady Charlotte Murray, English writer and botanist (born 1854)
- May 2 – John Collins, English poet and entertainer (born 1742)
- September 5 – John Home, Scottish poet (born 1722)
- September 13 – Saverio Bettinelli, Italian man of letters (born 1718)
- September 25 – Richard Porson, English classicist (born 1757)
- November 4 – Melchiore Cesarotti, Italian poet (born 1730)
- December 28 – John Duncan, English miscellanist (born 1721)
- c. November/December – Nólsoyar Páll, Faroese merchant and poet, lost at sea (born 1766)

Uncertain date

- Maria Riddell – West Indies-born poet, naturalist and travel writer (born 1772)

== Sources ==
- Sheppard, F.H.W., ed. (1972). Survey of London, Volume XXXV: The Theatre Royal, Drury Lane and The Royal Opera House, Covent Garden. London: Athlone Press. ISBN 0-485-48235-5.
