= North Port High School (Florida) =

Location
- 6400 West Price Boulevard; North Port, Florida 34287; United States; 27°00′12″N 82°09′03″W

Information
- Type: Public
- Motto: When North Port tries, North Port wins
- Established: 2001; 25 years ago
- NCES School ID: 120168003800
- Principal: Shannon Fusco
- Staff: 129 (FTE)
- Grades: 9–12
- Enrollment: 2,577 (2023-24)
- Student to teacher ratio: 19.98
- Campus: small city
- Color: Blue
- Athletics: Florida High School Athletic Association
- Mascot: Bobcat
- Website: www.sarasotacountyschools.net/northporthigh

North Port High School is a high school in North Port, Florida.

== History ==
Prior to the opening of North Port High School, students from North Port typically attended Venice High School, in a facility built in 1951 which had become overcrowded by 1999. North Port students had previously attended Lemon Bay High School through an agreement with Charlotte County Public Schools. It had been 40 years since the last high school had been built in Sarasota County when NPHS was established.

North Port High School's first principal, George Kenney, was selected by the Sarasota County School Superintendent David Bennett in 1999, and subsequently approved by the school board in 2000. Kenney had previously worked in administration at Lemon Bay High School and Pine View School for the Gifted. By January 2001, 30 employees had been hired, including an assistant principal, lead football coach, athletic director, and band director, with a grand opening scheduled for August 3rd and August 13 marking the first day of school for students grades 6 through 10. Students entering grades 11 and 12 mostly remained at Venice High School when North Port High first opened.

North Port High School received international attention when its principal was accused of practicing hypnosis on students, parents, and staff without a license. George Kenney, whom ABC News described as a "popular principal," was placed on administrative leave and investigated by law enforcement after admitting to hypnotizing as many as 75 people between 2006 and 2011, three of whom died allegedly in connection to his hypnosis, and to initially lying about hypnotizing the first three student fatalities. According to reports, Kenney's practice of hypnosis was widely known, but the practice of "therapeutic hypnosis" is illegal in Florida if not conducted or monitored by a licensed medical professional. The case was later featured in a documentary series by AMC Networks titled Look Into My Eyes

== School structure ==
North Port High School was originally envisioned as an "academy style learning school," in which students would remain in the same classroom cluster throughout the day and teachers would move from one classroom to another.

== Extra curricular activities ==
=== Athletics ===
North Port High School's competitive cheerleading team has performed at the Florida High School Athletic Association's state championships. The team was runner up for state champions in 2021 for medium varsity co-ed for class 2A, and has been top ten in the state for extra large varsity (2012), medium varsity (2015), medium co-ed (2021), small co-ed (2022), and extra large non-tumbling (2023).

=== Junior Reserve Officers' Training Corps ===
A year prior to the school opening, incoming principal George Kenney sought to establish a Junior Reserve Officers' Training Corps program with the United States Air Force, with an anticipation of 620 students in ninth and tenth grade.

== Campus ==
North Port High School's campus was designed by Sarasota based architects with Ranon & Partners, who put an emphasis on school safety at the direction of the school board, placing administration at a centralized part of the campus where leadership could see all parts of the campus with a clear line of sight. The campus was a $52 million dollar project, which included athletic fields but omitted associated concession stands in anticipation of the North Port Area Contractor's Association building them as a donation, according to plans drawn by Gene Willis.

The campus includes North Port Performing Arts Center, which is available for public use and opened in November 2001, and features an acoustically treated building with spotlights and an 80-foot tower for hanging backdrops, something unlike anything in the City of North Port prior. In addition to programs affiliated with North Port High School, the performing arts center routinely hosts performances by unaffiliated local groups.

== Former principals ==
- George F. Kenney - 2001-2012
