= Marick Press =

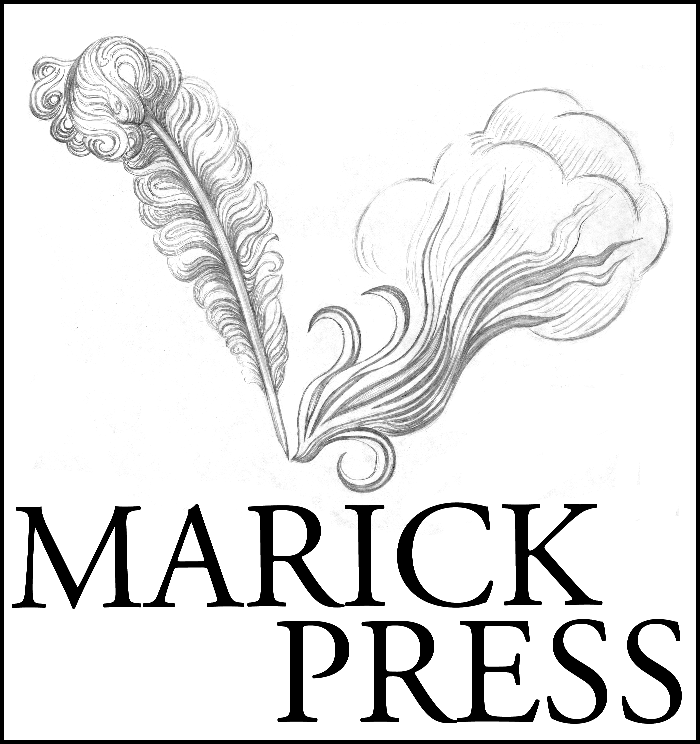
- Founded: 2005
- Founder: Mariela Griffor
- Country of origin: United States
- Headquarters location: Washington, D.C.
- Distribution: Ingram Content Group
- Publication types: Books
- Official website: www.marickpress.com

Marick Press is an independent, for-profit small press based in Washington DC. It publishes 6-18 titles annually in both hardcover and paperback, covering a broad spectrum of topics ranging from literary non-fiction and creative non-fiction to poetry, fiction, and reprint of previously published titles. It is a literary publisher, founded to preserve the best work by poets around the world, including many under-published women poets. Marick Press looks for and publishes new work from a wide variety of styles, focusing on works that are well-crafted, unique, and offer fresh themes.

== History ==
Marick Press is a for-profit publishing house that was founded in Grosse Pointe Park, Michigan, in 2005. Mariela Griffor, founder and publisher, has won prizes in Europe, South America and the US for her poetry. Under Griffor's leadership Marick has attracted nationally and internationally known writers to its editorial staff. Marick published its first three books at a joint launch with the Detroit Institute of the Arts in April 2006. In 2007 the press published its first novel. By 2011 the press published such acclaimed authors as Paul Celan, Jerome Rothenberg, Alicia Ostriker, Franz Wright, Lars Ahlstroem, Charlee Brodsky, Derick Burleson, Peter Conners, Jim Daniels, Chard DeNiord, Regina Derieva, Sean Thomas Dougherty, Jorge Etcheverry, Brian Evenson, Robert Fanning, Piotr Florczyk, Robin Fulton, Katie Ford, Gunnar Harding, Jim Harms, James Hart III, Anselm Hollo, Laird Hunt, Kawita Kandpal, James Kates, Susan Kelly-DeWitt, Joshua Kornreich, Gerry LaFemina, David Dodd Lee, Francesco Levato, Petter Lindgren, Robert Lipton, David Matlin, Caroline Maun, Jane McCafferty, Ray McManus, Malena Morling, Alicia Ostriker, Daniel Padilla, Dawn Paul, William Rowe, Jim Schley, Mary Sanders Smith, Alexander Suczek, Russell Thorburn, G.C.Waldrep, David Young, Raul Zurita, Eliana Deborah Langiu, Richard Frost, Todd Swift, Karina Borowicz, Ming Di, Jennifer Tseng, Travis Wayne Denton, Dario Jaramillo Agudelo, Don Share, Christophe Claro, Chad Sweeney, Kjell Espmark, Ingela Strandberg, and Goran Malmqvist. The press also continues with its legacy of publishing promising new authors including Katie Farris, Ilya Kaminsky, Jim Schley, Giuseppe Bartoli, and others. The press had many successes publishing poetry. In 2015, Marick Press moved its publishing operations to Washington D.C.

Marick Press started with A Complex Bravery and The Sleeping.Derick Burleson of Alaska, whose book Never Night was published by Marick in spring of 2008, won the Felix Pollak Prize in Poetry for his first book Ejo: Poems, Rwanda 1991-94. Burleson was a runner up for the Pulitzer Prize. Another of Marick's authors, Peter Conners, who has just published Emily Ate the Wind, is the Editor of BOA Editions, an historically important independent American press. Marick Press currently publishes 6-18 books a year under all of its imprints.

== Noted Publications ==
- Gematrias Complete by Jerome Rothenberg
- The Catfish by Franz Wright
- At the Revelation Restaurant and other poems by Alicia Ostriker
