= Daniel Duncan =

Daniel Duncan, Dan Duncan, or Danny Duncan may refer to:

- Daniel Duncan (physician) (1649–1735), Scottish-French doctor and chemist
- Daniel Duncan (Ohio politician) (1806–1849), congressman from the US state of Ohio
- Daniel Duncan McKenzie (1859–1927), parliamentarian and jurist from the Canadian province of Nova Scotia
- Daniel Kablan Duncan (born 1943), foreign minister of Côte d'Ivoire
- Dan Duncan (1933–2010), American co-founder, chairman and majority shareholder of Enterprise Products
- Danny Duncan (musician) (born 1986), musician with We the Kings
- Danny Duncan (YouTuber) (born 1992), prank and comedy YouTuber
