= PGMS =

PGMS may refer to:

- Physician Group Management Services
- Punta Gorda Middle School
- Platinum Group Metals
- Piney Grove Middle School
