= Englewood, Florida =

Census-designated place in Florida, United States

- Census-designated place
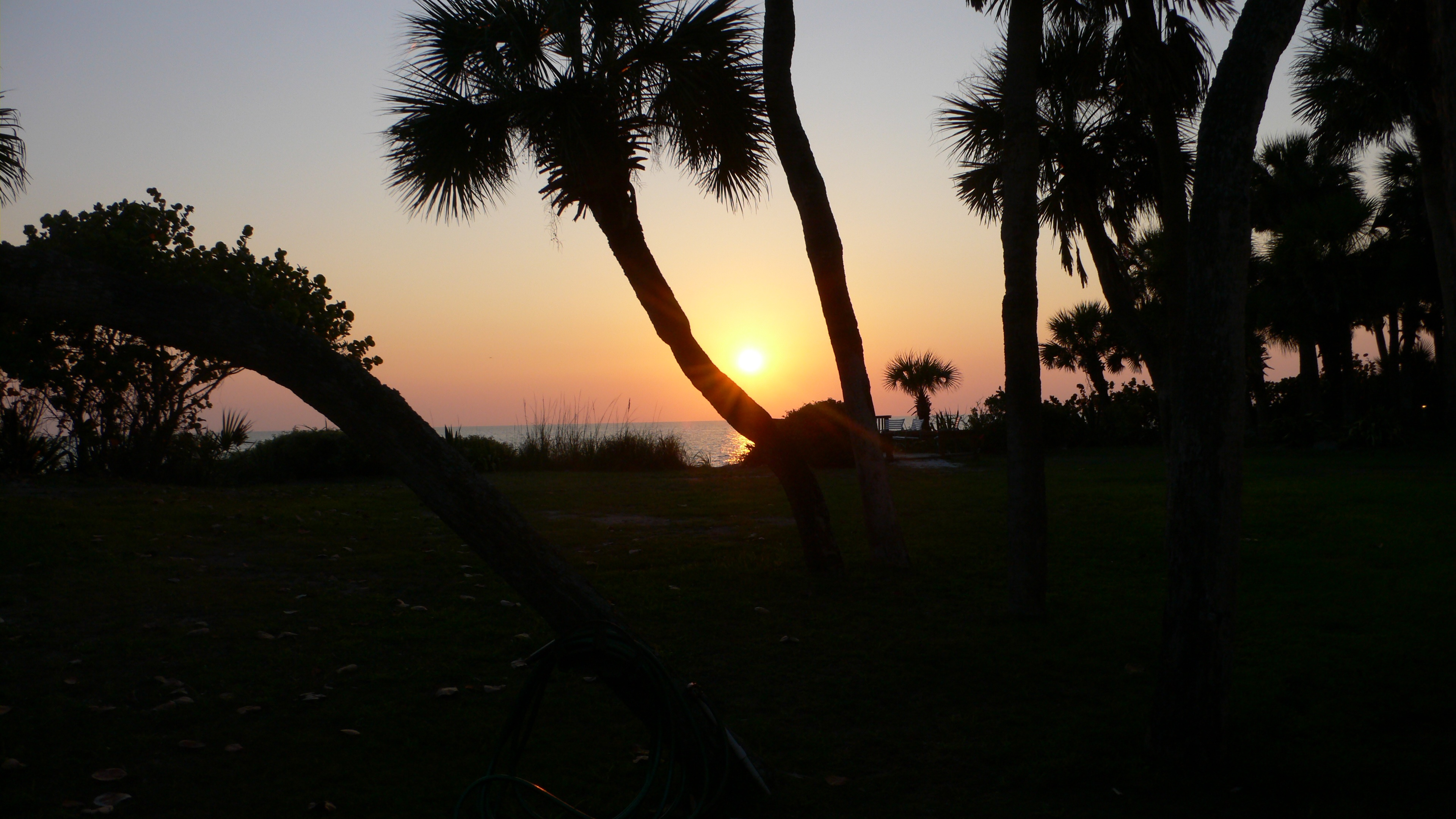
- Sunset from the Manasota Beach Club

- Location in Sarasota County and the state of Florida
- Coordinates: 26°59′13″N 82°21′50″W
- Country: United States
- State: Florida
- Counties: Sarasota, Charlotte
- Platted: 1896

Area
  - Total: 22.32 sq mi (57.82 km^{2})
  - Land: 18.82 sq mi (48.75 km^{2})
  - Water: 3.50 sq mi (9.07 km^{2})
- Elevation: 13 ft (4.0 m)

Population (2020)
  - Total: 20,800
  - Density: 1,105.0/sq mi (426.65/km^{2})
- Time zone: UTC−05:00 (Eastern (EST))
  - Summer (DST): UTC−04:00 (EDT)
- ZIP Codes: 34223, 34224, 34295
- Area code: 941
- FIPS code: 12-20825
- GNIS feature ID: 2402455

Englewood is a census-designated place (CDP) in Charlotte and Sarasota counties in the U.S. state of Florida. As of the 2020 census, it had a population of 20,800, up from 14,863 at the 2010 census. It is part of the North Port-Bradenton-Sarasota, Florida Metropolitan Statistical Area. Popular entertainment includes the beach, restaurants, and a small shopping district located primarily along West Dearborn Street.

== History ==
Archeological digs in what is now Englewood discovered ceramics belonging to both the Weeden Island culture and Safety Harbor culture.

One of the earliest white settlers in the area was William Goff, who arrived by schooner from Tampa in 1878. He settled a piece of land a few miles south of where Englewood would be platted. On July 3, 1895, a post office was established in the area as well. The Great Freeze of 1894 and 1895, along with a bad freeze in 1896, led to the decimation of many local orange plants. For this reason, by 1897, a Manatee County General Directory listed fish as the chief product for Englewood.

The original plat of Englewood was recorded and filed on August 17, 1896. The home lots were 1-acre (0.40 ha), and the grove lots—likely intended for citrus—were 10 acres (4.0 ha). The area was developed by three brothers, and the name Englewood came from their hometown, Englewood, Chicago. Some streets, such as Dearborn, Harvard, and Yale, are named after those in Chicago.

In 1898, the Englewood Inn was opened, a relatively large hotel with 16 rooms. The hotel serviced visitors from up north until it burned down in 1909.

Both Sarasota and Charlotte Counties were created in 1921. Englewood was initially more on the Sarasota side of the modern county line; as it expanded, it came to be more equally in both counties.

In 2024, heavy rainfall from Hurricane Helene followed less than two weeks later by storm surge from Hurricane Milton caused extensive damage to Englewood. A number of houses were flooded during Helene and then destroyed during Milton.

== Geography ==
According to the United States Census Bureau, the CDP has a total area of 13.1 square miles (33.8 km^{2}), of which 9.8 square miles (25.4 km^{2}) is land and 3.3 square miles (8.5 km^{2}), or 24.99%, is water.

== Demographics ==
Historical population
Census	Pop.	Note	%±
1970	3,549		—
1980	7,657		115.8%
1990	15,025		96.2%
2000	16,196		7.8%
2010	14,863		−8.2%
2020	20,800		39.9%

=== 2020 census ===
As of the 2020 census, Englewood had a population of 20,800. The median age was 66.9 years. 1.2% of residents were under the age of 5, 6.8% were under the age of 18, and 55.2% were 65 years of age or older. For every 100 females there were 91.1 males, and for every 100 females age 18 and over there were 90.1 males age 18 and over.

97.0% of residents lived in urban areas, while 3.0% lived in rural areas.

There were 10,932 households in Englewood, of which 7.2% had children under the age of 18 living in them. Of all households, 51.2% were married-couple households, 16.8% were households with a male householder and no spouse or partner present, and 25.5% were households with a female householder and no spouse or partner present. About 34.3% of all households were made up of individuals and 24.0% had someone living alone who was 65 years of age or older.

There were 14,543 housing units, of which 24.8% were vacant. The homeowner vacancy rate was 2.2% and the rental vacancy rate was 13.9%.

Racial composition as of the 2020 census
Race	Number	Percent
White	19,517	93.8%
Black or African American	71	0.3%
American Indian and Alaska Native	47	0.2%
Asian	161	0.8%
Native Hawaiian and Other Pacific Islander	6	0.0%
Some other race	201	1.0%
Two or more races	797	3.8%
Hispanic or Latino (of any race)	717	3.4%

=== American Community Survey estimates ===
The CDP had an owner-occupied housing unit rate of 85.6%. The median value of owner-occupied housing units was $233,800 and the median gross rent was $1,068. 93.1% of households had a computer and 84.5% had a broadband internet subscription.

There were 2,626 veterans living in the CDP, and 7.2% of the population were foreign-born persons.

94.2% of the population 25 years and older were high school graduates or higher, and 30.2% of that same population had a bachelor's degree or higher.

== Education ==
The Englewood Community Redevelopment Area (CRA) is a special district created by the Sarasota County Board of County Commissioners in 1999 on the Sarasota side of Englewood. The Sarasota and Charlotte County School Districts have an interlocal agreement allowing some Charlotte County residents to use the Englewood Elementary School and the Sarasota County students to use the Middle and High School located in Charlotte County. Englewood has a private utility company, the Englewood Water District, and the Englewood Fire District that serve the community.

Englewood contains multiple public elementary schools and one public high school (Lemon Bay High School). Several private schools are also located within Englewood. Englewood Christian Academy, Heritage Christian Academy, and Genesis Christian Academy offer grades K–12. L.A. Ainger Middle School, a public school serving grades 6–8, located in nearby Rotonda West, Florida, is the nearest public middle school.

== Notable residents ==
- David E. Demag, US Marshal for Vermont
- Danny Duncan, prank and comedy YouTuber
