= John Duncan (English writer) =

- Born: 1721
- Died: 1808 (aged 86–87)

John Duncan D.D. (3 November 1721 – 28 December 1808) was an English miscellaneous writer, and British Army chaplain.

== Life ==
He was born in Bath, a younger son of Dr. Daniel Duncan, author of some religious tracts, and grandson of Daniel Duncan, M.D., whose memoir (together with an account of the Duncan family) he contributed to the Biographia Britannica.

He was born 3 November 1721, entered Merchant Taylors' School at the age of twelve, and proceeded thence (1739) to St John's College, Oxford, as probationary fellow. After graduating (M.A. 1746), and taking holy orders, he became chaplain to the forces, and served with the king's own regiment during the Scots' rebellion in 1746, and afterwards at the Siege of St. Philip's Castle, Minorca.

He was made D.D. by decree of convocation in 1757, he was presented six years later to the college living of South Warnborough, Hampshire, which he retained until his death at Bath, 28 December 1808.

== Works ==
He published:

1. A sermon on The Defects and Dangers of a Pharisaical Righteousness, Glasgow, 1751;
2. An Address to the Rational Advocates for the Church of England, by Phileleutherus Tyro (1759);
3. The Evidence of Reason in Proof of the Immortality of the Soul. Collected from the manuscripts of Mr. Baxter (by J. D.), to which is prefixed a letter from the editor to Dr. Priestley (1779);
4. and a poetical "Essay on Happiness, in four books", which went through a second edition in 1772,

besides tracts and other fugitive pieces.
