= Caroline Maun =

American writer (born 1968)

Caroline C. Maun
- Born: January 14, 1968 (age 58) Lansing, Michigan, U.S.
- Occupation: Professor, author, poet, lyricist, musician
- Education: Lemon Bay High School; Eckerd College; North Carolina State University (MA); University of Tennessee (PhD)

Caroline C. Maun (born January 14, 1968) is an American professor, author, poet, lyricist, and musician. She teaches creative writing in the English Department at Wayne State University in Detroit, Michigan. Other areas of research include modernism, American Literature, African-American literature, and Internet Writing.

== Early life and education ==
Maun was born in Lansing, Michigan. She moved with her family to Englewood, Florida in 1971 where she attended Englewood Elementary School and later graduated from Lemon Bay High School in 1986.

Maun graduated with honors from Eckerd College in St. Petersburg, Florida as an English major in 1990. In 1992, she earned a MA in English from North Carolina State University in Raleigh, North Carolina. Her M.A. thesis research documented Emily Dickinson and her 1890s editors, especially Mabel Loomis Todd. She then earned a Ph.D. in English from the University of Tennessee at Knoxville in 1998, where she wrote a dissertation on Evelyn Scott's unpublished volume of verse, “The Gravestones Wept.” This research later became The Collected Poems of Evelyn Scott, published by The National Poetry Foundation in 2005.

== Career ==
Maun was hired as a lecturer at Morgan State University in Baltimore, Maryland in 1998. She became an assistant professor of Rhetoric and Composition, and was a founding Director of the university's Writing Center. Moving to Wayne State University, she was appointed assistant professor in the Department of Interdisciplinary Studies in 2004. She became an assistant professor in the Department of English in 2008, and in 2011 an associate professor.

Maun has written three books of poetry. Two poems from her book The Sleeping were nominated for a Pushcart Prize. Maun's poetry has been published in Third Wednesday, Raving Dove, and Chickenbones: a Journal for Literary and Artistic African-American Themes.

As well as composing and publishing her own work, Maun has written analysis and criticism of poetry. She is the author of the book Mosaic of Fire, which analyses the work of four women authors. In 2015 this book was held in more than 600 libraries.

== Awards ==
- Thornton Wilder Fellowship in Wilder Studies, Beinecke Rare Book and Manuscript Library, Yale University, 2012.
- Bear River Writers Conference Scholarship, 2012.
- College Language Association Presidential Award, 2007.

== Books ==
- Mosaic of Fire: The Work of Lola Ridge, Evelyn Scott, Charlotte Wilder, and Kay Boyle. Columbia, SC: University of South Carolina Press, 2012.
- Greatest Hits: 1999-2010. Columbus, OH: Pudding House Press, 2010.
- Cures and Poisons. Columbus, OH: Pudding House Press, 2009.
- The Sleeping. Detroit, MI: Marick Press, 2006.
- The Collected Poems of Evelyn Scott (Editor). Orono, ME: National Poetry Foundation, University of Maine, 2005.
- What Remains, Main Street Rag Publishing Company
