= 16 Handles =

American frozen yogurt store

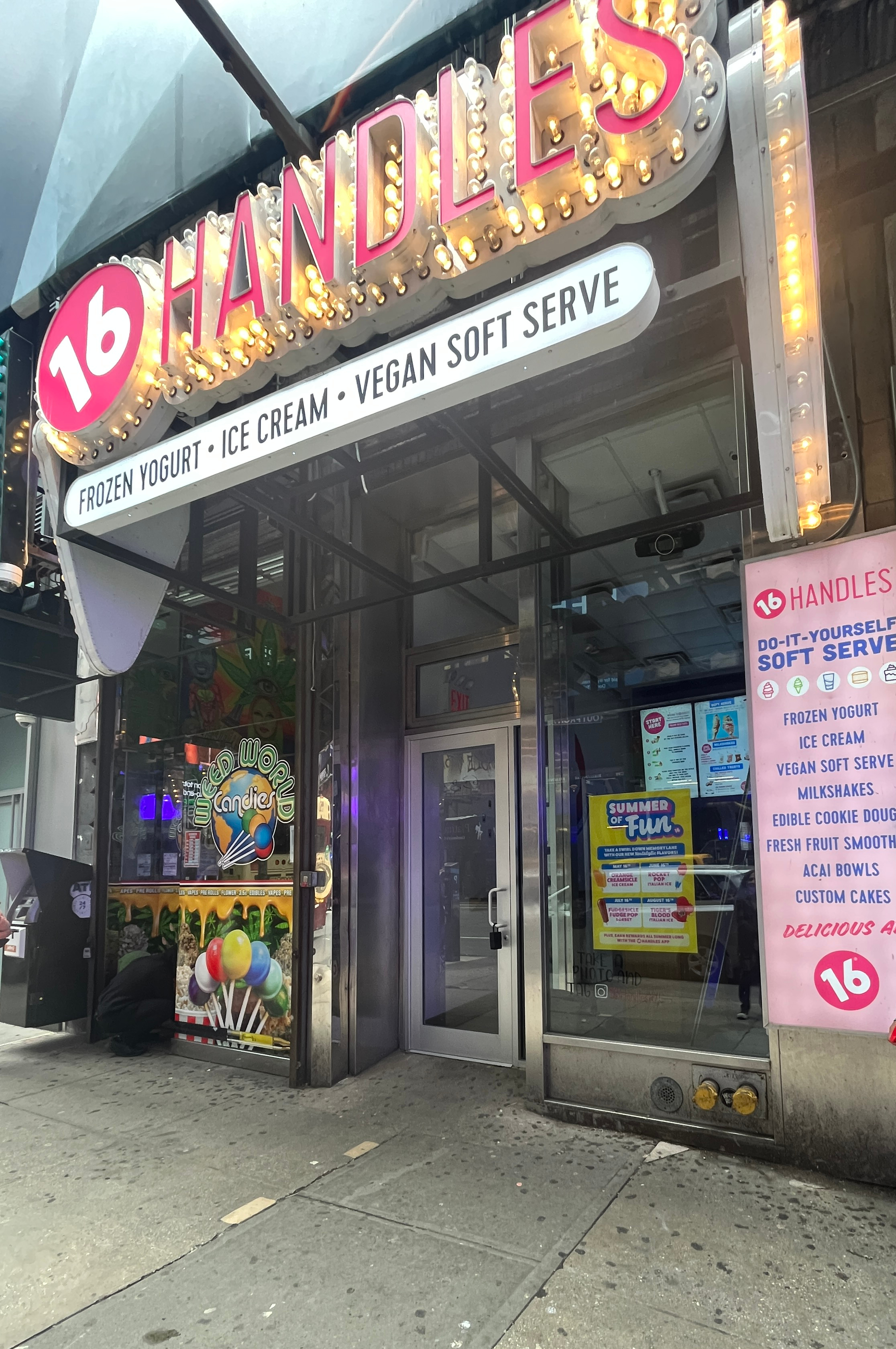
- Company type: Privately held company
- Industry: Restaurants
- Founded: 2008
- Founder: Solomon Choi
- Headquarters: New York City, US
- Number of locations: 35 (in 2022)
- Products: Frozen yogurt
- Website: 16handles.com

16 Handles is a self-serve frozen yogurt company that allows customers to create their own customized frozen yogurt desserts. It was founded in 2008 by Solomon Choi. The company's name, "16 Handles", refers to the 16 rotating flavors of frozen yogurt available at any given time and is also a play on the name of the movie Sixteen Candles.

== Operations ==
16 Handles uses a self-serve model, which allows customers to control the amount of yogurt they want and select their own toppings. After filling their cups with frozen yogurt, customers can visit the toppings bar, where they can choose from a range of options, including fruits, candies, nuts, sauces, and more. The customer pays by weight.

Over the years, 16 Handles has expanded its presence, opening numerous locations across the United States to 35 units in 2022. The company has also embraced technological advancements, introducing mobile apps and advertising on social media like Snapchat. It has units in New Jersey, Massachusetts, Texas, South Carolina and Florida.

In 2022, 16 Handles was acquired by Neil Hershman, a New York entrepreneur who became the company's chief executive officer, and Danny Duncan, a YouTube personality who is the chief creative officer.

In June 2024, 16 Handles founder Solomon Choi died.

== See also ==
- List of frozen dessert brands
