= Queenhoo Hall =

1808 novel

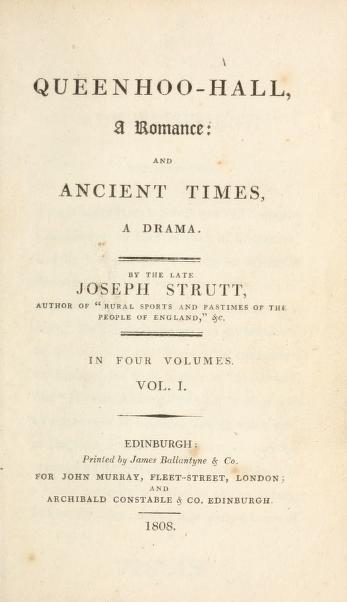
- Author: Joseph Strutt; Walter Scott
- Language: English
- Genre: Historical fiction
- Publisher: John Murray (London); Constable (Edinburgh)
- Publication date: 1808
- Publication place: United Kingdom
- Media type: Print

Queenhoo Hall is a historical novel largely written by Joseph Strutt but left unfinished at his death in 1802. It was completed by Walter Scott at the behest of his friend James Ballantyne and publisher John Murray, and released in 1808. Scott added two chapters to the existing manuscript. It is set during the reign of Henry VI of England.

Joseph Strutt was a noted antiquarian who had a particular interest in the Medieval era and the Gothic style. He began writing the novel under the title Emma Darcy, but died before he could complete it. It used many themes of Gothic literature which had emerged in the eighteenth century. It takes its title from an eponymous manor house at Tewin in Hertfordshire.

Scott described it as part of his own "advance towards romantic composition". Scott was known at this time as a poet but later launched into a celebrated series of novels with his 1814 work Waverley. With Ivanhoe in 1819 he wrote the first of his bestsellers set in the same medieval era that Strutt's earlier work had been set in, drawing his research on antiquarians including Strutt for the historical setting. Scott admired Daniel Defoe's historical writing, and offered theoretical underpinnings for the nature of historical fiction.

== Bibliography ==
- Hill, Rosemary. Time's Witness. Penguin, 2021.
- Townshend, Dale. Gothic Antiquity: History, Romance, and the Architectural Imagination, 1760–1840. Oxford University Press, 2019.
