= Mariela Griffor =

American poet

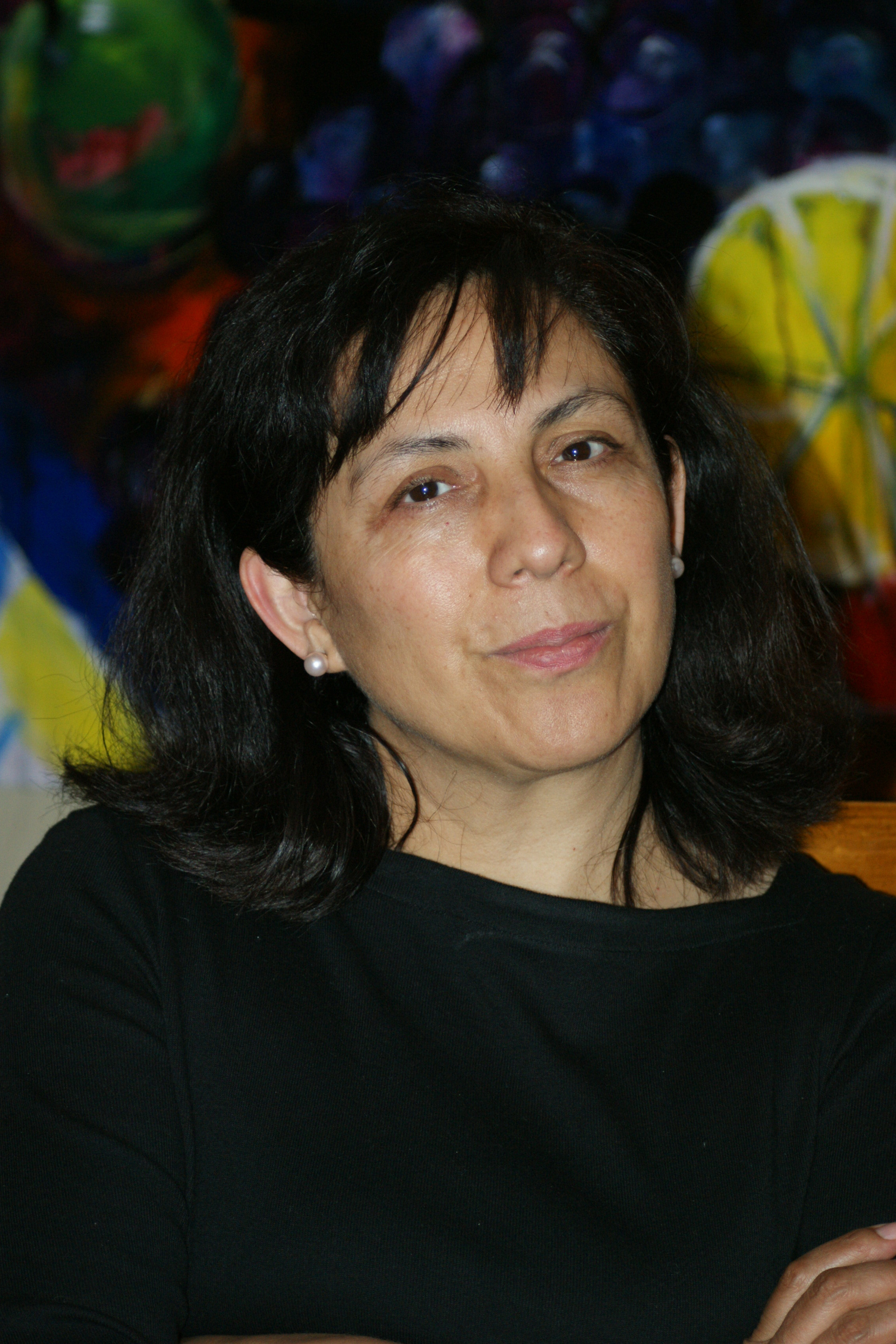
- Born: September 29, 1961 (age 64); Concepción, Chile
- Occupations: Poet, translator, diplomat
- Known for: Poetry, publisher
- Website: www.marielagriffor.com

Mariela Griffor (born September 29, 1961, in Concepcion, Chile), is a poet, editor, publisher of Marick Press and diplomat. She is author of four poetry collections, Exiliana, House, The Psychiatrist and most recently, Declassified (Eyewear Publishing, 2016), and has had her poems and translations published in many literary journals and magazines including Poetry International, Washington Square Review, Texas Poetry Review, and Éditions d'art Le Sabord, in anthologies including Poetry in Michigan / Michigan in Poetry, from New Issues Press. A variety of Griffor's poems has been translated into Italian, French, Chinese, Swedish, and Spanish. She has been nominated to the Griffin Poetry Prize, to the Whiting Awards and the PEN/Beyond Margins Award. She was finalist and shortlisted for the 2017 National Translation Award for Canto General by Pablo Neruda.

== Early life ==
Griffor was born in Concepcion, Chile. She attended the University of Santiago and the Catholic University of Rio de Janeiro. She left Chile for an involuntary exile in Sweden in 1985. Griffor holds a B.A. in Journalism from Wayne State University and a M.F.A in creative writing from New England College. She and her American husband returned to the United States in 1998. They live in Grosse Pointe Park, Michigan.

== Career ==
Griffor is co-founder of the institute for Creative Writers at Wayne State University and Publisher of Marick Press. Her work has appeared in Passages North, Cerise Press, Washington Square Review, Texas Poetry Review and many others. She is the author of Exiliana (Luna Publications) and House (Mayapple Press). Her latest publication are The Psychiatrist (Eyewear Publishing 2013 and Declassified, 2017). She is honorary consul of Chile in Michigan.

Griffor writes about her homeland of Chile, and her immigrant experiences as an exile in both Sweden and the United States.

== Works ==
Griffor is a bilingual Chilean writer who publishes in Chile and in other places. In Resolana one notices a consistency, a coherence in contrast to the naturalism of our tradition and a cultural formation immersed in the North American lyric, especially Emily Dickinson, Wallace Stevens, Elizabeth Bishop, Marianne Moore – consolidated in hymns to the common and current, in the everyday, in the allusion to the flora and fauna that, without extending in manifest form, uses symbols and literary resources so that the verbal weight asserts itself to her readers. If one has to position Griffor within the recent history of Chilean poetry, her art is closest to poets such as Jorge Teillier, Delia Domínguez and the early Enrique Lihn.

=== Poetry ===
- Exiliana, [Luna Publications] ISBN 978-0978147105 (Toronto, CANADA), 2007
- House, [Mayapple Press] ISBN 978-0932412-539 (Bay City, Michigan, USA), 2007
- The Psychiatrist, [Eyewear Publishing] ISBN 978-1-908998-11-8 (London, UK), 2013
- Resolana, El Taller del Poeta ISBN 978-84-941529-4-8 (Madrid, SPAIN), 2013
- Declassified, , [Eyewear Publishing] ISBN 978-1-911-33549-8 (London, UK), 2017

=== Translation ===
- Canto General, Tupelo Press, Canto General ISBN 978-1-936797-69-1 (Boston, USA), 2016
- Bailando en Odesa, Tupelo Press, Bailando en Odesa ISBN 978-1-936797-93-6 (Boston, USA), 2017

=== Editing ===
- Poetry International, Issue 13/14 2009 Special Double Issue Featuring Chilean Poetry Today [San Diego State University Press] ISBN 1-879691-90-6 (San Diego, California), 2009
