= Joseph Strutt (engraver and antiquary) =

English engraver and antiquary (1749–1802)

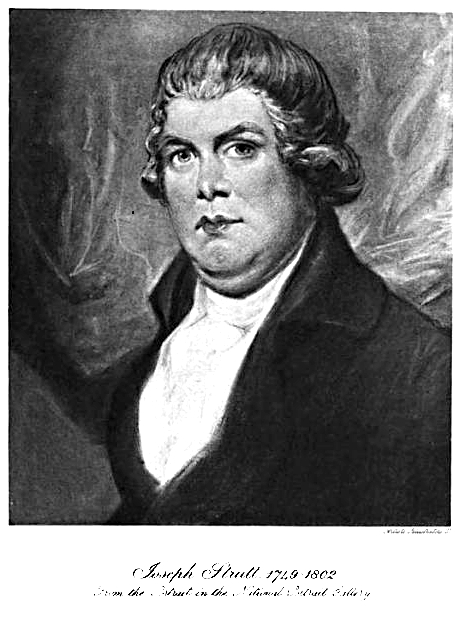
- Frontispiece from the 1802 edition of Strutt's 1801 book The Sports and Pastimes of the People of England from the Earliest Period
- Born: 27 October 1749; Chelmsford, Essex, England
- Died: 16 October 1802 (aged 52)
- Known for: Engraver, antiquary, artist, writer

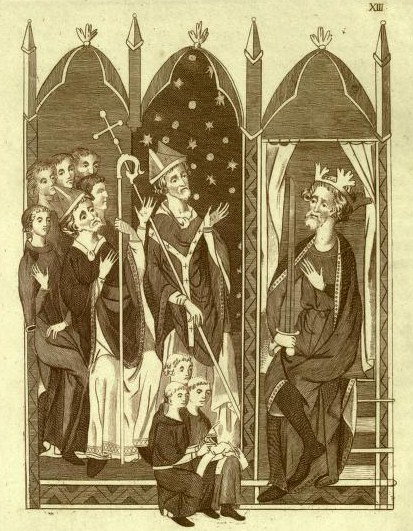
Edward I seated on his throne (drawn and engraved by Strutt, 1773)

Joseph Strutt (27 October 1749 – 16 October 1802) was an English engraver, artist, antiquary, and writer. He is today most significantly known as the earliest and "most important single figure in the investigation of the costume of the past", making him "an influential but totally neglected figure in the history of art in Britain", according to Sir Roy Strong.

== Life and work ==
=== Childhood ===
Strutt was born at Springfield Mill in Chelmsford, Essex, the youngest son of Thomas Strutt and his wife Elizabeth (daughter of John Ingold, miller, of Woodham Walter, near Maldon, Essex) – the mill belonged to his father, a wealthy miller. When he was little more than a year old, his father died, leaving his mother to bring up him and his brother John – the latter, a year or two older, went on to become a physician in Westminster, London. Strutt was educated at King Edward VI Grammar school, Chelmsford (where there is a house named after him), and at the age of fourteen was apprenticed to the engraver William Wynne Ryland.

=== Early career ===
In 1770, he became a student at the Royal Academy in London, and was awarded one of the first silver medals to be presented by the Academy; the following year he took one of the first gold medals. From 1771 he began to study in the reading-room of the British Museum, where he gathered the materials for most of his antiquarian works. His first book, The Regal and Ecclesiastical Antiquities of England, appeared in 1773. For this, the first work of its kind published in England, he drew and engraved from ancient manuscripts representations of kings, costumes, armour, seals, and other objects of interest.

He spent the greater part of his life in similar labours, his art in service to his antiquarian and literary researches. Between 1774 and 1776 he published the three volumes of his Horda Angel-Cynnan: or, A Complete View of the Manners, Customs, Arms, Habits, &c. of the Inhabitants of England, and in 1777–8 the two volumes of his Chronicle of England, both large quarto works, profusely illustrated, and involving a vast amount of research. Of the former a French edition appeared in 1789. The latter Strutt originally intended to extend to six volumes, but he failed to obtain adequate support. At this period he lived partly in London and partly at Chelmsford, but made frequent journeys for the purposes of antiquarian study.

On 16 August 1774 he married Anne Blower, the daughter of Barwell Blower, a dyer from Bocking in Essex, and moved into a house in Duke Street, Portland Place. On her death in September 1778 he wrote an elegiac poem in her memory, published anonymously in 1779; for the next seven years he then devoted his attention to painting, and exhibited nine pictures, mostly classical subjects, at the Royal Academy. From this period date several of his best engravings, executed in the "chalk" or dotted style which had been introduced from the Continent by his master, Ryland.

After 1785 Strutt resumed his antiquarian and literary researches, and brought out his Biographical Dictionary of Engravers (2 vols. 1785–6).

=== Late career ===
In 1790, his health having failed, and having fallen into debt through the dishonesty of a relative, Strutt went to live at Bacon's Farm, Bramfield, Hertfordshire, where he carried on his work as an engraver, and devoted his spare time to the establishment of a Sunday and evening school. At Bramfield he executed several engravings of exceptional merit, including thirteen after designs by Thomas Stothard, published in John Bradford's edition of the Pilgrim's Progress (London, 8vo, 1792). He also gathered the materials for more than one work of fiction (published posthumously), and wrote a satirical romance relating to the French revolution, which exists in manuscript.

In 1795, having paid his debts and his health having improved, Strutt returned to London and resumed his researches. Almost immediately he brought out his Dresses and Habits of the English People (2 vols. 1796–1799), probably the most valuable of his works. This was followed by Sports and Pastimes of the People of England (1801), which was frequently reprinted (its full title is The Sports and Pastimes of the People of England: From the Earliest Period, Including the Rural and Domestic Recreations, May Games, Mummeries, Pageants, Processions and Pompous Spectacles).

Strutt then began a romance entitled Queenhoo Hall, which took its name from after an ancient manor-house at Tewin, near Bramfield. It was intended to illustrate the manners, customs, and habits of the people of England in the 15th century. Strutt did not live to finish it. After his death the publisher John Murray I passed the incomplete manuscript to Walter Scott, who added a final chapter, bringing the narrative to a somewhat premature and inartistic conclusion. It was published in 1808 in four small volumes. Scott admits in the general preface to the later editions of Waverley that his association with Strutt's romance largely suggested to him the publication of his own work.

Strutt died on 16 October 1802 at his house in Charles Street, Hatton Garden, and was buried in St. Andrew's churchyard, Holborn.

His portrait in crayon by Ozias Humphrey, R.A., is in the collection of the National Portrait Gallery.

== Family ==
Strutt left two sons. The elder, Joseph Strutt jnr.(1775–1833), was born on 28 May 1775. He was educated at Christ's Hospital and then trained in Nichols's printing office, but eventually became librarian to the Duke of Northumberland. Besides editing some of his father's posthumous works, he wrote two "Commentaries" on the Holy Scriptures, which ran to several editions. He also contributed a brief sketch of his father's life to Nichols's Literary Anecdotes (1812, v. 665–86). He died at Isleworth, aged 58, on 12 November 1833, leaving a widow and a large family.

Strutt's younger son, William Thomas Strutt (1777–1850), was born on 7 March 1777. He held a position in the bank of England, but won a reputation as a miniature painter. He died at Writtle, Essex, on 22 February 1850, aged 73, leaving several sons, one being William Strutt of Wadhurst, Sussex, who, with his son, Alfred W. Strutt, carried on the artistic profession in this family to the third and fourth generations.

== Legacy ==
Although the amount of Strutt's work as an engraver is small, apart from that appearing in his books, it is of exceptional merit. In the study of those branches of archæology which he followed he was a pioneer, and all later work on the same lines has been built on the foundations he laid. Besides the works mentioned, two incomplete poems by him, entitled "The Test of Guilt" and "The Bumpkin's Disaster", were published in one volume in 1808.
