= Lemon Bay High School =

Coordinates: 26.926729°N 82.332595°W

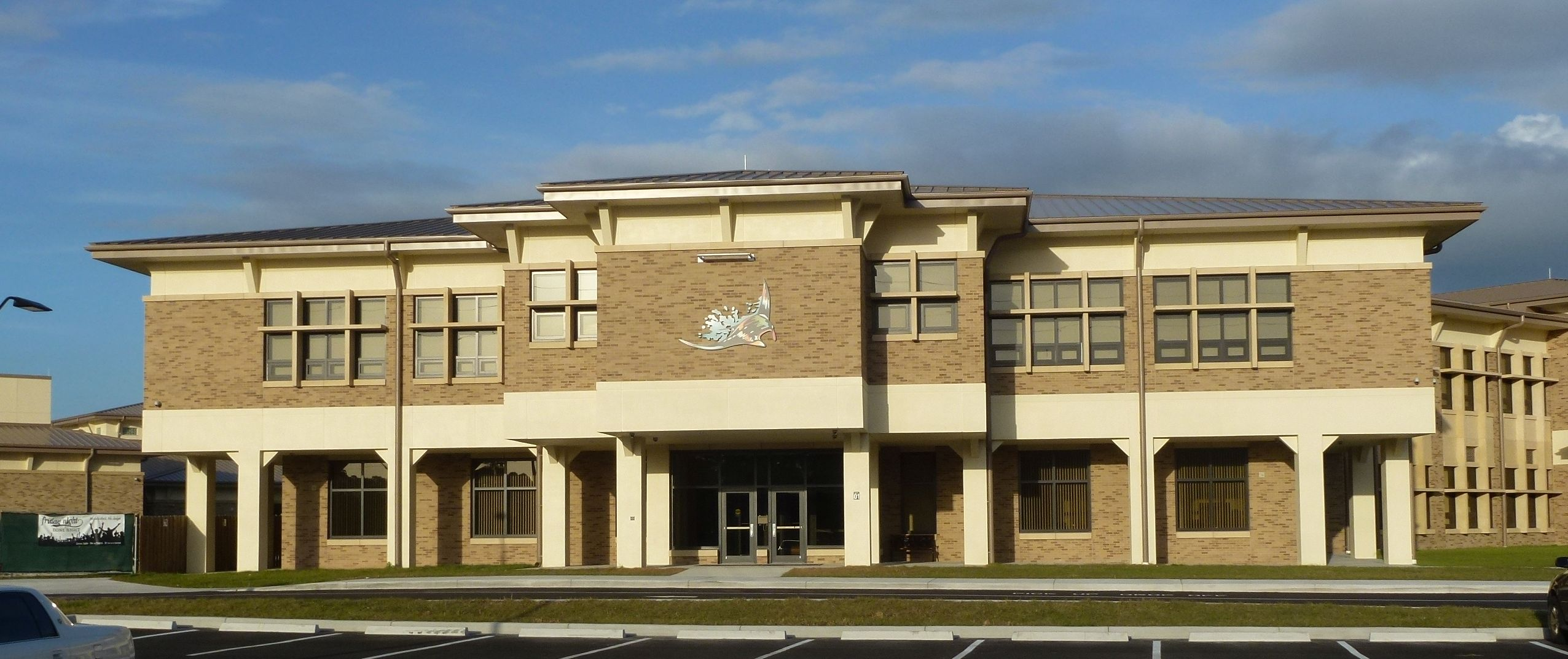
- 2201 Placida Rd, Englewood, FL 34224; Englewood, Florida 34224; United States

Information
- Type: Public
- Motto: "Enter to Learn, Go Forth to Serve"
- Founded: 1972
- School district: Charlotte County Public Schools
- Principal: Robert Murphy
- Teaching staff: 66.00 (FTE)
- Grades: 9-12
- Enrollment: 1,343 (2024-2025)
- Student to teacher ratio: 20.35
- Hours in school day: 7 Class Periods in a day
- Campus: Suburban
- Color: Navy blue Orange
- Mascot: Manta ray
- Website: lemonbayhigh.com
- Last updated: 8/29/24

Lemon Bay High School (LBHS) is a public high school located in Englewood, Florida, USA. It serves grades nine to twelve and is operated by Charlotte County Public Schools.

Lemon Bay High School takes students from Charlotte County, Lee County and Sarasota County because Englewood and Boca Grande are split between the three counties.

== History and campus ==
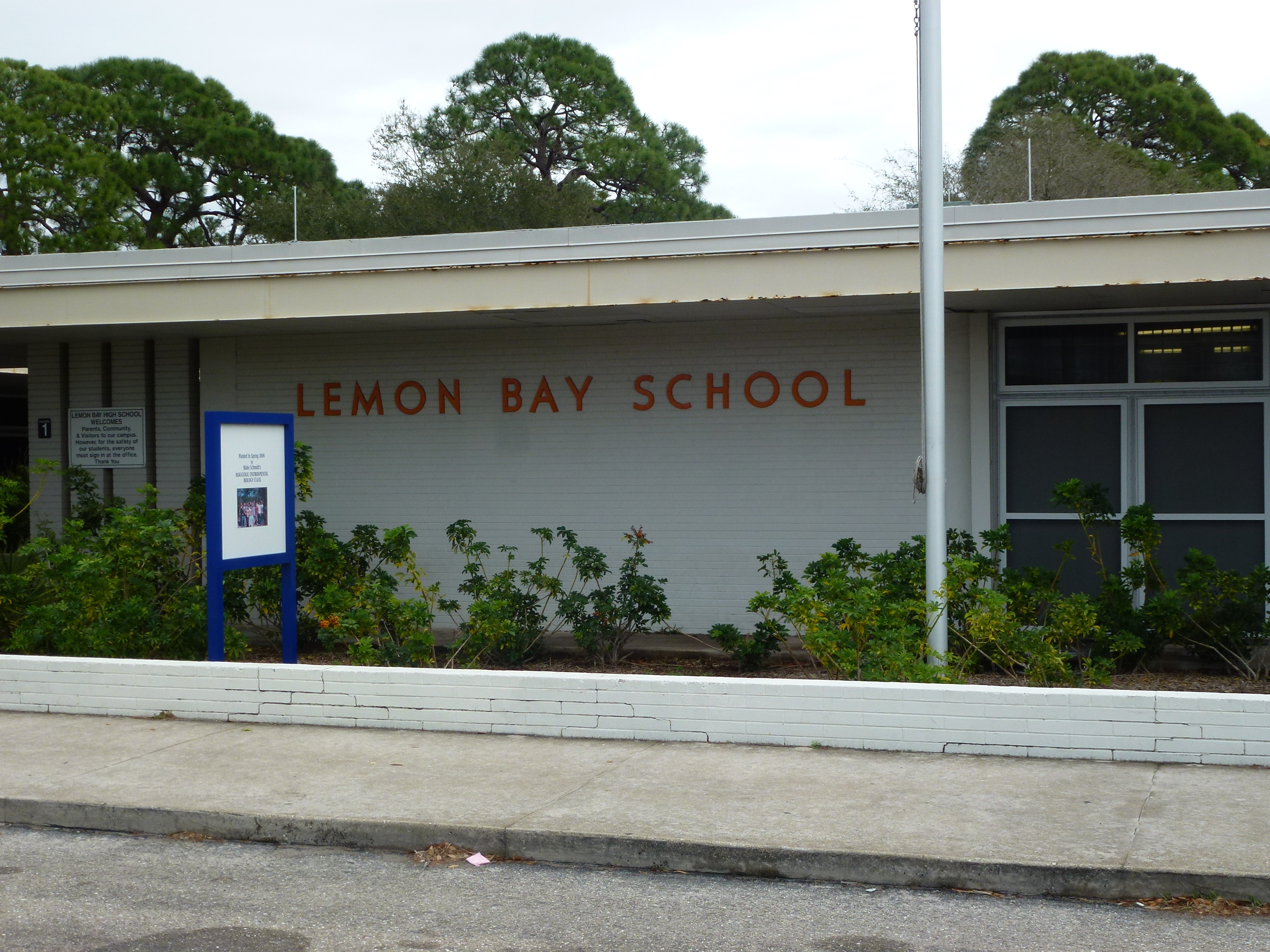
The old building

Prior to the establishment of Lemon Bay High School and Port Charlotte High School, all senior high school students in Charlotte County were bussed to Charlotte High School in Punta Gorda, a 60 to 70 mile commute for some Englewood students. The school, named for Lemon Bay which is adjacent to the campus, opened in 1962 as an elementary school. In 1976, the school became a junior high school, serving grades seven to ten. The school added 11th and 12th grades in 1980/81 after the new building was completed. The first graduating class of seniors was in 1981. The school converted to a senior high school following the construction of L.A. Ainger Middle School in 1983.

A major renovation completed in 1987 gave the school a new administration wing, tennis courts and a track. A larger weight-room and a community swimming pool were added in 1988. In 1991, an auditorium was added and the media center was remodeled in 1993. The school has a track, American football field, baseball field, softball field, tennis courts, weightlifting room and two gymnasia.

The swimming pool was drained and filled with dirt in 2008. Later that year, the remaining concrete rim of the pool was demolished.

The school was featured in the second season of The Principal's Office, a reality television show on TruTv. The assistant principal Tammy Harvey and dean Jon Arritt appeared on the show.

The school was rebuilt using $80 million from stimulus funds.

== Academics ==
Standard English studies, mathematics, science and history courses are core requirements for all students and these four subjects can also be taken as Advanced Placement or honors level courses. Many elective courses are also available, including television production, drafting, information technology, journalism, Spanish language and physical education. As with all schools in Florida, Lemon Bay High School is evaluated yearly by the Florida Department of Education based on standardized testing. LBHS has received grades ranging from A to C, earning an A grade for the 2015–16 school year.

== Extracurricular activities ==
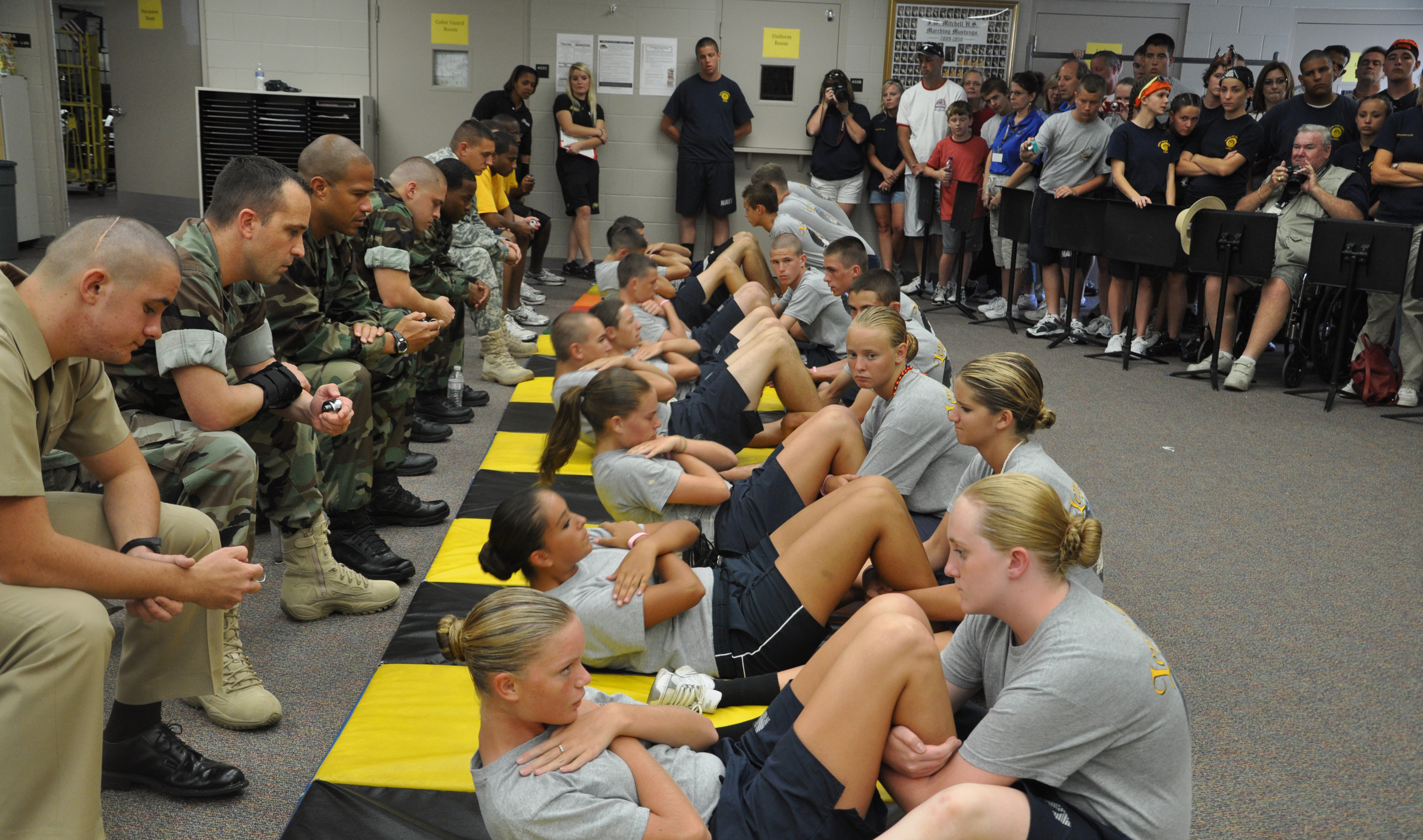
LBHS NJROTC at a competition at J. W. Mitchell High School

The school has a number of clubs and honorary societies available to students.

=== Naval Junior Reserve Officer Training Corps (NJROTC) ===
The NJROTC unit was established and is maintained by the United States Navy as a citizenship program focusing on developing students' leadership characteristics. Students in NJROTC wear a modified U.S. Navy uniform once a week and must pass a physical education test once every nine weeks as part of the curriculum. Apart from traditional classwork, students are encouraged to participate in a number of extracurricular activities, including an athletic team, academic team, drill team, color guard and a number of community service organizations including the American Legion and Rotary Club. Student leaders are in direct control of the affairs of the unit and are supervised by two retired United States Navy instructors. The unit is a part of NJROTC Area Seven, which includes the majority of schools with NJROTC programs in the southeast United States.

=== Model United Nations ===
The Model United Nations club on campus focuses on involving students in a moot form of international debate. The club participates in a number of competitions against schools statewide and has achieved success in a number of these competitions, including at the University of Florida, University of Central Florida, Florida Gulf Coast University and the Florida High School Model United Nations (FHSMUN). The school was a founding member of the competition held at Florida Gulf Coast University, the Southwest Florida Model United Nations Competition. The club also participates in charitable causes.

==== Theater arts ====
The theater program allows students to participate in a number of productions by enrolling in an elective class. The school has achieved success at district, state and national level.

==== Music programs ====
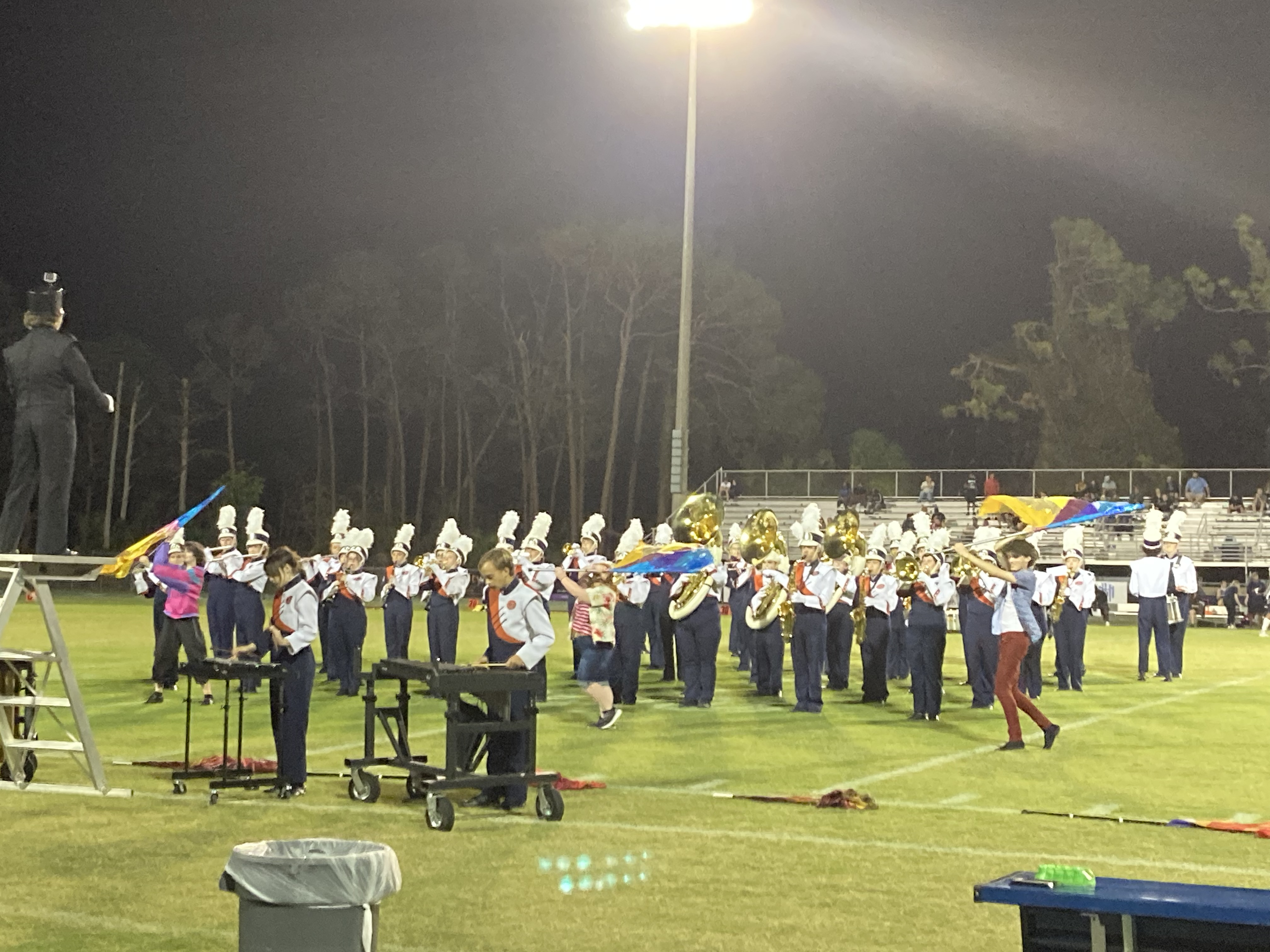
Marching Mantas performing during half time at a football game

The school's band is made up of a marching band, symphonic band, percussion ensemble and jazz band. The marching band, known as the Marching Mantas, performs a half-time show during school football games and competes against other schools at statewide competitions. The symphonic band consists of only woodwind, brass and percussion instruments, with no string section or string players participating. Both the symphonic and jazz bands are rated on their progress and quality of performance each year by their district Florida Bandmaster's Association.

Students may participate in the symphonic and jazz bands by enrolling in an elective class and may participate in the marching band and percussion ensemble as extracurricular activities without a required class.

The Marching Mantas participated in the Orange Bowl in Miami, Florida, in January 2007.

=== Athletics ===
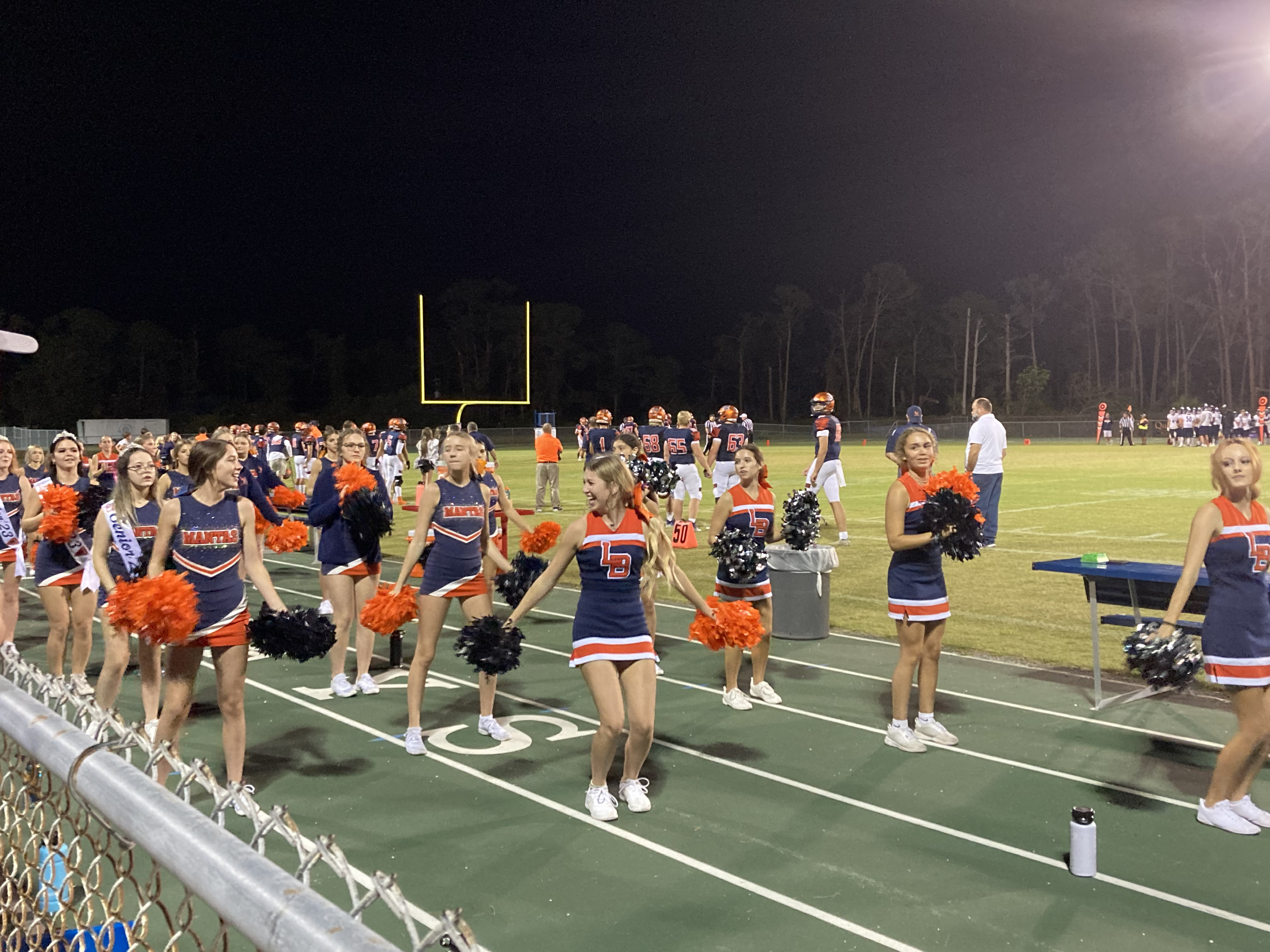
Lady Manta cheerleaders in 2022

Fall season sports at LBHS include junior varsity and varsity swimming, American football, golf, volleyball, cheerleading, and cross-country running. During the winter season, sports include soccer, basketball and wrestling. Students can participate in baseball, softball, tennis, track and field, and weightlifting.

- Wrestling has won two state championships, in 1998 and 1999.

== Notable alumni ==
- J. D. Barker – author of numerous best-selling suspense novels, graduated in 1989
- Cherie DeVaux - first female trainer to win the Kentucky Derby.
- Danny Duncan, prank and comedy YouTuber
- Denise Amber Lee – was kidnapped, raped, and murdered on January 17, 2008, despite calls to 9-1-1, leading to the passing of legislation to require more training for 911 operators
- Caroline Maun – professor, author, poet, lyricist and musician, graduated in 1986
- Felicia Spencer – professional mixed martial artist
