= Rotonda West, Florida =

Rotonda West, Florida Rotonda
- Unincorporated community CDP
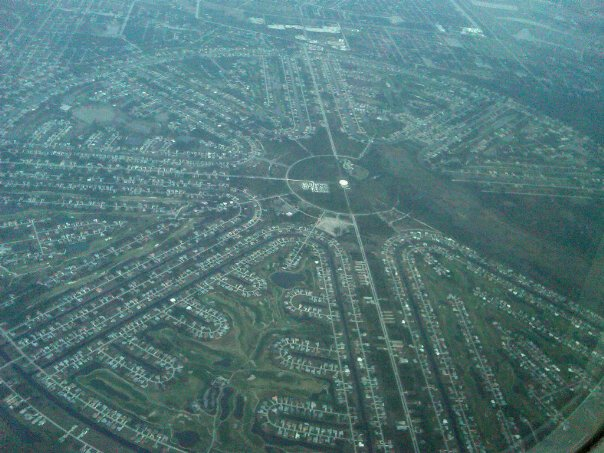
- The residential development project that contains most of the town.

- Location in Charlotte County and the state of Florida
- Coordinates: 26°53′09″N 82°16′10″W
- Country: United States
- State: Florida
- County: Charlotte

Area
  - Unincorporated community CDP: 11.54 sq mi (29.88 km^{2})
  - Land: 10.66 sq mi (27.60 km^{2})
  - Water: 0.88 sq mi (2.27 km^{2})

Population (2020)
  - Unincorporated community CDP: 10,114
  - Density: 949.0/sq mi (366.42/km^{2})
  - Urban: 15,600
- Time zone: Eastern Time
- ZIP code: 33947
- Area code: 941
- FIPS code: 12-61937
- Website: https://www.rotondawest.org

Rotonda West is an unincorporated, deed-restricted planned community situated in Charlotte County, Florida, United States. The 2020 U.S. Census Bureau lists it as the Rotonda census-designated place, with a population of 10,114, up from 8,759 at the 2010 census. It is part of the Punta Gorda, Florida Metropolitan Statistical Area, included in the North Port-Bradenton, Florida Combined Statistical Area. It was developed and named Rotonda West by Cavanagh Communities Corporation, which purchased the land in 1969.

The developer also purchased land in southern Martin County and northern Palm Beach County for a second project to be named "Rotonda East." The land selected for that development was swamp land, located north of West Indiantown Road, south of the Tailwinds Airport, west of Interstate 95 and east of Mack Dairy Road. It was not considered wise to drain those wetlands due to changing views on the ecological value of wetlands, and the Army Corps of Engineers refused a permit, so the Rotonda East project was abandoned.

== History ==
The land was first part of a large cattle ranch owned by brothers William and Alfred Vanderbilt, direct descendants of Cornelius Vanderbilt. They purchased the land in 1952 and sold a portion in 1969 that became Rotonda West. The development of Rotonda West began in 1970. The layout of Rotonda West mimics temporary World War II airfields in Southern Florida, laid out like a wagon wheel. The choice of the airfield layout as the pattern for Rotonda West gives it a flavor of Florida history, however there was no airfield at this location prior to development, while the format was used at many locations, such as Forman Field NOLF, a training site for new pilots. The circular pattern used a configuration of four 3,000 ft (914.4 m) paved runways, oriented along the cardinal directions of the compass, along with a circular taxiway running along the outer boundary of the runways. This allowed easier landing maneuvers of student pilots, before having to learn how to make crosswind landings. Forman NOLF is now the location of Nova Southeastern University at Fort Lauderdale, Florida.

The circular nature of Rotonda West was developed after Walt Disney introduced his "City of Tomorrow" called EPCOT on national television October 27, 1966, two months before Disney's death.

This area was one of many in Florida hit by Hurricane Ian in September 2022.

== Layout ==
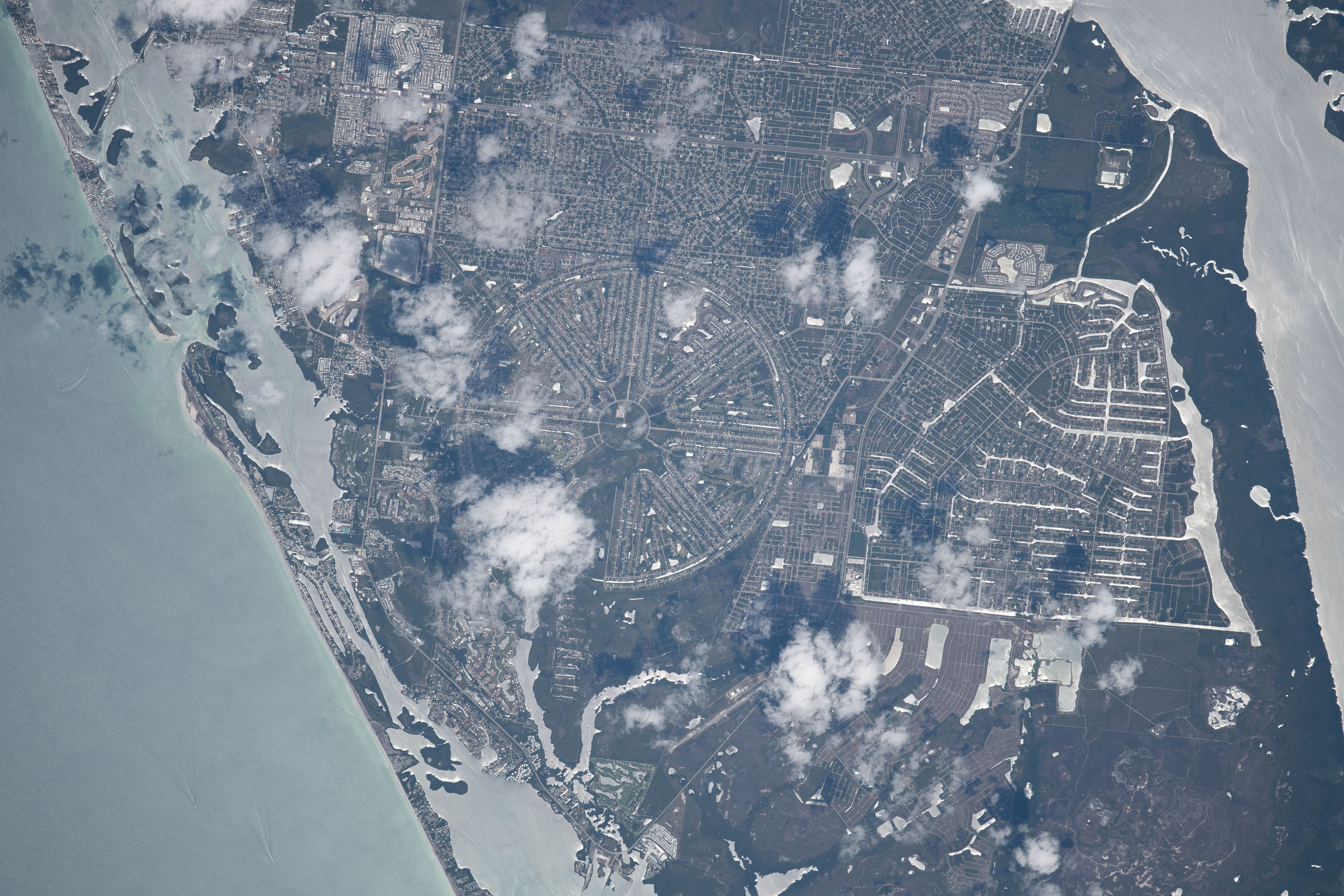
Rotonda West from the International Space Station

The Rotonda community is laid out into eight segments with a central hub, called the Rotonda Community Park and Preserve, that is a 1 1/2-mile (2.4 km) circumference. Within the hub there is a playground, tennis courts, and a walking path, while most of the hub (including a proposed "space needle") is undeveloped. There is also a designated area where people can pay to park boats, trailers, and RVs. There is also a water treatment plant next to the RV & Boat Parking.

The approach was considered modern at the time, inspired by the garden city movement of urban planning, and incorporates a green belt layout throughout the property.

Parade Circle encircles the central hub, while Rotonda Circle and Boundary Boulevard encircle the outer edge. All three of these beltway roads are not contiguous. Rotonda Boulevard connects Parade Circle to Rotonda Circle and Boundary Boulevard, labeled Rotonda Boulevard North, West and East, and link the community to outside neighborhoods and surrounding communities. Rotonda Boulevard South runs along the western edge of Pine Valley and the neighborhood is undeveloped, connecting only to Boundary Boulevard and Rotonda Circle in the south.

Seven of the eight subdivision segments have neighborhood names; Oakland Hills, Pebble Beach, Pinehurst, Broadmoor, Long Meadow, White Marsh and Pine Valley. There is one segment that is undeveloped between Oakland Hills, which is the oldest, and Pine Valley in the southwest segment. This undeveloped segment was to be called Saint Andrews, but due to wetlands conservation efforts, was not established. All but one segment, Broadmoor, incorporate a golf course between the houses, and Oakland Hills, Pinehurst, Long Meadow, and Pine Valley share a common street layout, while Pebble Beach, Broadmoor, and White Marsh incorporate cul-de-sac street layouts. The five golf courses are called Pinemoor, The Palms, The Hills, The Links and the Long Marsh, which offers 27 holes to play that are integrated into the White Marsh and Pine Valley subdivisions, while the others offer 18. Broadmoor neighborhood has twelve interconnected ponds for shallow watercraft, while the other neighborhoods have shallow canals that are linked to the other segments, and pass underneath bridges on Rotonda Boulevard and Rotonda Circle. Residents of Pine Valley do not have an inner connecting road to Parade Circle, while the other neighborhoods do, and the outer boundary roads, and don't connect Oakland Hills and Pine Valley in the southwest.

All of the homes are single-family bungalows with an attached garage, and there are no multi-family dwellings or shopping centers within the campus.

According to the United States Census Bureau, the Rotonda CDP has a total area of 11.5 square miles (29.9 km^{2}), of which 10.7 square miles (27.6 km^{2}) is land and 0.89 square miles (2.3 km^{2}), or 7.74%, is water.

== Endorsement and promotion ==
In 1972, the original developer Cavanagh Communities Corporation promoted available sites for sale on the Superstars sports competition show on ABC-TV in February 1973. Later Ed McMahon was a paid spokesman for the property, and advertised the community at national events, later becoming Vice President of Cavanagh Corporation. He was given a house with close proximity to a golf course at 37 Golfview Rd in the Oakland Hills neighborhood, which was used for entertaining celebrities at the Superstars competitions.

== Climate ==
Located in southwest Florida on the Gulf Coast, the weather usually stays relatively mild. In the summer, it is common for temperatures to reach the low to mid-90s, however, this is tempered by sea breezes from the Gulf. At night in the summer, temperatures quickly drop to the low to mid 70s. In the winter, hard freezes are extremely rare. It is more common to have frost on the ground briefly in pre-dawn hours in the winter season, however it quickly melts shortly after sunrise. Temperatures average 50 - 70 degrees during the winter, with thunderstorms in the summer, while the dry season is in the winter.

== Demographics ==
Historical population
Census	Pop.	Note	%±
1990	3,576		—
2000	6,574		83.8%
2010	8,759		33.2%
2020	10,114		15.5%
U.S. Decennial Census

As of the census of 2010, there were 8,759 people, 4,414 households, and 2,925 families residing in the CDP. The population density was 823.0 inhabitants per square mile (317.8/km^{2}). There were 6,581 housing units at an average density of 618.5/mi^{2} (238.8/km^{2}). The racial makeup of the CDP was 97.3% White, 1.0% African American, 0.1% Native American, 0.7% Asian, 0.3% from other races, and 0.50% from two or more races. Hispanic or Latino people of any race made up 1.9% of the population.

There were 4,414 households, out of which 10.6% had children under the age of 18 living with them, 59.5% were married couples living together, 5.0% had a female householder with no husband present, and 33.7% were non-families. 19.9% of all households had someone living alone who was 65 years of age or older. The average household size was 1.98 and the average family size was 2.38.

In the CDP, the population was spread out, with 10.3% under the age of 18, 3.0% from 18 to 24, 10.3% from 25 to 44, 31.8% from 45 to 64, and 44.6% who were 65 years of age or older. The median age was 62.9 years. For every 100 females, there were 91.4 males. For every 100 females age 18 and over, there were 89.6 males.

According to the 2017 American Community Survey, the median income for a household in the CDP was $47,586, and the median income for a family was $53,680. The per capita income for the CDP was $28,391. About 3.1% of families and 5.5% of the population were below the poverty line, including 2.9% of those under age 18 and 4.3% of those age 65 or over.

== Public schools ==
Rotonda West falls within the Charlotte County Public School district. Two schools are adjacent to the Rotonda West area: L.A. Ainger Middle School and Vineland Elementary School. The high school located near Rotonda West is Lemon Bay High School. Both schools have received an A from the state more than five years in a row. All schools are located outside of the community.
