= Danny Duncan (YouTuber) =

American YouTuber (born 1992)

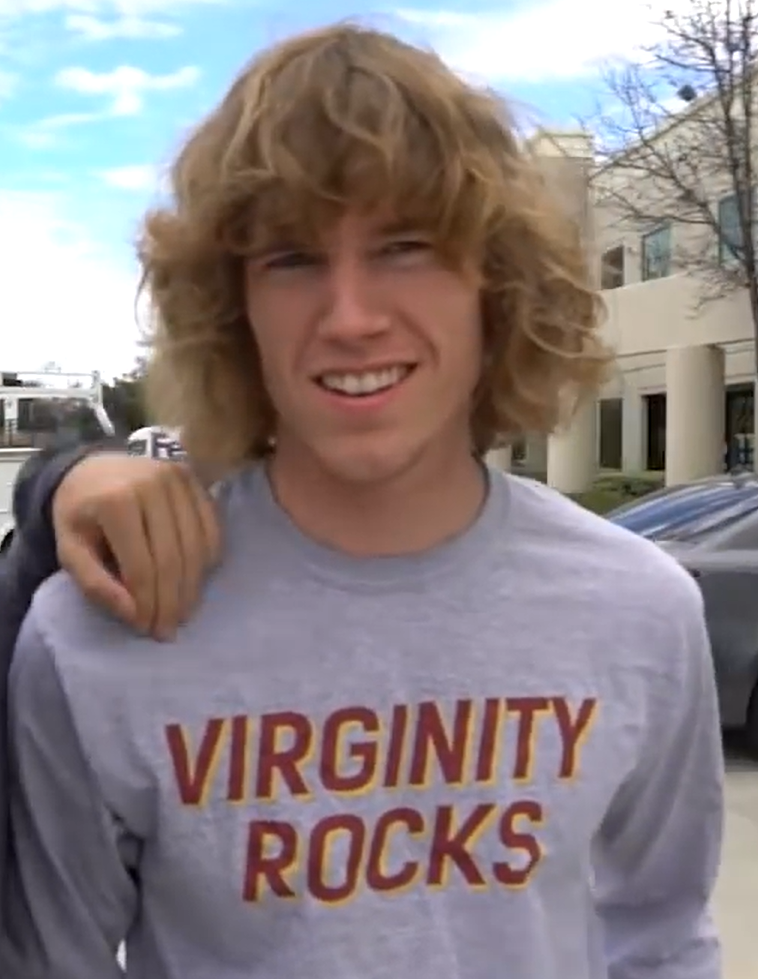
- Duncan in 2018
- Born: Daniel Duncan; July 27, 1992 (age 34); Englewood, Florida
- Years active: 2014–present

YouTube information
- Channel: Danny Duncan
- Genres: Comedy; prank
- Subscribers: 8.15 million
- Views: 2.28 billion
- Last updated: March 13, 2026
- Website: www.dannyduncan69.com

Daniel Duncan (born July 27, 1992) is an American YouTuber, known for his often crude prank and comedy videos.

== Early life ==
Daniel Duncan was born on July 27, 1992, in Englewood, Florida. He graduated from Lemon Bay High School in 2010. Duncan dropped out of college and worked at Walgreens before later moving to Los Angeles at 22 to pursue a media career.

== Career ==
Prior to becoming a YouTuber, Duncan helped train and stretch professional athletes and celebrities, leading to him coming into contact with Jason Lee. Lee thought that Duncan was funny and recommended that he get into acting, saying that he should start a YouTube channel to build a fanbase. Duncan has said that his hero is Daniel Tosh.

In 2017, Duncan began wearing shirts with the text "Virginity Rocks" on them. After his audience embraced it, he began to sell merch displaying it, which has led to students being suspended for wearing the shirt in Oregon, Wisconsin, and Missouri. In 2018, he embarked on the Virginity Rocks Tour, a 20-city, nationwide, unscripted performance that included miscellaneous activities.

In April 2021, while Duncan was meeting with fans at the Cielo Vista Mall in El Paso, Texas, a large group began running toward an unnamed social media personality in the mall, causing some people to yell "active shooter" and leading to the mall being evacuated. The 2019 El Paso Walmart shooting had occurred at the Walmart adjacent to the mall less than two years prior. No one was injured in the 2021 incident, and Duncan was initially accused of arranging the event as a prank.

In August 2022, Duncan became the chief creative officer and co-owner of frozen yogurt company 16 Handles. In December, he planned a mini-golf course for his hometown of Englewood and was able to have it approved by the county. In January 2023, he released his own Chia Pet and in March 2024, released a brand of energy drinks, Matador Energy.
