= John Collins (poet) =

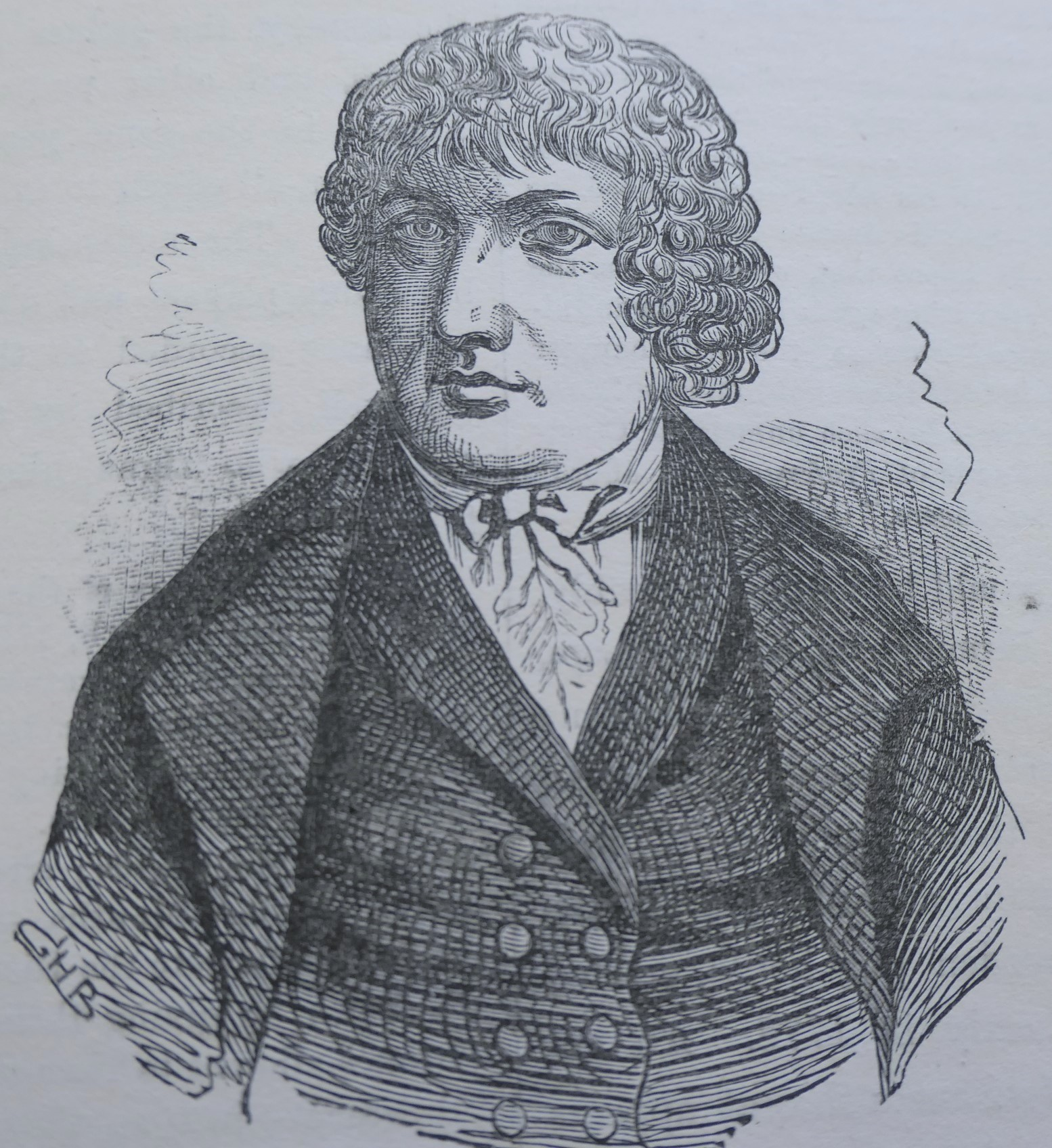
- Born: 1742
- Died: 2 May 1808 (aged 65–66)

John Collins (1742 – 2 May 1808) was an English entertainer and poet from Birmingham.

== Life ==
He was born at Bath, and from some lines in his own collection of poems, entitled 'Scripscrapologia,' he would seem to have been a tailor's son. He was bred up to the business of a staymaker, but an occupation of that nature ill accorded with his disposition, and he very early in life made his appearance on the Bath stage, and filled many parts there, extending to 'tragedy, genteel comedy, low comedy, and old men and country boys in farces and operas,' a range of character which could not have been uniformly successful.

In October 1764, he appeared at the theatre in Smock Alley, Dublin, as young Mirabel in the 'Inconstant,' and 'proved a very respectable acquisition to the Irish stage.' In Ireland, as at Bath, the characters assigned to him were of necessity often varied, but he seems to have always played with credit, and to have made his mark in comic opera.

It is stated in the 'Memoirs of Charles Lee Lewes,' i. 79-85, that Collins played Captain Plume at Covent Garden Theatre 'many years ago,' but that a severe cold prevented him from obtaining the success which his talents deserved, and drove him from the London stage into the country. At a later period he returned to London 'with a very entertaining evening's amusement called "The Brush," composed of pleasant old theatrical stories well told, with humorous songs well written by him-self.' His entertainment had different names at different periods.

Dr. Thomas Campbell of Clogher, who paid a visit to London in 1775, went one evening ' to hear Collins lecture upon oratory at the Devil tavern,' and noted in his diary that ' the fellow displayed good enunciation and good sense. His ridicule of the Scots, Welsh, and Irish was passing well'. At Belfast, in 1776, the performance was styled 'The Elements of Modern Oratory; ' at another date the title of 'The Brush ' was given to it; and at a still later year the name was changed to 'The Evening Brush.' In substance, however, the entertainment never changed; it was from first to last a medley of 'story, song, and sentiment.' During the winter of 1791-2 Collins gave his performance at the Lyceum Theatre in London on fifty-two nights, and with that striking tribute to his popularity he quit the London stage.

In January 1793, he was amusing Birmingham audiences by his recitations, and in that year he was so far settled in that town as to occupy a house in Great Brook Street, Ashted. By these performances he obtained a 'well-earned easy competency,' and it must have been with some portion of his gains that he acquired an interest with a Mr. Swinney in a newspaper called The Birmingham Chronicle. Many of the poetic effusions of Collins were inspired by local events, and many of them were published in his paper, from the pages of which, as he complains, they were reproduced without acknowledgment. While he was resident in Birmingham his niece, Miss Brent, lived with him.

Collins suffered in the spring of 1808 from a severe illness, but his death at Birmingham on 2 May 1808, in his sixty-sixth year, was sudden.

== Works ==
The best-known of the poems of Collins, most of which are of unusual excellence for the date of their composition, are 'To-morrow,' 'The Golden Days of good Queen Bess,' 'Date obolum Belisario,' and ' Ben Block,' the last of which was printed in 'Notes and Queries' for 17 April 1886, p. 310; and the chief merit of his performances lay in the feeling with which he sang his lyric compositions, the 'rare perfection ' of his musical expression being universally acknowledged. The original manuscript of 'The Brush,' formerly in the possession of Thomas Bell and William Pinkerton, is now the property of Mr. Samuel Timmins of Birmingham. It was printed at Newcastle in 1800.

In 1804 there was printed at Birmingham a volume of the poems of Collins, with the queer title of 'Scripscrapologia, or Collins's doggerel dish of all sorts. To it is prefixed a portrait of the author, followed by an apostrophe to Mr. Meyler, bookseller and printer in the Grove, Bath. His name is found on the title-pages of two other works: 1. 'Lecture on Heads [by G. A. Stevens] as delivered by Mr. Palmer at the Royalty Theatre. . . . The Golden Days of good Queen Bess, written by Mr. Collins/ n. d. [1787], 12 pages. 2. 'The Theatrical Banquet, or the Actor's Budget. Together with Collins's "Evening Brush." [Compiled] by W. Oxberry,' 1809, 2 vols., the portion belonging to Collins filling pp. 3–44 of vol. ii.

== Family ==
His wife, who was distinguished for her beauty, painted likenesses in profile at the price of half a guinea each, 'frame and glass included.' She suffered from cancer in the breast and died from the effects of an operation. They had no family.
