= Charlotte County Public Schools =

School district in Southwest Florida

Coordinates: 27.0055°N 82.1445°W

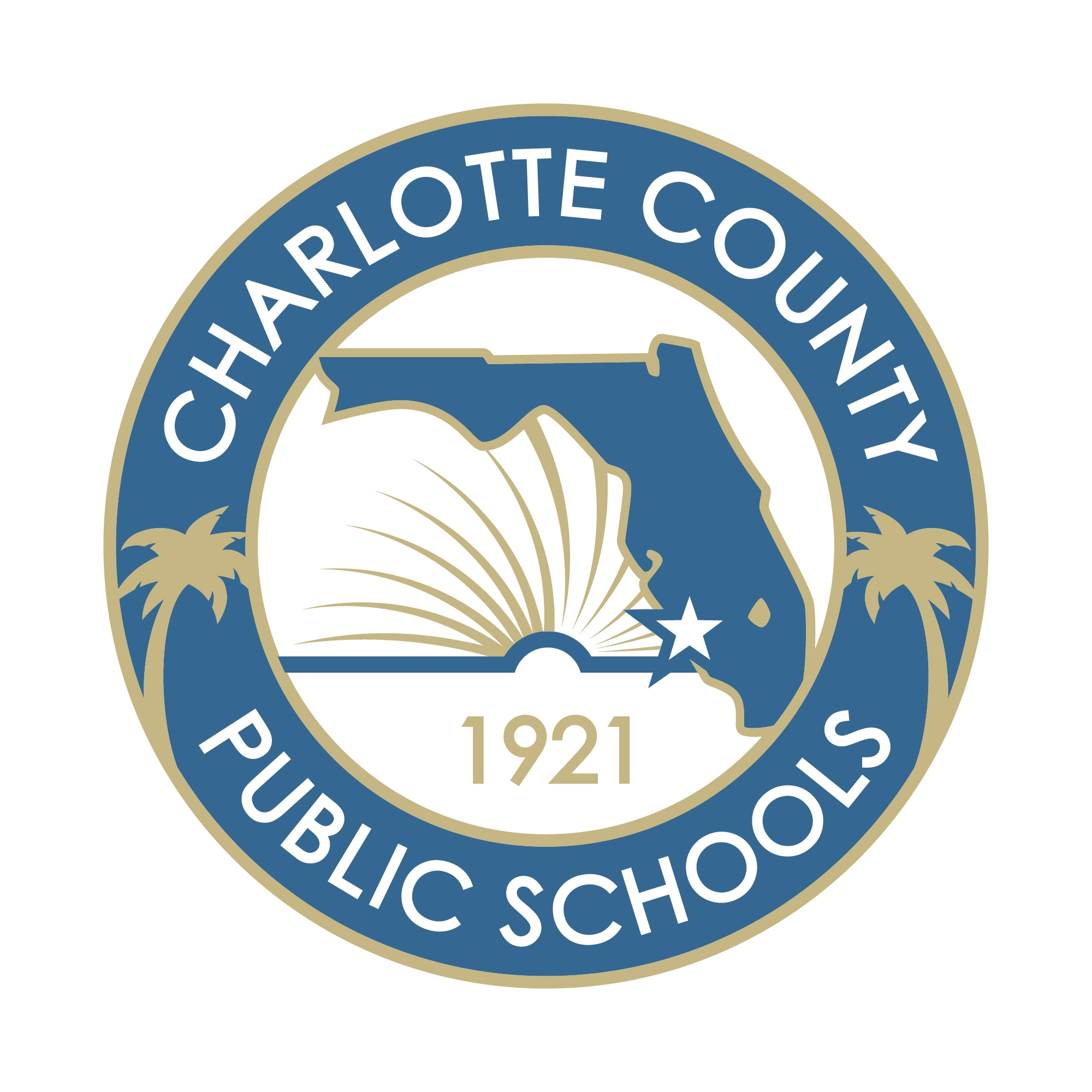

Address
- 1445 Education Way Port Charlotte, Florida, 33948; United States

District information
- Type: Public
- Motto: "Setting Standards for Student Success!"
- Grades: K-12 + specialty education centers
- Superintendent: Mark Vianello
- Asst. superintendent(s): Dr. Adrienne McElroy, Bob Bedford, Dr. Michael Desjardins, Jeff Harvey
- Business administrator: Marcus Allen, chief financial officer
- Chair of the board: John LaClair
- Enrollment: 17,838

Other information
- Website: http://www.yourcharlotteschools.net/

Charlotte County Public Schools (CCPS) operates all public K-12 schools in Charlotte County, Florida, United States. It covers Port Charlotte, Punta Gorda, Englewood, Rotonda West, Babcock Ranch, and surrounding areas. It operates ten elementary schools, four middle schools, three high schools, and six specialty education centers.

== History ==
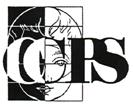
Former logo of CCPS, used during the 1990s

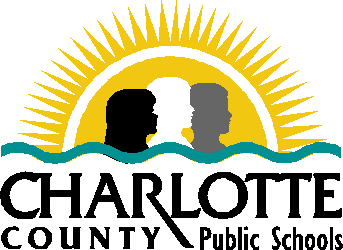
Logo used from the late 1990s to 2023

The roots of the district are traced back to 1888, when the first school building in the area was built on the corner of Marion Street and Harvey Street in Punta Gorda. At the time, African Americans in Charlotte County were not allowed to attend a white school. The first black school was built in 1893; black students were not introduced into the white schools in Charlotte County until 1964. Accelerated growth in the community beginning in 1950 resulted in the rapid expansion of the school district. New, larger schools started popping up all over the county much more rapidly than before.

== List of schools ==
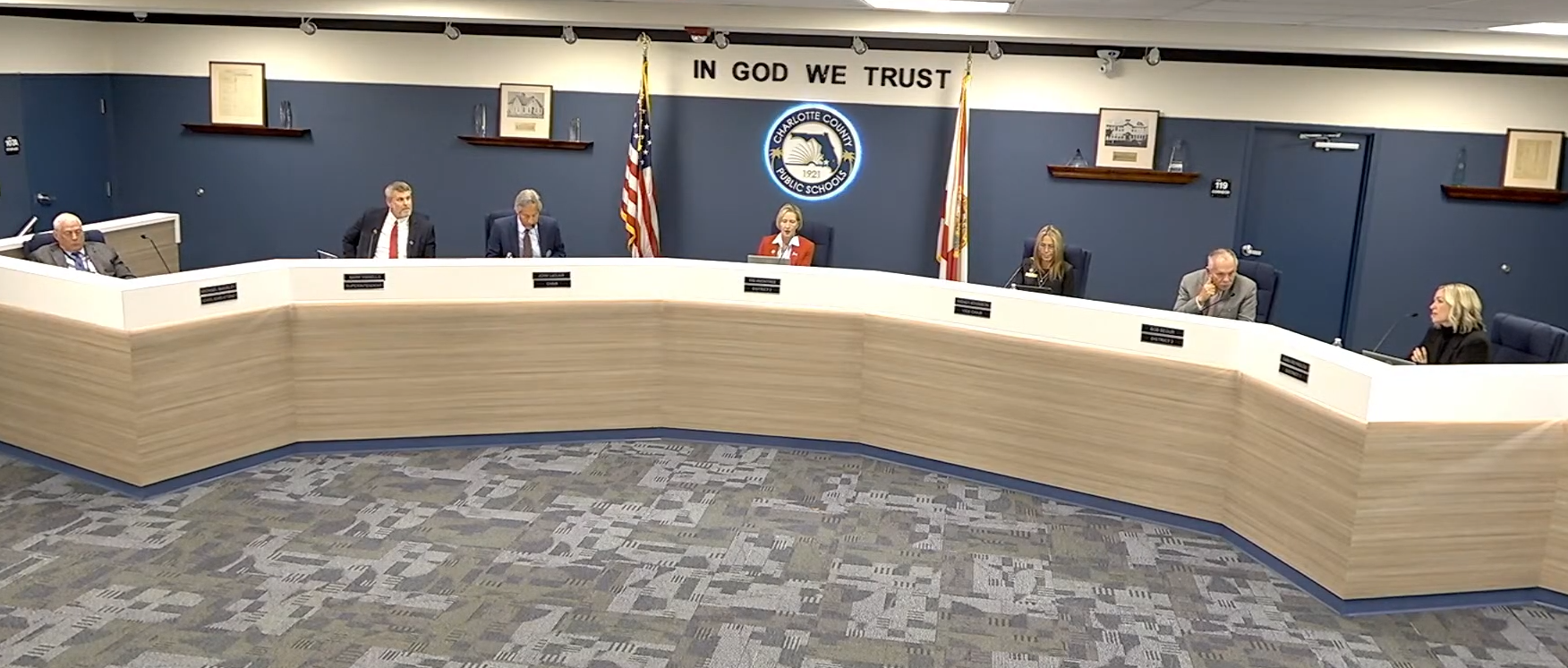
November 2025 public meeting of the Charlotte County School Board at district headquarters in Port Charlotte

=== Elementary schools ===
- Deep Creek Elementary School is a K-5 school located in Port Charlotte with 720 students. Its principal is James Vernon. Its mascot is a bear cub. Its school colors are blue and gold. It is classified as an "A" school.
- East Elementary School is K-5 school located in Punta Gorda with 500 students. Its principal is Dr. Lori Carr. Its mascot is an eagle. Its school colors are red and white] It has earned an "A" rating and has been considered an AYP school for three years.
- Kingsway Elementary School is a K-5 school located in Port Charlotte with 780 students. Its principal is Lori Davis. Its mascot is a cougar. Its school colors are blue and white. It is classified as an "A" school.
- Liberty Elementary School is a K-5 school located in Port Charlotte with 835 students. Its principal is Caralyn Whaley. Its mascot is a Patriot. Its colors are red, white, and blue. It is classified as an "A" school.
- Meadow Park Elementary School is a K-5 school located in Port Charlotte with 764 students. Its principal is Lauren Elek. Its mascot is an alligator. Its colors are green and gold. It has been considered an "A" school for five years. It has earned the "You Make a Difference" award.
- Myakka River Elementary School is a K-5 school located in Port Charlotte with 660 students. Its principal is Grace Shepard. Its mascot is a manatee. It is classified as an "A" school. It was one of 99 schools nationwide recognized by Richard W. Riley as a Title 1 school for offering outstanding programs for disadvantaged students.
- Neil Armstrong Elementary School is a K-5 school located in Port Charlotte with 557 students. Its principal is Angie Taillon. Its mascot is an Astro. Its colors are red and white. It enforces a school uniform policy. It is classified as an "A" school. It is a distinguished school classified as AYP.
- Peace River Elementary School is a K-5 school located in Port Charlotte with 475 students. Its principal is Bertie Alvarez. Its mascot is a panther. It enforces a school uniform policy. It is classified as an "A" school.
- Sallie Jones Elementary School is a K-5 school located in Punta Gorda with 700 students. Its principal is Carmel Kisiday. Its mascot is a tiger. Its colors are hunter green, red, navy blue, white and khaki. It enforces a school uniform policy. It is classified as an "A" school.
- Vineland Elementary School is a K-5 school located in Rotonda West with 900 students. Its principal is Laura C. Blunier. Its mascot is a great blue heron. Its colors are blue and white. It is classified as an "A" school.

=== Middle schools ===
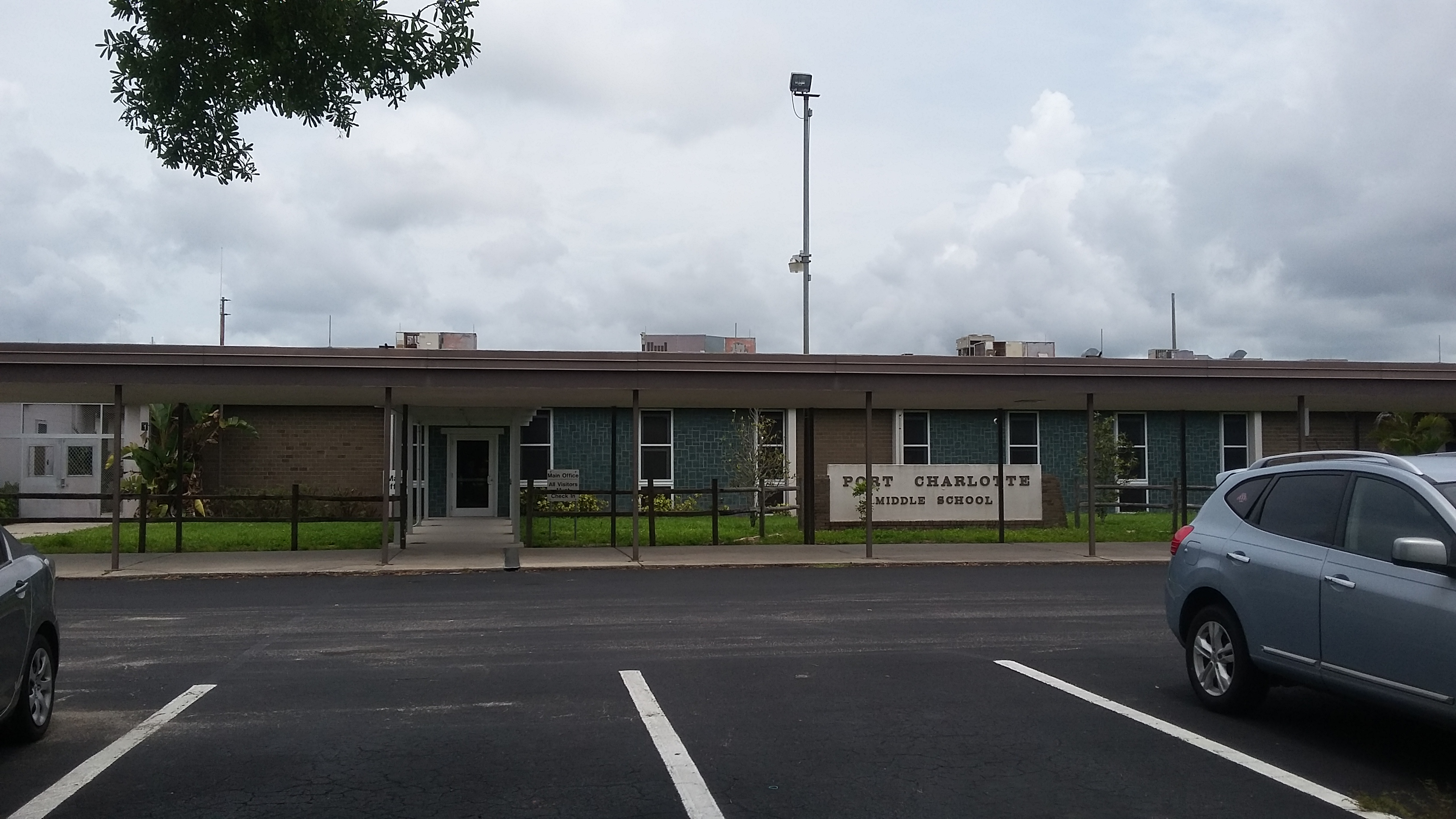
Port Charlotte Middle School, a twin of the original Punta Gorda Middle School and the oldest surviving school building in Charlotte County

- L.A. Ainger Middle School is a middle school located in Rotonda West with 1115 students. Its principal is Bruce Fourman. Its mascot is a cougar. It has been classified as an "A" school for seven years.
- Murdock Middle School is a middle school located in Port Charlotte with 950 students. It was beginning to be constructed in 1986 and open for its first official school year in 1988. Its principal is Lyman Welton. Its mascot is a mariner. The school has earned the status of a Red Carpet School and a Blue Ribbon School. It is also classified as an "A" school.
- Port Charlotte Middle School is a middle school located in Port Charlotte with 1030 students. Its principal is Tara Whisenant . Its mascot is a terrier. It is classified as an "A" school. Its main building, built in 1970, was identified as a threatened historic structure by the Florida Trust for Historic Preservation in 2023 after sustaining damage from Hurricane Ian.
- Punta Gorda Middle School is a middle school located in Punta Gorda with 1050 students. Its principal is Justina Dionisio. Its mascot is an eagle. Its colors are red and blue.

=== High schools ===
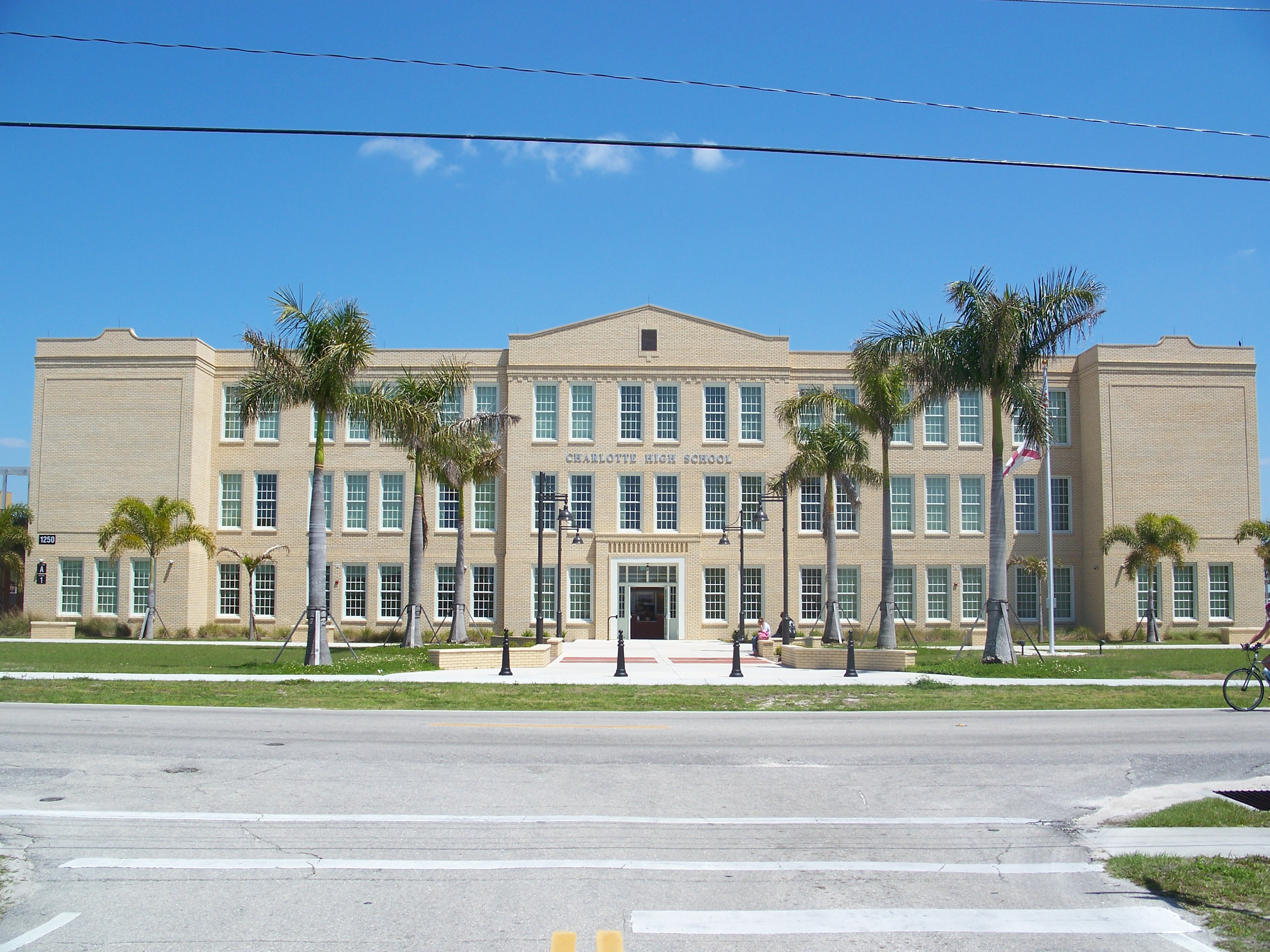
Charlotte High School

- Babcock High School is a charter high school in Babcock Ranch. Its mascot is a trailblazer.
- Charlotte High School is a high school located in Punta Gorda with 2,006 students. Its mascot is a tarpon. Its colors are blue and gold.
- Florida SouthWestern Collegiate High School is a charter high school in Punta Gorda.
- Lemon Bay High School is a high school located in Englewood with 1,560 students. Its mascot is a manta ray. Its colors are navy blue and orange.
- Port Charlotte High School is a high school located in Port Charlotte with 2,250 students. Its mascot is a pirate. Its colors are red, white, and black.

=== Notable staff members ===
==== Port Charlotte High School ====
- Doug Dunakey, former professional golfer in PGA; became golf coach after retirement
- Mark Ivey, college football coach; previously coached for PCHS

=== Notable alumni ===
==== Charlotte High School ====
- Jeff Corsaletti (class of 2001), professional baseball player in MiLB
- Matthew LaPorta (class of 2003), professional baseball player in MLB; 2008 Summer Olympian
- Burton Lawless (class of 1970), professional football player in NFL
- Tommy Murphy, professional baseball player in MLB

==== Port Charlotte High School ====
- Chris Demakes, professional musician with Less Than Jake, a ska punk band
- Vinnie Fiorello, professional musician with Less Than Jake, a ska punk band
- John Hall (class of 1992), professional football player in NFL
- Anthony Hargrove (class of 2001), professional football player in NFL
- David Holmberg (class of 2009), professional baseball pitcher in MLB
- Asher Levine (class of 2006), fashion designer

==== Lemon Bay High School ====
- J. D. Barker (class of 1989), author
- Denise Amber Lee (class of 2004), kidnapping and murder victim
