= Daniel Duncan (physician) =

Scottish-French physician (1649–1735)

Daniel Duncan (1649–1735) was a Scottish-French physician, Huguenot by religion, known as a writer of iatrochemical works.

== Life ==
He was born at Montauban in Quercy, where his father, Peter Duncan, was professor of physics. He was orphaned when young, and he came under the guardianship of his maternal uncle, Daniel Paul, a Protestant, He was sent for his preliminary education to Puy Laurens. Here he made the acquaintance of Pierre Bayle, a fellow-student, two years his senior. Duncan then went to Montpellier to study medicine, and, after living for several years in the house of Charles Barbeyrac, took the degree of M.D. in 1673.

Duncan went to Paris, where he became acquainted with the minister Jean-Baptiste Colbert, by whom he was appointed physician-general to the army before Saint-Omer, commanded by the Duke of Orléans in 1677. After the peace of Nimeguen, he left the army and in 1678 published his first medical work in Paris. He then spent two years in London, where he particularly employed himself in collecting information about the great plague of 1666. In 1681, he was summoned back to Paris to attend his patron Colbert; after Colbert's death in 1683, Duncan returned to Montauban.

After the revocation of the edict of Nantes in 1685 he decided to leave France and settle in England. In 1690 he went to Switzerland, where, in Geneva and afterwards for some years in Bern, he worked as a physician and for French emigrants. In 1699 Philip, Landgrave of Hesse-Philippsthal sent for him from Cassel, where his wife was seriously ill. Duncan was successful in his treatment of her case. He stayed for three years in the Landgrave's palace. His fame reached Berlin, and he was invited by Frederick I of Prussia, the newly created King in Prussia, and he went in 1702. But, though he was appointed professor of physic and also physician to the royal household, he found the habits of the court distasteful, and the cost of living excessive; in 1703 he passed on to The Hague, where he remained for about twelve years.

In 1714, he settled in England. For the last sixteen years of his life would take no fees, although he lost money in the South Sea bubble in 1721. He died in London 30 April 1735, aged 86, leaving behind him an only son, of the same name.

== Works ==
Duncan's published works include:

- Explication nouvelle et méchanique des actions animales, où il est traité des fonctions de l'âme, Paris, 1678.
- La Chymie naturelle, ou l'explication chymique et méchauique de la nourriture de l'animal, 1st part, Paris, 1681; 2nd and 3rd parts, de l'évacuation particuliére aux femmes, and de la formation et de la naissance de l'animal, Montauban, 1686. Reprinted in Latin at the Hague, 1707.
- Histoire de l'Animal, ou la connoissance du corps animé par la méchanique et par la chymie, Paris, 1682. Reprinted in Latin, Amsterdam, 1683.
- Avis salutaire à tout le monde contre l'abus des choses chaudes, et particulièrement du café, du chocolat, et du thé, Rotterdam, 1705, afterwards in English, London, 1706, and in German, Leipzig, 1707. Duncan attributed Landgravine's illness to the immoderate use of tea, coffee and chocolate, which had lately been introduced into Germany. Boerhaave encouraged him to publish this little treatise.
