= List of Silent Witness episodes =

Silent Witness is a British television drama. The following is a list of all episodes that have been broadcast across all television series, since the series began on 21 February 1996. The first seven series featured Amanda Burton in the lead role. Following Burton's departure (in series 8, episode 2), Emilia Fox joined the show (in series 8, episode 5) as new forensic pathologist Nikki Alexander and as of 2025 is still in the series. In the first episode of series 6, William Gaminara and Tom Ward both joined the series. After series 15, Ward left the show to pursue other projects. He was replaced by David Caves and Liz Carr who both joined the show in series 16. Gaminara left the show at the end of series 16 and was replaced by Richard Lintern from series 17. Both Lintern and Carr left the show at the end of series 23.

The series has been released on BBC DVD since July 2006, usually with two series being released together in one box set. This practice has stopped and series 17 onwards have been released as single DVDs (as was the case for series 1 and 2). Silent Witness's stories usually consist of two episodes to one story, with each part lasting 60 minutes, while series 25 is one story in six 1-hour episodes.

== Series overview ==
Series	Episodes	Originally released		Average viewership (in millions)
Series	Episodes	First released	Last released	Average viewership (in millions)
1	8	21 February 1996	3 April 1996	N/A
2	8	14 February 1997	11 April 1997	N/A
3	8	19 March 1998	24 April 1998	N/A
4	5	30 May 1999	16 June 1999	9.27
5	6	11 December 2000	20 March 2001	8.78
6	8	28 September 2002	27 October 2002	7.79
7	8	11 October 2003	2 November 2003	7.79
8	8	5 September 2004	26 September 2004	7.43
9	8	25 July 2005	16 August 2005	6.89
10	10	16 July 2006	14 August 2006	6.87
11	10	28 August 2007	25 September 2007	6.49
12	12	1 October 2008	6 November 2008	6.32
13	10	7 January 2010	5 February 2010	7.46
14	10	3 January 2011	1 February 2011	7.97
15	12	1 April 2012	20 August 2012	6.59
16	10	10 January 2013	8 February 2013	7.24
17	10	2 January 2014	31 January 2014	7.38
18	10	6 January 2015	3 February 2015	8.82
19	10	4 January 2016	2 February 2016	9.09
20	10	2 January 2017	31 January 2017	8.92
21	10	8 January 2018	7 February 2018	8.75
22	10	8 January 2019	5 February 2019	8.61
23	10	7 January 2020	4 February 2020	8.47
24	10	6 September 2021	5 October 2021	7.28
25	6	23 May 2022	7 June 2022	6.33
26	10	2 January 2023	31 January 2023	6.36
27	10	8 January 2024	13 February 2024	6.30
28	10	6 January 2025	4 February 2025	5.85
29	10	2 February 2026	3 March 2026	5.13

== Episodes ==
=== Series 1 (1996) ===
This series introduces Professor Sam Ryan, portrayed by Amanda Burton.

No. overall	No. in series	Title	Directed by	Written by	Original release date	UK viewers (millions)
1	1	"Buried Lies, Part 1"	Harry Hook	Kevin Hood	21 February 1996	12.20
Sam returns to Cambridge to take up a teaching assignment and to work for the police. In her first case, she has to deal with the death of a six-year-old girl found floating in a nearby river. The autopsy reveals that the child has suffered previous abuse, including cigarette burns and several broken ribs. Sam receives information from a prison inmate that implicates someone in a previous death and Sam suggests a radical step. In her personal life, Sam has to deal with her elderly mother who is showing signs of dementia and her sister Wyn with whom she has a strained relationship. With the exhumation of a child that had died from abuse some years earlier, Sam is able to demonstrate that there are similarities between the deaths of the two children. There is also only one individual with a connection to both cases.
2	2	"Buried Lies, Part 2"	Harry Hook	Kevin Hood	22 February 1996	12.91
When Sam's house is broken into, her personal safety is put at risk, but she pursues the case with her usual zeal.
3	3	"Long Days, Short Nights, Part 1"	Mike Barker	Ashley Pharoah	28 February 1996	N/A
When Mark James's decomposing body is found in an abandoned building, there is every indication that he was part of some occult ritual. An upside down cross was carved on his chest, his wrists were bound with ivy and he was strangled. All evidence points to his friend Sebastian Bird, a rich idler who allowed James to live in his house but who had also developed an expert knowledge of the occult before being sent down from Cambridge for having had an affair with a professor's wife. Sam's testy relationship with the police continues as she has difficulty establishing a forensic link in the case and publicly criticises the well-liked police surgeon Dr Richard Owen for attending the crime scene without the proper protective clothing. Sam also has to deal with her rebellious nephew Ricky, who is constantly fighting with his mother and announces that he has left home to move in with her.
4	4	"Long Days, Short Nights, Part 2"	Mike Barker	Ashley Pharoah	29 February 1996	N/A
When another of Sebastian Bird's one-time friends is killed, the police are ever more convinced of his guilt and grow increasingly frustrated at Sam's inability to provide them the evidence that they are sure is there. The solution lies in an old case and someone's desperate need for revenge.
5	5	"Darkness Visible, Part 1"	Noella Smith	Ashley Pharoah	13 March 1996	N/A
Sam investigates the death of a gay man while in police custody. He had been arrested while drunk and was sharing a cell with another drunk in for the night. The victim died from a blow to the head and was badly beaten post-mortem. DS Farmer is concerned that the assault may have been the work of some of her officers. Sam also meets up with Liam Slattery, an old friend she has not seen for 20 years. Sam's sister, however, is convinced Liam was responsible for the death of their father years before. When a police constable (whose wife reported that he was cracking up) is found dead, the investigating officers themselves believe something is amiss.
6	6	"Darkness Visible, Part 2"	Noella Smith	Ashley Pharoah	14 March 1996	N/A
Sam continues to be harassed by someone unknown, having to call in the bomb squad when she receives a mysterious parcel, and subsequently someone tries to run her off the road. Liam and Sam renew their relationship, but she is faced with a difficult choice.
7	7	"Sins of the Fathers, Part 1"	Ben Bolt	Kevin Hood	2 April 1996	N/A
One of Sam's students has a problem and seeks some personal advice. She and her family emigrated from Vietnam during the boat people exodus and her father wants her to enter a marriage he's arranged for her. She's worried that her husband-to-be will realise she is not a virgin and Sam counsels her that honesty is always the best policy, but in this case it drives the prospective groom to violence. When the family's restaurant is burned out, the police find a badly burned body. On the home front, Sam continues to bicker with her sister Wyn about whether their mother should be placed in a home and the bitterness over their father's death continues to divide them. DI Adams's and DC Cox's personal relationship is now affecting their work, leading Cox to request a transfer.
8	8	"Sins of the Fathers, Part 2"	Ben Bolt	Kevin Hood	3 April 1996	N/A
With the burned body now identified through dental records, the police have a suspect. However, he suffers from post-traumatic stress disorder and the police are concerned that he may lash out. When the police do finally locate him, a member of the team is killed.

=== Series 2 (1997) ===
No. overall	No. in series	Title	Directed by	Written by	Original release date	UK viewers (millions)
9	1	"Blood, Sweat and Tears, Part 1"	Julian Jarrold	John Milne	14 February 1997	N/A
Boxer Kevin Sharma dies from blows received in the ring, but pathologist Sam Ryan determines that he has a brain injury dating from sometime after his last bout two months ago. One of the governors of the boxing board, retired superintendent Jack Reeve, is concerned that it will reflect badly on them. Reeve is also trying to cancel one-time trainer Terence Cross's licence after he is the victim of a hit and run accident that leaves him a quadriplegic. A new detective superintendent, Peter Ross, is now in charge and Sam and he knew each other many years previously. Trevor finds himself alone after his wife leaves him. Sam and her sister Wyn bury their mother. Meanwhile, a boxing trainer apparently commits suicide.
10	2	"Blood, Sweat and Tears, Part 2"	Julian Jarrold	John Milne	15 February 1997	N/A
Sam is not convinced about the suicide and, with the assistance of a ballistics expert, obtains the evidence to prove the suicide was actually murder. She also learns the reason for Kevin Sharma getting into a bare-knuckles fight and now suspects that Terence Cross's hit-and-run may not have been an accident. Sam's sister Wyn continues to have difficulty coping following the death of their mother.
11	3	"Cease upon the Midnight, Part 1"	Catherine Morshead	Jacqueline Holborough; John Milne	28 February 1997	N/A
Stuart Evans is 40 years old and in the advanced stages of AIDS. When he dies the night after his birthday party, no one thinks anything of it but his parents donate his remains to scientific study. When Sam and Trevor start an examination of the remains, they notice needle marks and suspect his death may not have been straightforward. Their suspicions are confirmed when the toxicology reports indicate an extremely high level of morphine. Mark Tate is also an AIDS sufferer who has been told that he will soon go blind. He, too, dies suddenly and when the police learn that he and Evans had the same physician, they begin to suspect doctor-assisted suicide.
12	4	"Cease upon the Midnight, Part 2"	Catherine Morshead	Jacqueline Holborough; John Milne	1 March 1997	N/A
The police make an arrest but soon realise they have the wrong person in custody when a crucial piece of evidence is uncovered. Sam discovers the true identity of the person behind the deaths, but rather than tell the police, she decides to let him turn himself in. Unfortunately, this leads to a tragic result. In her personal life, Sam and Peter Ross renew their long-ago romance.
13	5	"Only the Lonely, Part 1"	Nicholas Laughland	Gillian Richmond	21 March 1997	N/A
Helen Mathews is found strangled on the street. In the course of the investigation, the police learn that she was having an affair with Alan Whyte, a flying instructor working for her husband, Michael. From the evidence, it appears as though she was about to leave her husband and move to Canada. The police uncover a similar case from several years earlier with a striking resemblance to this case and are convinced that the two must be connected. Friction again develops between Sam and the police when her forensic analysis demonstrates that the two cases have no connection whatsoever. Sam continues to fret over her decisions in her last case and her personal relationship with Peter Ross reaches breaking point. With a second murder on their hands, the police make an arrest in the case.
14	6	"Only the Lonely, Part 2"	Nicholas Laughland	Gillian Richmond	22 March 1997	N/A
Sam uncovers some very peculiar bruising on both victims that provides the police with the evidence they need to identify the person responsible. Sam's life is put at risk, however, when the murderer threatens her. Wyn Ryan, who has been living with Sam since their mother's death, has found a job and is now looking to move on. Sam and Peter continue to struggle with their relationship but are determined to make a go of it.
15	7	"Friends Like These, Part 1"	Richard Signy	Peter Lloyd	4 April 1997	N/A
When 75-year-old Millicent Lockwood is found brutally beaten to death in a local park, the police immediately focus on a local who was seen arguing with her a short time earlier. The autopsy reveals little evidence but Sam once again refuses to make the evidence they have fit the suspect, which leads to an inevitable clash with the police. She also sees two youths, Kelvin Price and Ben Quayle, act out part of the murder. The police, however, are pursuing other lines of enquiry and do not have the time, or the inclination, to pursue Sam's theories. She then sets off on her own investigation, convinced that Kelvin and Ben are the murderers. She is also concerned that one of the boys may do himself harm after a third boy, who was only peripherally involved, hangs himself.
16	8	"Friends Like These, Part 2"	Richard Signy	Peter Lloyd	5 April 1997	N/A
The police are concerned that Sam's involvement may actually taint some of the evidence they have and an angry DSI Peter Ross informs her that he has filed a formal complaint with the coroner and the chief constable over her conduct. This obviously affects their professional and personal relationship.

=== Series 3 (1998) ===
This is the last series set in Cambridge.

No. overall	No. in series	Title	Directed by	Written by	Original release date	UK viewers (millions)
17	1	"An Academic Exercise, Part 1"	Jonas Grimås	Tony McHale	19 March 1998	N/A
Sam is shaken when she has to look into the death of a very dear friend, Dr Annabelle Evans, a Cambridge professor. She was found in her home, badly beaten in what appears to be a botched burglary attempt. The police immediately focus on the husband as the likely killer but Sam suspects that an altercation at a local restaurant during the May Ball, where a waiter spilled wine on Annabelle and was fired on the spot, may provide another suspect.
18	2	"An Academic Exercise, Part 2"	Jonas Grimås	Tony McHale	20 March 1998	N/A
Sam is intrigued by the relationship some of her students may have had with Annabelle, particularly when she learns her friend may have had a lover. In her personal life, Sam has moved on. Her sister Wyn has relocated to Ireland and Peter Ross has also been transferred. She does, however, run into an old friend who also happens to be an acquaintance of her business partner Trevor.
19	3	"Fallen Idol, Part 1"	Alex Pillai	Gwyneth Hughes	2 April 1998	N/A
Gemma Boyd, an attractive 17-year-old, is found dead at the bottom of a staircase. Although the cause of death was a broken neck, there is little to indicate whether she fell or was pushed. She was found in a vacant house that her estate agent mother and stepfather were selling. The autopsy reveals that Gemma had already had a child and was pregnant. The police think that Gemma's boyfriend is their man but when someone else is revealed as the father in the latest pregnancy, Sam thinks there is a far more complex set of relationships at play. Meanwhile, Sam's sister Wyn visits from Ireland with big news: she is going to get married. Sam's relationship with James, however, takes an unfortunate turn and seems to come to an end.
20	4	"Fallen Idol, Part 2"	Alex Pillai	Gwyneth Hughes	3 April 1998	N/A
21	5	"Divided Loyalties, Part 1"	Bill Anderson	Niall Leonard	16 April 1998	N/A
Sam looks into the death of Maggie Collins who died of a heroin overdose. Sadly, her body was not discovered for several days and in that time, her infant daughter died of dehydration. Soon after Maggie's death Stephen Jackson, a small-time dealer and addict, is killed in an explosion in his home. The autopsy reveals that both of them died of overdoses from the same batch of heroin and Sam begins to doubt that their deaths were accidental.
22	6	"Divided Loyalties, Part 2"	Bill Anderson	Niall Leonard	17 April 1998	N/A
When another small-time dealer is killed, the police think they have either vigilantes or a turf war on their hands. What they have is something far more complex that involves one of their own.
23	7	"Brothers in Arms, Part 1"	Ian Knox	John Milne	23 April 1998	N/A
When Philip Nelson is killed in a farm accident, the pathologists conclude they have a straightforward case of man vs. machine and the machine won. Sam makes an error, however, and soon finds evidence that points to murder. The police suspect his handyman, all the more so when they discover he was having an affair with Nelson's wife.
24	8	"Brothers in Arms, Part 2"	Ian Knox	John Milne	24 April 1998	N/A
Sam uncovers evidence that connect at least some of the men to events in Northern Ireland when they served in the army together many years before. Sam is more than a little surprised when Charlie, an old friend, sounds her out about taking up a new Chair in Forensic Pathology at London University. DI Michael Connor and his wife take a stab at a reconciliation but he finds it difficult to forgive her infidelity and realises he has feelings for Sam.

=== Series 4 (1999) ===
This is the first series set in London. The location for Series 4 and 5 changes from each story.

No. overall	No. in series	Title	Directed by	Written by	Original release date	UK viewers (millions)
25	1	"Gone Tomorrow"	Matthew Evans	Niall Leonard	31 May 1999	10.91
Now installed in London as a Professor at Imperial university, Sam is called to assist when a helicopter carrying 16 men crashes in the North Sea en route to a drilling platform. The pilot's body is recovered and the autopsy reveals he suffered a heart attack between the time he sent a distress signal and the time the helicopter crashed. When Sam discovers the pilot had recently postponed his annual medical check-up, she suspects there is more to this than meets the eye. In completing the autopsies on the recovered bodies, it seems that the aircraft may have suffered a catastrophic electrical failure. Note: Unlike other episodes, this episode was broadcast in the UK as a single episode that was 1 hour, 34 minutes long. Subsequent releases in box sets and on streaming services split the episode back into the two part format. BBC iPlayer is the only service that has the episode in its original first broadcast form.
26	2	"A Kind of Justice, Part 1"	Richard Signy	Peter Lloyd	8 June 1999	8.47
Brian McNally is a one-time criminal with a major problem. The day after he is badly beaten by gangster Mike Georghiou, McNally finds Georghiou's strangled body at his business. He's convinced that Mike's brother Tony, also a gangster known for his violent streak, will come after him so he gets Sam to prove that he could not have been the killer. When McNally's body is found at the foot of a building, a supposed suicide, Sam feels she has somehow contributed to his death. What she does not realise is she is not only going up against organised crime, but coppers who've acted as judge, jury and executioner.
27	3	"A Kind of Justice, Part 2"	Richard Signy	Peter Lloyd	9 June 1999	8.33
28	4	"A Good Body, Part 1"	David Thacker	J. C. Wilsher	15 June 1999	9.49
Sam is reunited with newly promoted DCI Michael Connor when they investigate a fire in a cinema. Sam manages to identify all but one of the 12 victims, body #10.
29	5	"A Good Body, Part 2"	David Thacker	J. C. Wilsher	16 June 1999	8.48
As Sam gathers more information, including the use of a facial reconstruction, she comes to believe that body #10 is, in fact, someone who was supposed to have been killed years before and for which Chris Caldwell was convicted of murder. Sam becomes attracted to Caldwell and manages to get him set free, but when others are subsequently murdered, Connor does not believe Caldwell is quite as innocent as Sam believes.

=== Series 5 (2000–01) ===
No. overall	No. in series	Title	Directed by	Written by	Original release date	UK viewers (millions)
30	1	"The World Cruise, Part 1"	Coky Giedroyc	Tony McHale	11 December 2000	8.06
When twin brothers Jake and Henry Davies are found dead in their home, the police initially suspect robbery, as the elderly gentlemen were known to keep large sums of cash in the house. The autopsy reveals murder, however, and Sam determines that skin grafts both men have on their arms may have been a crude form of plastic surgery meant to cover tattoos of concentration camp numbers. Thinking they are now dealing with a hate crime, the police focus on Carl Martin, a known white supremacist. What they have, however, is a case of someone seeking revenge for the atrocities committed long ago.
31	2	"The World Cruise, Part 2"	Coky Giedroyc	Tony McHale	12 December 2000	7.61
32	3	"Two Below Zero, Part 1"	Rob Evans	Tom Needham	12 February 2001	9.11
When the naked body of a young woman is found in the snow at a Norwegian ski resort, Sam is asked to represent the Townsend family whose daughter Ruth disappeared there several weeks before. The autopsy, however, reveals that it is, in fact, the body of Louise Hutton who had vanished there some 15 years previously. When Ruth's body is found, it appears both girls were strangled in a similar fashion.
33	4	"Two Below Zero, Part 2"	Rob Evans	Tom Needham	13 February 2001	9.20
The police focus their enquiries on Ruth's boyfriend and on Henry Hutton, Louise's uncle while Sam seeks the advice of a university colleague and tries to draw a profile of the serial killer.
34	5	"Faith, Part 1"	Paul Unwin	Stephen Brady	19 March 2001	9.43
Sam becomes under great stress when she learns that she may have a tumour. As a result, she starts to question her judgment when she misses a possible explanation in determining the time of death in the case of Lloyd Dupen's wife, an apparent suicide.
35	6	"Faith, Part 2"	Paul Unwin	Stephen Brady	20 March 2001	9.28
Sam is not convinced that everything is above board and agrees to undertake a second autopsy at the request of the dead woman's mother. When she is asked by local reverend Bishop Craig to perform an autopsy on the remains of Sister Constance, a beatified nun who died forty years ago and is under consideration for canonisation, the results of the autopsy affect the religious order as well as many of those in the community who see the commercial advantages of having a local saint.

=== Series 6 (2002) ===
This is the first series set at the Lyell Center in London. This series also saw the introduction of Dr. Leo Dalton and Dr. Harry Cunningham, portrayed by William Gaminara and Tom Ward, respectively.

No. overall	No. in series	Title	Directed by	Written by	Original release date	UK viewers (millions)
36	1	"The Fall Out, Part 1"	Coky Giedroyc	Tony McHale	28 September 2002	7.72
Sam assists the police in the investigation of a multi-vehicle collision that results in the death of eleven people. She is joined by two new colleagues: Dr Leo Dalton, an experienced pathologist from Sheffield, and Dr Harry Cunningham, a new trainee pathologist who has just graduated from university. As they try to determine the cause of the accident, they find a severed arm that does not belong to any of the victims. They also have to deal with DCI Carol Deacon, whose role in the investigation appears to be not quite crystal clear to them. The mystery of the severed arm is soon cleared up when the police discover a body floating in a local river with only one arm. Sam decides to conduct her own investigation with little help from the police.
37	2	"The Fall Out, Part 2"	Coky Giedroyc	Tony McHale	29 September 2002	7.62
DCI Deacon soon reveals to Harry that two of the men in the accident were undercover policemen, and realising that Sam is being manipulated, asks her to stay away. The police refuse to inform them of all the details, and soon, Sam's interference has serious consequences. Harry continues to try to find a balance between detachment and compassion as one of the survivors of the crash seeks his assistance.
38	3	"Kith and Kill, Part 1"	Renny Rye	Peter Lloyd	5 October 2002	8.16
The police investigate an apparent break-in that resulted in the death of businessman Derek Irons, his wife and youngest daughter. Two older children survive the attack, but one is in a serious condition and the other in a coma. Sam soon discovers that Irons was a ruthless businessman who targeted his rivals' customers resulting in regular confrontations. When Harry and Leo perform the post-mortems on the three bodies, they discover that Irons was stabbed, but his wife and daughter were shot. Sam is soon reunited with an old friend from Northern Ireland, Det. Supt. Tony Ashton, who becomes the senior investigative officer on the case. As the police continue their investigation into the deaths, they begin to believe that he may have been killed elsewhere, and then transported to his home.
39	4	"Kith and Kill, Part 2"	Renny Rye	Peter Lloyd	6 October 2002	8.46
When one of the two surviving children is murdered, Ashton looks to a circle of friends and family for a possible motive. Meanwhile, Harry assists the police with the death of an old woman who is believed to have fallen down a staircase; however, his post-mortem reveals evidence that is not consistent with a fall. As the police investigate further, they soon discover a link between her death and the Irons family murders.
40	5	"Tell No Tales, Part 1"	John Duthie	Avril E. Russell	19 October 2002	7.64
When a decomposed body is found hidden in the wall of an old factory building, Sam comes to the conclusion that he was murdered. He is eventually identified by his ex-girlfriend Selina Thomson as Marcus Saul, a man who had simply disappeared one day some seven years earlier. The police soon have a suspect in mind; however, new information suggests that the identity of the killer may lie in a completely different direction. Meanwhile, at the university, Leo is asked by the Dean to investigate a break in on campus, which resulted in a large amount of drugs being stolen.
41	6	"Tell No Tales, Part 2"	John Duthie	Avril E. Russell	20 October 2002	7.92
A student is found dead after suffering a drug overdose, and the university must face the wrath of the girl's father, a major benefactor. When Leo performs the autopsy, it reveals that not only had she taken drugs, but also that she had sexual relations with three different men in the last 48 hours.
42	7	"Closed Ranks, Part 1"	Paul Wroblewski	Tony McHale	26 October 2002	8.03
Sam investigates when police probation officer Jason Villers is found murdered on a landfill site, after being tied up and being burnt across the back. The police soon establish a link between Villiers' murder and the murder of student Michael Haughty, who was found murdered in the same place just months before. With no link between the two killings, the police come to believe that they may have a serial killer on their hands. The police discover information which could result in bringing justice to Haughty's killer – but appear to have no leads on who killed Villers.
43	8	"Closed Ranks, Part 2"	Paul Wroblewski	Tony McHale	27 October 2002	6.73
When a second police probationer officer is found dead, Sam concludes that they may be dealing with a copycat killer, rather than a serial killer. The police begin to believe that a fellow probation officer may have been responsible for the murders; however, it appears that the commandant, whose son is a trainee student, is covering up the deaths to keep the reputation of the college protected. In a separate case, Harry is approached by the wife of an old university friend who asks him to perform a post-mortem on her husband, who supposedly died in a fall. However, he finds that the man was injecting himself with drugs regularly and that his wife was the one who was prescribing them to him.

=== Series 7 (2003) ===
No. overall	No. in series	Title	Directed by	Written by	Original release date	UK viewers (millions)
44	1	"Answering Fire, Part 1"	Nicholas Renton	Dusty Hughes	11 October 2003	8.09
When a suspected terrorist attack causes an explosion at a hotel resulting in multiple deaths, the intended death of a highly respected government minister appears to be the motive behind the attack. Sam discovers an old acquaintance of hers is also involved with the investigation and, as she delves deeper into the case, has to deal with her attempted rape, which occurred earlier that evening as well as the involvement of her attacker In the case.
45	2	"Answering Fire, Part 2"	Nicholas Renton	Dusty Hughes	12 October 2003	8.00
Determined to get to the bottom of the reasons behind the explosion, Sam's findings are soon undermined by an independent pathologist. To make matters worse, the investigation team threaten to strike Sam off if she supports a dead woman's family at an inquest.
46	3	"Fatal Error, Part 1"	Renny Rye	Michael Crompton	18 October 2003	7.59
Sam comes under intense scrutiny during an official inquiry into the deaths of two brothers while they were in police custody. Her findings are soon challenged by Leo, who is brought in by the Crown to perform a second autopsy. Meanwhile, a series of murders that are taking place cast suspicion heavily on a suspect who has recently been released from prison.
47	4	"Fatal Error, Part 2"	Renny Rye	Michael Crompton	19 October 2003	8.21
Sam realises that, in one of her very first cases, she gave evidence that convicted the suspect of killing his wife. During his time in prison, he continued to protest his innocence – but did years behind bars change him for the worse? Sam soon comes to believe that someone is stalking her, and the police have trouble locating the ex-convict.
48	5	"Running on Empty, Part 1"	Jon East	Ed Whitmore	25 October 2003	8.47
When a sports agent is found dead, the police suspect suicide. However, Sam is not convinced, and when the post-mortem reveals that she was in the early stages of pregnancy, and that she had severe bruising to her arms, signs of a sexual assault appear to convince Sam otherwise.
49	6	"Running on Empty, Part 2"	Jon East	Ed Whitmore	26 October 2003	6.81
Matters are complicated further when a client that the sports agent was having an affair with is also found dead. Tests reveal the father of her baby is Caucasian, which rule out her client, but appears to implicate her husband for the murder, despite his alibi. However, Sam is soon sidelined from the investigation following a disagreement with DI Jane Hurst, and Harry's efforts to determine the time of death prove unreliable.
50	7	"Beyond Guilt, Part 1"	Renny Rye	Michael Crompton	1 November 2003	8.30
Sam, Leo and Harry are alarmed when the home office assign them to re-examine the work of independent pathologist Peter Sachs. Between them, they investigate three of Sachs' cases – the murders of Craig Proctor, Brian Morris and Zoe Adams.
51	8	"Beyond Guilt, Part 2"	Renny Rye	Michael Crompton	2 November 2003	6.86
Although Sam and Leo suspect Sachs is acting suspiciously, Harry refuses to believe that he is in the wrong. Sam discovers that Sachs has been using a new method of determining time of death, and against her better judgement, uses Sachs in order to provide evidence to determine the time of death of Eddie Doyle, who was murdered owing to his being a witness to Craig Proctor's murder.

=== Series 8 (2004) ===
This series saw the departure of Professor Sam Ryan in episode 2 and the introduction of new character Dr. Nikki Alexander, portrayed by Emilia Fox, in episode 5.

No. overall	No. in series	Title	Directed by	Written by	Original release date	UK viewers (millions)
52	1	"A Time to Heal, Part 1"	Ashley Pearce	Stephen Brady	5 September 2004	8.33
When the bodies of two men are exposed during a landslide in Northern Ireland, Sam is forced to make a long overdue painful journey home. The subsequent investigation suggests the pair died during the sectarian violence of the 1970s. However, a secret closer to home soon comes to light.
53	2	"A Time to Heal, Part 2"	Ashley Pearce	Stephen Brady	6 September 2004	7.88
Sam discovers that her estranged son, whom she had at 16, is still living in Northern Ireland – and the investigation soon leads her to his doorstep. The investigation reveals evidence of RUC corruption, and Sam is soon startled when the evidence points to the involvement of a member of her own family. As the police pull out all the stops to track down the killers, Sam makes an announcement that stuns her colleagues.
54	3	"Death by Water, Part 1"	Patrick Lau	Dusty Hughes	12 September 2004	7.78
Leo and Harry's professional rivalry erupts following Sam's departure. They find themselves dealing with the case of several children living on the coast who have experienced unexplained breathing difficulties, leaving one boy, Paul, dead. While Harry believes that the case is simply nothing more than mass hysteria, Leo suspects something more sinister. Meanwhile, a man, Nick Garner, is found dead in his car with a stab wound to the chest.
55	4	"Death by Water, Part 2"	Patrick Lau	Dusty Hughes	13 September 2004	6.85
When a link between the stab victim and the ill children begins to emerge, Leo becomes determined to discover who is responsible before any more fatalities occur. However, it may be too late, as a baby, Ella, dies after being refused hospital care. Harry discovers the truth behind Nick Garner's death, and Leo realises that a boatyard may hold the key to the children's symptoms.
56	5	"Nowhere Fast, Part 1"	Danny Hiller	Richard Holland	19 September 2004	7.54
After being promoted into the Professor's position, Leo is surprised to be united with Dr Nikki Alexander. Nikki, a pathologist whose expertise lies in solving Iron Age mysteries with modern day techniques, finds herself covering new ground when she ends up bringing her expertise to bear on a modern murder. The case in question is the death of a jockey crushed by his mount during a race. Harry and Leo suspect it was simply an accident.
57	6	"Nowhere Fast, Part 2"	Danny Hiller	Richard Holland	20 September 2004	6.92
When two of the horses' owners are killed in a helicopter crash, evidence emerges that both the horse and the pilot were drugged. Harry and Leo suspect syndicate member Matt Gibb was responsible for the deaths of his co-owners and the jockey, and Nikki's skills help expose the cracks in his story. Gibb confesses to drugging the horse but denies any involvement in the helicopter crash, leaving the pathologists divided over whether to believe him.
58	7	"Body 21, Part 1"	Douglas Mackinnon	Michael Crompton	25 September 2004	7.26
The team is approached by the survivors of a major train crash, which resulted in the death of twenty-one people. Looking for answers as to who and what caused the crash, they ask Leo, Nikki and Harry to attempt to identify 'Body 21', one of the twenty-one victims who has yet to have been named. However, determined to investigate the actual cause of the crash by using backdoor methods, Leo begins to uncover a tangled web of lies. He begins to suspect that Army Major Mark Wiltshire is involved, after his stolen Land Rover is what is known to be the cause of the crash, but an alibi places him in the mess hall at the time of the incident.
59	8	"Body 21, Part 2"	Douglas Mackinnon	Michael Crompton	26 September 2004	6.87
Working with the survivor's group, the team attempts to re-create the layout of the train prior to the crash occurring. The investigation delves deeper when one of the surviving passengers commits suicide. Harry and Leo soon discover that the identification of the last victim could lead to revealing the cause of the crash, and that the solution lies on discovering an unknown romantic affair and a marital betrayal.

=== Series 9 (2005) ===
No. overall	No. in series	Title	Directed by	Written by	Original release date	UK viewers (millions)
60	1	"Ghosts, Part 1"	Richard Signy	Tony McHale	25 July 2005	7.14
Leo receives devastating news from home prompting him to set off for Sheffield immediately. Meanwhile, Nikki is called out to a river when the bodies of two unidentified women are discovered, both shot execution style. Upon his arrival in Sheffield, Leo is greeted with awful news and goes on a quest to find the man responsible.
61	2	"Ghosts, Part 2"	Richard Signy	Tony McHale	26 July 2005	6.97
Harry and Nikki attempt to counsel Leo as the police infiltrate a gang of identity fraudsters, but when he finally catches up with the enemy, he faces a difficult choice between exacting revenge or following legal procedure.
62	3	"Choices, Part 1"	Andy Hay	Doug Milburn	1 August 2005	6.32
The team is called to the scene of a drive-by shooting, where they are joined by detectives from Operation Trident investigating a turf war between drug gangs. The case proves less clear-cut than expected when evidence emerges that someone returned fire. The vehicle used is soon traced to an abandoned industrial unit, where a decomposing corpse is uncovered – and Nikki resolves to find out the true cause of death.
63	4	"Choices, Part 2"	Andy Hay	Doug Milburn	2 August 2005	6.13
The detectives discover club owner Ainsley Modest is under pressure to hand over his establishment to a local gang – but is not going down without a fight. With a second shoot-out imminent, the team faces a race against time to track down the elusive gunsmith before he can arm both factions for the confrontation. Harry follows up a lead, but finds himself in a dangerous situation, and Nikki continues to investigate Lisa's death.
64	5	"The Meaning of Death, Part 1"	Bryn Higgins	Rhidian Brook	8 August 2005	7.46
The team pursues a serial killer with a grisly desire to look at his victims' faces as they die, and the trail leads into the world of academic philosophy. However, Nikki is distracted from the case by the death of her grandmother, while Harry investigates the demise of a woman who apparently drowned in three inches of water.
65	6	"The Meaning of Death, Part 2"	Bryn Higgins	Rhidian Brook	10 August 2005	5.67
Nikki finds the cruelty of the serial killer's crimes too much to cope with – but a picture from her grandmother provides the flash of inspiration that may put the murderer behind bars. Meanwhile, Harry delves into the death of the drowning victim, discovering that her demise was the result of a cruel twist of fate.
66	7	"Mind and Body, Part 1"	Richard Signy	Jeff Povey	15 August 2005	8.02
Leo is called to investigate the suicide of Kevin Perry, a mental patient from the January House private care home, who has recently been released after his course of treatment ended. Fellow patient David Nicholson is also on the warpath, stabbing three innocent victims in his latest psychotic episode, killing two, before he is captured by police. Meanwhile, Harry is tasked with investigating the suspected suicide of seventeen-year-old Nazim Theara, who reportedly jumped in front of a train for no apparent reason. When the doctor treating both Perry and Nicholson, Dr Sanders, fails to explain why the pair carried out such actions, Nikki and Leo are forced to dig deeper, and discover that someone has been tampering with the patients' medication. But when the doctor in question decides to attempt suicide, Nikki becomes convinced that he was the one responsible, causing their conditions to remain uncontrollable.
67	8	"Mind and Body, Part 2"	Richard Signy	Jeff Povey	16 August 2005	7.38
Harry continues his investigation, against the girl's adamant mother, who is positive she did not kill herself, he discovers that the girl had taken the same cocktail of anti-depressants taken by suicide victim Kevin Perry – and the lead soon becomes linked to a dodgy online pharmacy.

=== Series 10 (2006) ===
No. overall	No. in series	Title	Directed by	Written by	Original release date	UK viewers (millions)
68	1	"Cargo, Part 1"	Michael Offer	Doug Milburn	16 July 2006	6.15
Four bodies are found in the Thames after a boat full of illegal immigrants founders. Realising they are dealing with a people-trafficking operation gone disastrously wrong, Leo, Harry and Nikki set out to discover if there are any survivors – or any other deaths – while also delving into the victims' past.
69	2	"Cargo, Part 2"	Michael Offer	Doug Milburn	17 July 2006	6.29
The team soon manages to identify the four bodies and discover two of them were a couple fleeing China because they wished to have a second child. Nikki realises their six-year-old daughter was also on the boat and may still be alive. Meanwhile, the detectives close in on the gang running the people-trafficking operation.
70	3	"Terminus, Part 1"	Alrick Riley	Jeff Povey	23 July 2006	7.10
The team members find themselves under pressure while working a number of parallel cases. Harry is called out to a council estate in which a sixteen-year-old boy has been killed in a hit-and-run, Leo investigates the cause of a fire that left a housewife dead and Nikki is called out when a bride-to-be collapses and dies on her hen night. Harry discovers that the car that killed the young boy has a custom paint job, linked to only a small number of cars in the country – but before he can inform the investigating officer, she is killed after being hit by a bus.
71	4	"Terminus, Part 2"	Alrick Riley	Jeff Povey	24 July 2006	7.04
Nikki assists the detective looking into the house fire in a separate case in which an office prank has proved fatal, Leo investigates the death of a dentist whose body was found on a night bus and Harry discovers a link between the apparent suicide of a high-profile footballer and the death of the young boy.
72	5	"A Body of Work, Part 1"	Martyn Friend	Rhidian Brook	30 July 2006	6.82
Harry's burgeoning relationship with Nikki is jeopardised when his ex-girlfriend Penny is killed in a car crash. It looks like suicide at first glance, but DCI Lauren Ambrose uncovers evidence that the victim may have had an affair – as well as a secret child.
73	6	"A Body of Work, Part 2"	Martyn Friend	Rhidian Brook	31 July 2006	6.87
Leo examines the staged death of a conceptual artist, Jimmy Triangle. With Harry determined to find Penny's killer, he and Nikki are pushed further apart when he forces her to re-examine Penny's body. Leo is puzzled by more contrary clues in Triangle's bizarre death – and soon becomes convinced that someone is playing a twisted game.
74	7	"Supernova, Part 1"	Philippa Langdale	Paul Farrell	6 August 2006	6.76
When Leo is called to investigate the apparent suicide of 14-year-old Alison Garland, it evokes painful memories of his daughter's death. But with the help of the school's child psychologist, he realises the girl was murdered. The case is soon linked to another incident in which a car salesman, Chris Duncan, was killed with the same knife.
75	8	"Supernova, Part 2"	Philippa Langdale	Paul Farrell	7 August 2006	7.27
When the deputy headteacher of the school is also found dead, Leo realises that the killings are connected to a sinister teenage pact. Meanwhile, Nikki investigates the death of an elderly victim, who appears to have died of as the result of injuries she sustained to her head and legs – but she soon believes that there is more to the situation than meets the eye.
76	9	"Schism, Part 1"	Nick Renton	Christian Spurrier	13 August 2006	7.07
A teenage girl is found tortured to death in a London dogs' home, and an office employee at one of the world's largest animal experimentation facilities is found dead in her flat. It soon emerges another woman is being held hostage by the culprits, who turn out to be the owners of the facility itself, who have kidnapped a violent team of animal activists who were seeking to raid one of the experimentation facility buildings. However, the case becomes much more complicated when Nikki is kidnapped by the activist's group leader.
77	10	"Schism, Part 2"	Nick Renton	Christian Spurrier	14 August 2006	7.30
Harry faces a race against time to find Nikki's captors, who are based deep inside the woods. Meanwhile, Leo's best friend Lionel is forced to partake in a hearing against his conduct, and Leo must decide whether to follow his conscience at the expense of his best friend's livelihood.

=== Series 11 (2007) ===
No. overall	No. in series	Title	Directed by	Written by	Original release date	UK viewers (millions)
78	1	"Apocalypse, Part 1"	Maurice Phillips	Stephen Davis	28 August 2007	6.27
Harry and Nikki are called to investigate when an RAF helicopter crashes into a detention centre for failed asylum seekers, shortly after appearing at a nearby airshow, which both Harry and Nikki were attending. When it appears that the military are trying to hush up the incident, they each open their own investigations to prove that the pilot was not at fault for the crash, and to identify a mysterious girl who fled the site amid the carnage, taking Nikki's handbag with her.
79	2	"Apocalypse, Part 2"	Maurice Phillips	Stephen Davis	29 August 2007	5.42
With Harry's attempts to prove the pilot innocent bordering on obsession, the father of the deceased asks him to perform an independent autopsy, which reveals that at the time of his death, he was taking medication for anxiety, which was brought on by the fact he believed that the aircraft was not safe to operate. Meanwhile, Nikki identifies the detention centre victim, but realises that by doing so, she may have put his daughter in danger with his long list of dangerous enemies.
80	3	"Suffer the Children, Part 1"	Brendan Maher	Greg Dinner	3 September 2007	6.85
The discovery of the mutilated body of a young African boy in a river forces Leo to face a ghost from his past – the death of his own daughter, Cassie. Questions are raised as to whether the victim was murdered in a ritual killing, and evidence points the team in the direction of a nearby church – however, Leo has other ideas, and suspects that the murders may be related to a local African cult group, operating from a warehouse unit in central London. Meanwhile, Nikki investigates the suspicious death of a priest from a local Catholic boys' school, Father Reed, who appears to have been taking drugs for depression at the time of his death.
81	4	"Suffer the Children, Part 2"	Brendan Maher	Greg Dinner	4 September 2007	6.31
Looking for evidence at the scene of the mutilated child's body, Harry and Leo discover the badly decomposed body of another young African boy, which continues to spark disagreements between them, resulting in accusations of racial bias dogging their attempts to solve the case. Meanwhile, the body of another man linked to the priest's murder gives Nikki more leads to follow up, and leads her on a trail of revenge, death and confusion amongst the school. The cold open uses the hymn Far round the world with tune Woodlands, first sung solo by boy treble Billy (Jack Finerty), who is then joined by the catholic school choir which mixes to a young gospel choir to provide the only link between the two otherwise separate stories interwoven in this episode.
82	5	"Hippocratic Oath, Part 1"	Diarmuid Lawrence	Tony McHale	10 September 2007	7.19
An accident involving a lorry and a funeral procession results in the bizarre discovery of two bodies inside a coffin – that of the deceased, Ethel Mortimer, and an unknown young man who suffered from a coke addiction. Meanwhile, Leo and Nikki's suspicions are aroused during a post-mortem on a child, Ellie Harris, who died during a high-risk operation. When the second body is identified as Jamie Featherstone, the boyfriend of nurse Claire Kizowski, both investigations lead the detectives to a surgeon, Alice Huston, who appears to have a high rate of fatality amongst her patients. Investigating the possibility that someone on Huston's team is responsible for Jamie's death, Nikki is viciously attacked when she goes to meet Claire in the hospital basement.
83	6	"Hippocratic Oath, Part 2"	Diarmuid Lawrence	Tony McHale	11 September 2007	6.90
As Nikki struggles to remember who attacked her, Harry works hard to discover just what happened to Jamie on the night of his death, and looks into Huston's case files, only to discover that she is being sued by the parents of a deceased patient – Sam Reid. However, when Harry discovers that Reid's death was down to Huston's registrar, who is also discovered to be an impostor, he soon realises that he may have worked out who is responsible for Jamie's death.
84	7	"Double Dare, Part 1"	Maurice Phillips	Michael Crompton	17 September 2007	7.19
A horrific car crash poses troubling questions for Nikki when she discovers that one of the two victims was the recently released Anna Holland, an accomplice to a particularly brutal murder whom she helped escape a life sentence four years earlier, by providing evidence for the defence. As it appears she was stabbed before her death, the police attempt to discover who knew the location of the safe house in which she was staying – and who had a strong enough grudge to want her dead. As the investigation progresses, Nikki re-interviews key witnesses from the original case.
85	8	"Double Dare, Part 2"	Maurice Phillips	Michael Crompton	18 September 2007	6.42
Nikki begins to doubt her earlier conclusions. As she prepares to publicly concede that she could have been wrong about Anna's innocence, Leo urges her not to throw her career away while there is still uncertainty – however, her father puts a spanner in the works when he sells Nikki's story to the papers, in order to secure money to clear his debt. Meanwhile, Harry tries to identify two bodies found buried in the garden of a house, and allotment, owned by a retired Spanish couple. However, he soon discovers that they are connected to his colleague's troubling case, which may or may not provide the ammunition to either clear or implicate Anna in murder.
86	9	"Peripheral Vision, Part 1"	Bruce Goodison	Christian Spurrier	24 September 2007	6.31
Nikki investigates the discovery of human bones on a former Travellers' site and realises they could be the remains of a senior police officer's missing teenage daughter, Clara Young. However, her forensic analysis raises even greater questions, when she discovers that she has found the remains of two bodies – which casts doubt on the guilt of the chief suspect. Meanwhile, Harry is assigned to an insurance case that takes a peculiar twist, when it is revealed that the victim may have died of CJD, contracted through a blood transfusion operation in India. When the main suspect in the investigation into the human remains is murdered.
87	10	"Peripheral Vision, Part 2"	Bruce Goodison	Christian Spurrier	25 September 2007	6.43
Nikki feels she is being shut out of the case and is left unsure whom to trust. However, her lone enquiries bring her into greater danger, when she discovers that someone close to the Travellers may be responsible for the killings. Meanwhile, Harry learns he has been deceived, and believes he has no option but to pursue the truth alone, in an attempt to get justice for the victims of the scam.

=== Series 12 (2008) ===
No. overall	No. in series	Title	Directed by	Written by	Original release date	UK viewers (millions)
88	1	"Safe, Part 1"	Susan Tully	Timothy Prager	1 October 2008	5.89
Nikki investigates the murder of a teenage girl, who fell from a ride at a funfair after being brutally raped and stabbed and suspects the killing may have been part of a gang initiation. Meanwhile, Leo finds himself doing community service after getting caught drink driving and is first on the scene when an attack takes place where he's working. When he tries to get information from the victim, he disappears from the radar, and only after he performs a botched stabbing does he finally reveal all he knows. However, Harry and Nikki only discover this much later when Leo finally confessed to them that he was doing community service for DUI.
89	2	"Safe, Part 2"	Susan Tully	Timothy Prager	2 October 2008	5.67
The police struggle to secure any concrete evidence against gang leader Keenan, who manages to evade them and continue his killing spree. Just when all hope seems lost, however, the team makes a breakthrough, but with the deaths of two brothers. The older one trying desperately to save the younger brother from joining the dangerous gang life, but ending up dead in enemy territory, while the younger boy is attacked by a dog, set on by Keenan who is furious that he spoke to the police. Keenan is finally caught for statutory rape of the young girl that was murdered, when they test DNA against the child that she was carrying when she was murdered. However, the gang life goes on without Keenan, when the next leader is seen recruiting a young boy into the group.
90	3	"Death's Door, Part 1"	Diarmuid Lawrence	Stephen Davis	8 October 2008	6.54
Harry befriends eager medical student Holly Farr after giving a lecture to a group of trainees and involves her in his latest case, the post-mortem of a woman whose body was found at the side of a road with the face expertly removed. Nikki tries to reconstruct the victim's features to help identify her, but Holly immediately recognises her as Fran Price – a former TV presenter and journalist who had fallen on hard times. The team's relationship with the police falls apart owing to a lack of trust, forcing Harry to pursue his own line of inquiry. As he searches for the truth, he finds himself attending a press conference conducted by Oleg Kovik, a Russian oligarch who claims Fran Price was a friend of his, and that he is the next target of her killer because of a book he was helping Fran to write. Things become muddled when Harry sees the Detective Superintendent investigating the murder entering Holly's home after he visited her just a few minutes earlier. She is later found dead in her bed.
91	4	"Death's Door, Part 2"	Diarmuid Lawrence	Stephen Davis	9 October 2008	6.73
92	5	"Terror, Part 1"	Alex Pillai	Michael Crompton	15 October 2008	6.41
An armed police raid at a terraced house in North London sees two suspected terrorists killed, along with a police officer. Nikki doubts the officers' accounts of events after carrying out the post-mortems, as the forensic evidence just does not add up. The case then takes an unexpected turn when it transpires one of the surviving policemen is having an affair with his dead colleague's wife. Nikki and Harry form a bond as they search for the truth, but accusations fly and paranoia is heightened when another terror suspect dies in hospital.
93	6	"Terror, Part 2"	Alex Pillai	Michael Crompton	16 October 2008	6.44
Harry uses cutting-edge techniques to uncover the identity of one of the suspected terrorists, and soon discovers, much to his surprise, that she was a police officer, working undercover for the drug squad. Leo performs the post-mortem on the third terror suspect, and soon realises that the team's assumptions about the shooting were wrong – and that the real assailant is still at large.
94	7	"Judgement, Part 1"	Diarmuid Lawrence	Christian Spurrier	22 October 2008	6.70
When the body of a member of the Jewish Hasidic community, Yitshok Hassam, is discovered, the team agrees to perform a 'dry' post-mortem on the victim to respect the wishes of his faith. A forensic link is found to a group of Polish labourers, but Harry begins to wonder whether the victim's wife is hiding something and decides to carry out a full autopsy to determine the time of death.
95	8	"Judgement, Part 2"	Diarmuid Lawrence	Christian Spurrier	23 October 2008	6.29
When another Jewish body is also found, Harry becomes convinced that his and Yitshok's deaths are linked. DNA testing suggests the killer is Hasidic, but the police refuse to believe the claims and demand that Harry be taken off the case. However, Nikki decides to stand by her colleague and the pair make some shocking discoveries after re-testing all of the DNA samples.
96	9	"The Lost Child, Part 1"	Dudi Appleton	Dudi Appleton, Jim Keeble	29 October 2008	5.89
A boy's body is discovered near his school, and a search is launched when the classmate he was last seen with, Liam, is reported missing. After it transpires the deceased was abused and had traces of an unknown toxic chemical in his body, the youngsters' headmaster, a man who used to teach Nikki, becomes a suspect – and a second corpse is found.
97	10	"The Lost Child, Part 2"	Dudi Appleton	Dudi Appleton, Jim Keeble	30 October 2008	6.25
The search for Liam resumes and a link is discovered between the dead schoolboy's stepfather and the missing child. Meanwhile, Nikki performs a post-mortem on the second body and finds traces of the same unknown toxin present in the first. Leo and Harry try to identify and locate the source of the chemical in a bid to find out where Liam is being held and are led to a container hidden in the woods.
98	11	"Finding Rachel, Part 1"	Tim Fywell	Michael Crompton	5 November 2008	6.70
The team flies out to Zambia to investigate the death of a doctor, Rachel Gates, who had gone missing two weeks earlier. It transpires that she was volunteering as a practitioner for a mission and had believed a number of refugees died in suspicious circumstances. Leo and Nikki carry out a post-mortem, but their findings throw the case into disarray. The bones originally thought to be Rachel's are identified as another victim, a local woman, and the search for her body begins.
99	12	"Finding Rachel, Part 2"	Tim Fywell	Michael Crompton	6 November 2008	6.51
When Rachel's friend Bethany is found dead inside a nightclub, Nikki is arrested for attempting to carry out a post-mortem on the girl against her mother's wishes. Harry learns foul play was involved in Bethany's death, and Leo has the local water samples tested – with surprising results.

=== Series 13 (2010) ===
No. overall	No. in series	Title	Directed by	Written by	Original release date	UK viewers (millions)
100	1	"Intent, Part 1"	Udayan Prasad	Timothy Prager	7 January 2010	8.56
Harry and Nikki are tasked to investigate the death of insurance investigator William Byfield, who appears to have committed suicide by suffocating from fumes from an exhaust pipe piped into his car. An initial examination appears to confirm that theory, until lab assistant Charlie re-examines the stomach contents, and faints at the smell of cyanide being present – suggesting that the deceased may have been poisoned, not stabbed. Meanwhile, Leo is confronted by Byfield's replacement, Clare Ambler, after she discovers that Byfield's last case was investigating the untimely death of Stephen Connelly, a healthy middle-aged man. However, despite his signature being on the post-mortem report, Leo has no recollection of ever performing one – and nor is there any record that Connelly's body ever arrived at the Lyell Centre. Believing that Leo has committed fraud on behalf of the deceased's relatives, Clare has Leo investigated by the police – but her crusade is short lived when Leo is smashed on the back of the head and left for dead outside his house.
101	2	"Intent, Part 2"	Udayan Prasad	Timothy Prager	8 January 2010	7.81
The case isn't helped when Harry and the Connelly widow have an affair. She is briefly suspected of murdering her husband and the situation turns from bad to worse when the body of coroner's assistant David Levin is found in the boot of Connelly's widow's car.
102	3	"Voids, Part 1"	Thaddeus O'Sullivan	Ed Whitmore	14 January 2010	7.78
Stock banker Bridget Flannery is found dead at the bottom of her stairs. However, with the crime scene having been disturbed by the family's dog and a blundering WPC, Harry and Nikki struggle to decide whether her death was accidental – or if somebody repeatedly struck her over the face, causing her to fall. Suspicion quickly falls on the victim's husband, media personality Tom Flannery, who has an old grudge with the police, which appears to be the deciding factor in whether or not to charge him with his wife's murder. In an attempt to prove Tom's innocence, his lawyer asks Nikki to perform a second post-mortem – but the results are less than satisfactory for Harry, whose evidence appears to contradict Nikki's point for point. As the pair are unable to decide cause and motive of death, they find themselves battling it out in a courtroom. But when photos are leaked to the press regarding the death of Flannery's first wife, Nikki starts to doubt her own evidence – and believes that she may have interpreted the case from completely the wrong angle.
103	4	"Voids, Part 2"	Thaddeus O'Sullivan	Ed Whitmore	15 January 2010	7.59
With Leo still recovering from his attack, Harry decides to use the situation to his advantage, and suspecting that the fate of Flannery's first wife Olga, may also lie in Flannery's hands, he persuades Leo to put him in touch with a professor in Prague, only to discover that Olga was also murdered – leaving him in no doubt that Flannery is their chief suspect.
104	5	"Run, Part 1"	Susan Tully	Andrew Holden	21 January 2010	7.44
Leo's first case on his return to work involves the shattered body of a young woman, Ruth Gardiner, found below a block of derelict flats, having apparently fallen from the roof. The post-mortem indicates suicide, but Leo realises he missed vital signs when he uncovers evidence that the girl had been shot in the head before being dragged to the roof and thrown off, leading the police to reopen the case. When DI Neill seems reluctant to pursue the possibility that Ruth may have been an informant for an undercover police officer, Phil Nelson, Leo starts to wonder if Ruth's death is part of a cover-up. When a gun is found near Ruth's squat, investigations lead Neill to Alex Webb, an employee of a local car dealership. Harry, meanwhile, is forced to confront some uncomfortable family secrets when an old family friend, Mary Bradburn, shows up at the Lyell Centre for the post-mortem of her husband, James. Discovering that James had taped a plastic bag over his head in order to suffocate himself, Harry is forced to come to terms with some of his own family revelations, when Nikki persuades him to finally look into the circumstances of his own father's suicide. Meanwhile, Leo discovers that Phil Nelson is just one of three aliases used by Peter Carmody and realises that he is linked to another two murders – including that of Alex Webb.
105	6	"Run, Part 2"	Susan Tully	Andrew Holden	22 January 2010	7.10
106	7	"Shadows, Part 1"	Farren Blackburn	Dudi Appleton, Jim Keeble	28 January 2010	7.39
When a student suicide occurs on a university campus, Leo liaises with the Dean and investigating officer DC Saich after it emerges the deceased, Jason Renfrew, was the victim of bullying. Concern grows when a gun and live ammunition are discovered in the dead boy's locker, and the contents from a memory card found in his stomach reveal files containing photos of students, some of whom he named as his tormentors. Before the team can investigate further, its fears become a horrible reality as one of the main campus buildings comes under attack by a rampaging shooter, trapping Harry and Nikki inside. All Leo can do is watch helplessly via CCTV security cameras as his colleagues try to help the wounded. Specialist firearms officers storm the building and find suspected shooter Scott Weston, lying on the floor, with a bullet wound to the head. As the wounded and dead are wheeled out, Harry stays to help the paramedic attending to Weston. Unable to help, Nikki returns to the pathology lab, but realises she is not alone, when student Neil Corrigan enters the lab and locks the doors behind him.
107	8	"Shadows, Part 2"	Farren Blackburn	Dudi Appleton, Jim Keeble	29 January 2010	7.64
As Leo starts preliminary post-mortems on the victims in a temporary mortuary in the university's sports hall, he soon realises that there were two guns used in the incident. Meanwhile, with Neil pointing a gun at Nikki, she starts to work out events as he slowly confides in her, and it soon becomes apparent Weston had a much bigger agenda than the shooting – blowing up the entire campus with a number of chemical bombs.
108	9	"Home, Part 1"	Paul Wilmshurst	Michael Crompton	4 February 2010	6.85
Nikki returns to her childhood home in South Africa, after she is hired by a private security firm to investigate the cold case of the disappearance of five young men in the 1980s, known as the Kensington Five. However, upon excavating the crime scene, she discovers the remains of six bodies, and begins to wonder if the culprit has told everything. Meanwhile, Harry and Leo are also in Cape Town for a scientific conference, but are waylaid by respective requests to lend their expertise to the examination of a woman's body dragged out of a bay, and the effort to reverse the deportation of a Zimbabwean asylum seeker, Kudzai, who was tortured in her home country. When Kudzai is recruited by a corrupt immigration official to work at a local brothel, Leo discovers a link between the dead woman from the bay and the owner of the brothel itself.
109	10	"Home, Part 2"	Paul Wilmshurst	Michael Crompton	5 February 2010	6.46
As Nikki manages to confirm that the skeletons she is asked to examine are the remains of the Kensington Five, she decides to pay a visit to informant Captain Brackenfell – but soon discovers that a corrupt politician, who is a good friend of her ex-business partner, was the man whose information led to the murders, she is left to make a difficult decision about her love life. And as Harry and Leo get closer to the truth, they discover that there are plenty of untold, dirty secrets held deep within the African countryside.

=== Series 14 (2011) ===
No. overall	No. in series	Title	Directed by	Written by	Original release date	UK viewers (millions)
110	1	"A Guilty Mind, Part 1"	Susan Tully	Timothy Prager	3 January 2011	7.41
The day after Professor Silverlake, a consultant neurologist at the Dartmouth London hospital, raised his voice at three patients for smoking and drinking on the premises, all three are found murdered in their hospital beds. Silverlake, apparently the last doctor to visit the ward, later goes berserk with a shotgun after he is accused of the killings and is shot dead by a police marksman. Leo and Harry believe they have a cut and dried case, but when the ward's night nurse is also murdered, realise they could have a cover-up on their hands. Meanwhile, Nikki is deeply upset at having to perform an autopsy on an eight-year-old girl who is suspected to have been raped and murdered by convicted criminal Jason Bodie, a man upon whom Professor Silverlake once performed live-saving surgery. While Bodie is committed as unfit to plead, Silverlake's daughter Naomi asks Leo and Harry to help clear her father's name of murder.
111	2	"A Guilty Mind, Part 2"	Susan Tully	Timothy Prager	4 January 2011	7.60
112	3	"Lost, Part 1"	Anthony Byrne	Richard Davidson	10 January 2011	7.87
Nikki's archaeologist friend Patrick becomes excited when a woman's body, apparently a thousand years old, is unearthed on a Yorkshire moor. However, dental records show she is a more recent murder victim and Leo, who once worked in the area, believes she is Jodie Fisher, a teenage girl who went missing in 1985. Three other girls were murdered at the time, and the killer, Karl Bentley, was caught, confessed, and was jailed. Leo decides to visit Bentley in jail; however, he realises that the wrong man may have been jailed after a copycat killing is committed just hours later. Leo travels to Sheffield, where he uncovers the identity of the fresh victim, Kelly Summers. Leo reconnects with the mother of Jodie Fisher, the case he handled in 1985 and it was revealed that he had a brief affair with her after that. However, DNA tests confirm that the body found was not Jodie Fisher's. He soon realises, however, that Bentley may have had an accomplice, who is still at large. This is confirmed when investigating officer Sonia Hardwick finds a letter to Bentley from his boyfriend in the original case file, supposedly buried by the original investigating officer, ACC Maynard. Leo soon deduces that Bentley's lover, Stephen Fisher, may be responsible for all of the murders. He was responsible for Jodie's death, whose body was buried on his parents' ground after killing her when she found out about Stephen and Bentley's secret affair and threatened to tell his mother.
113	4	"Lost, Part 2"	Anthony Byrne	Richard Davidson	11 January 2011	8.19
114	5	"First Casualty, Part 1"	Keith Boak	Michael Crompton, Oliver Brown	17 January 2011	8.50
When army soldier Lieutenant Lockford takes his own life at the Hillsdon army base, his friends and colleagues believe the suicide was caused by the traumatic experience of watching his friend, and fellow officer, Danny Ferris, die in battle. However, evidence soon comes to light that just before his death, Lockford had been arguing with Catz, Ferris's ex-girlfriend. And when the body of a young female is pulled from a nearby river, it turns out to be none other than Catz herself. When Nikki discovers that Catz was having an affair with Lieutenant Lockford, she suspects foul play may have resulted in her death, and that there may be an ulterior motive that contributed to Lockford's suicide.
115	6	"First Casualty, Part 2"	Keith Boak	Michael Crompton, Oliver Brown	18 January 2011	8.21
Harry carries out the post-mortem on Lockford, and soon discovers he did not commit suicide, and was instead murdered, after the discovery of a bullet lodged in the front of his brain – fired after the fatal shot that killed him. When Nikki discovers Catz made a phone call to former soldier Dennis Croft, who was cashiered for drug peddling just before her death, she believes it could be the clue to uncovering the real identity of Catz's killer. And when the police catch Croft skulking at Catz's flat, they take him into custody, only for him to reveal that there was a cover-up over Danny Ferris's death, and that Ferris was, in fact, shot by one of his own men during the battle. Danny Ferris's father also claimed that the army did not fully disclose what happened on the battlefield. After discovering that Croft was on the army base the day that Lockford was murdered, the police soon believe they have caught the killer of both victims. CCTV evidence, however, discovers that Catz's death was due to a bizarre accident, when she fell down a staircase in the bus after meeting Lockford. Lockford accidentally shot Ferris during the battle and could not come to terms with it and suffered PTSD when he was back in UK. He threatened to shoot himself in front of his sergeant during an argument, but the sergeant thought it was better to have him dead than kill more of his team on the battleground because of his mental state since returning from battle. Harry confronted him before boarding the 'plane for his next deployment to Afghanistan, but Harry could not prove his guilt. Six weeks later, the sergeant is killed in battle and buried with full honours.
116	7	"Bloodlines, Part 1"	Dudi Appleton	Dudi Appleton, Jim Keeble	24 January 2011	8.32
Harry finds a new case on his hands when his girlfriend of three months, human rights lawyer Anna Sandór, calls him to Budapest to investigate the death of a prostitute. He is warned by British diplomat Duncan McBurney to avoid getting entangled in Anna's activities, and when Anna is murdered, suspicion falls on his shoulders, and he is forced to go on the run, as the police appear to be in league with the Ukrainian gang he believes are responsible for her death. Leo arrives from Britain to find Harry, and soon learns that Anna was pregnant. Assisted by Janos, an ex-Communist, Harry arranges to meet Leo at the ferry terminal, but Anna's murderer gets there first, shoots Janos dead and corners Harry. Leo arrives to hear gunshots and finds a burning body on the promenade. Nikki is soon warned of the trouble and flies out to join the team. The police soon identify the burning body as Harry's.
117	8	"Bloodlines, Part 2"	Dudi Appleton	Dudi Appleton, Jim Keeble	25 January 2011	7.53
Nikki and Leo receive a mysterious phone message inviting them to a rendezvous. There they find Harry, who tells them how his would-be murderer was accidentally killed, and that he planted his own possessions on the burning body to enable him to evade the police. The team continues to investigate Anna's murder, and question a prostitute, Marina, in the hope of finding the motive and exposing her killers. A scam to steal prostitutes' babies and sell them to childless couples is finally revealed, and the police who behaved so suspiciously turn out to be undercover officers involved in catching the villains – whose leader and mastermind turns out to be diplomat McBurney.
118	9	"The Prodigal, Part 1"	James Strong	Michael Crompton	31 January 2011	8.40
Nikki, Harry and Leo are called to the Dutch Embassy in the wake of a shooting, in which an unidentified gunman has shot dead three people – police constable Ryan Barlow, Dutch ambassador Peter Van Buren's sister, Trudy, and a third victim, only identified as Van Buren's personal bodyguard. During the shooting, Van Buren's daughter, Klara, is also injured, and his eight-year-old grandson, and Klara's son, Jack, disappears without trace. With the revelation that Van Buren's son, Yacoub, also disappeared without trace fifteen years ago, and that his brother, Diedrick, was killed in a car accident three years ago in Nigeria, Nikki starts to believe that one lone assailant may be responsible for the 'curse' that has tainted the Van Buren family for the past several years. Klara manages to survive her injuries, alongside her boyfriend, and fellow police constable, Craig Whitehead, but her shock revelation that the gunman was, in fact, none other than her missing sibling, Yacoub, sends the police and the pathologists on a wild goose chase.
119	10	"The Prodigal, Part 2"	James Strong	Michael Crompton	1 February 2011	7.69
Van Buren's au pair Mary Olivant, is found hanged from a tree on Hampstead Heath, having committed suicide. And when the case looking into Yacoub's disappearance is re-opened, Nikki discovers that the third victim may not be Van Buren's bodyguard, and the team comes close to uncovering a dark family secret – until the Dutch Embassy throw them off the case, and another pathologist, James Sabiston, who trained with Leo and Harry at the Lyell centre, is called in to carry out the post-mortems on the deceased police officer, Trudy Van Buren and the questionable identity of the third victim. When it is discovered that Van Buren's brother Diedrick, who had supposedly died three years ago, is the third victim, the team opens a whole can of worms, including the possibility that Van Buren was responsible for the death and disappearance of his son.

=== Series 15 (2012) ===
This series saw the departure of Dr Harry Cunningham at the end of the series (though off-screen).
Note that this list is in order of first broadcast by the BBC. The BBC postponed the first broadcast of episode And Then I Fell in Love for "editorial reasons" shortly before its intended broadcast and brought forward Domestic in its place, eventually showing And Then I Fell in Love four months later (after it had been shown in Australia).
The originally intended order of episodes now used by other broadcasters and by IMDb is:
Death Has No Dominion, And Then I Fell in Love, Paradise Lost, Domestic, Redhill, Fear.

No. overall	No. in series	Title	Directed by	Written by	Original release date	UK viewers (millions)
120	1	"Death Has No Dominion, Part 1"	Andy Hay	Ed Whitmore	1 April 2012	7.93
The team attends the scene of a triple murder at a farmhouse, where the investigating detective, DI Connie James, wastes no time making her presence and suppositions felt. The pathologists soon make a breakthrough when DNA found at the scene matches that of a mysterious female serial killer – , nicknamed "the Wraith", although Nikki has cause to question the direction they are heading in. The case is proving difficult for Leo, however, whose mind is in turmoil following the suicide of an old friend.
121	2	"Death Has No Dominion, Part 2"	Andy Hay	Ed Whitmore	2 April 2012	6.86
Harry persuades Connie to disobey orders and test DNA evidence from the original investigation, and Janet is called in to help build the personality of the female serial killer. Leo is still troubled by the suicide of his friend Lizzie Frazer, prompting Nikki to dig deeper into the murder of the woman's sister ten years before. The episode is partly based on the Phantom of Heilbronn case.
122	3	"Domestic, Part 1"	Anthony Byrne	Richard Davidson	8 April 2012	7.35
Harry is disturbed to be called to a crime scene at the home of a family he knows, (flashbacks showing him and Nikki attending a party a few years earlier in the same house), and finds the bodies of the mother and her teenage daughter, while her stepson lies in a coma – although her toddler has been left unharmed. The police suspect the woman's husband to be the killer – but the pathologist is not so sure of his guilt.
123	4	"Domestic, Part 2"	Anthony Byrne	Richard Davidson	9 April 2012	6.67
The double-murder investigation reveals more about the tangled lives of the inhabitants of Magnolia Drive, involving the couple, the husband's brother, the ex-wife, the neighbour and her son. Harry makes a significant discovery about the dead woman's stepson Charlie, found lying in a coma at the crime scene, while uncovering a deep dark family secret, which played a part in the sequence of events leading to the deaths. Meanwhile, Leo sets out to recreate the shape of the mystery weapon, with the help of forensic scientist Gill Bailey.
124	5	"Paradise Lost, Part 1"	Edward Bennett	Stephen Davis	15 April 2012	7.59
Nikki is furious with Leo when he re-examines a child abuse case by her former mentor, leading to conflict between the pathologists. But she soon has more to worry about when a workman at the centre reveals how his mother, Annie, is being manipulated by a convicted serial killer into searching for his hidden teenage victims' bones. The team tracks down the detective who originally worked on the Arnold Mears case, who admits just wanting to lock Mears up after several team members resigned/transferred because they could no longer take the gruesome stories by Mears. Coincidentally, Leo is visited by Nikki's former mentor who may be suspended or have her licence revoked owing to disciplinary issues, and is asked by him to review a research she did on Arnold Mears. She is found dead the next day after committing suicide, with a suicide message to Leo on her computer and a letter from Mears is found, containing an extract from the book Paradise Lost.
125	6	"Paradise Lost, Part 2"	Edward Bennett	Stephen Davis	16 April 2012	5.53
The team continues the investigations that led Nikki to examine the church he visited as a boy. Mears is furious that the police have been made aware of the undiscovered bodies and, claiming he knows where to look, he sends Annie out to search for her daughter. Eventually, he agrees to talk, but only to Nikki. Can she outwit the scheming convict and compel him to reveal the whereabouts of the corpses – and Annie?
126	7	"Redhill, Part 1"	Andy Hay	Ed Whitmore	22 April 2012	7.16
There is little sympathy when child-killer James Wade dies in his cell, but Leo's encounter with dying ex-prison inspector Rachel Kruger compels him to investigate the notorious Redhill jail – only to come up against a wall of silence. Meanwhile, Harry meets Wade's sister Miriam and agrees to help find her brother's killer.
127	8	"Redhill, Part 2"	Andy Hay	Ed Whitmore	23 April 2012	5.89
Harry and Nikki dig deep into DI Bridges' past and soon make a significant discovery. DI Bridges had an affair with one of the prison guards, Kessler and covered for him when they were partners 10 years earlier. The affair resulted in her having a son, while married. Leo is determined to get at the truth about the murder of ex-prison inspector Rachel Kruger and decides to follow violent officer Kessler – but before long he finds himself in dangerous territory. It was later revealed that Miriam Wade paid a handsome sum to the prison doctor, deeply in debt for medical expenses for his daughter, to poison her brother in prison with a patch during a routine exam. She wanted to remove any links to the Wade surname, and this failed to work out and resulted in the death of Kruger and her assistant who were investigating the Redhill prison, including the doctor's financial records for the significant sum of money recently credited into his account. When the doctor realised how close he was being found out, he resorted to killing Kruger and her assistant. Leo tells Janet that he no longer loves her, because he knows how much she wants to adopt and he does not. He does not want to deprive her of the happiness of having children.
128	9	"Fear, Part 1"	Mike Barker	Dudi Appleton, Jim Keeble	29 April 2012	6.23
Leo visits old college friend Sean Delaney at his psychiatric care centre in Essex, where one of the patients, Eve, was found dead in her bed. Although the coroner ruled a verdict of sudden death syndrome, Delaney is not convinced and asks Leo to investigate. Suspicion soon falls on the dead girl's father, who has lost the family fortune and his wife – but the pathologist runs into problems when the local detective sergeant gives him a less-than-warm welcome, making it clear she is suspicious of his motives. The team delves deeper into the circumstances surrounding Eve's death. Leo confronts the girl's mother and comes close to what actually happened the night before her daughter died.
129	10	"Fear, Part 2"	Mike Barker	Dudi Appleton, Jim Keeble	30 April 2012	5.42
Harry and Nikki track down the nun who performed the exorcism – and are shocked by what they find. Psychiatrist Sean turns his attention to Eve's brother John, who believes he is also possessed by the demons that haunted his sister – is history about to repeat itself? Or, more crucially, does anyone care?
130	11	"And Then I Fell in Love, Part 1"	Keith Boak	Timothy Prager	19 August 2012	6.44
Nikki sees a barefoot girl being knocked over by a car, marking the beginning of a case that takes the team into the harrowing world of sex grooming and trafficking for rape of underage girls. The police know the teenager has been abused, but the question is, by whom? Suspicion soon falls on her stepfather. An early-morning bath saves Harry's life, and he moves in with Nikki when his flat blows up in a gas explosion. Two puzzling corpses are brought in to the centre – a heavily tattooed man and a decomposed body found in a suitcase at the airport.
131	12	"And Then I Fell in Love, Part 2"	Keith Boak	Timothy Prager	20 August 2012	5.97
Nikki uses facial reconstruction to identify the decomposed body found at the airport, and she and Harry make a crucial connection between the dead girl and sex-grooming victim Shannon, who is later returned to her family. When Shannon was in the hospital, she remained terrified of the men who kept her in a locked room for prostitution and refused to give information to the police. But when her stepfather learns about her torment, he vows revenge on the men who abused her. She later commits suicide when she is sent a video of her ordeal by her kidnappers. The gang of pimps uses a mini-cab taxi service as a front. They lure two more young school girls into the business, but one man takes a liking to one, Hannah, and tries to save them both, though he dies while trying to escape with the girls from another man. When Hannah visits the morgue to see the man who saved her earlier, Nikki attempts to convince her to provide the police with information. This results in the capture of all except the leader, who is later beaten to death by Shannon's devastated stepfather, who watched the video of her rape on her phone.

^a Episodes originally in swapped places.

=== Series 16 (2013) ===
This series saw the departure of Professor Leo Dalton at the end of the series. This series saw the introduction of forensic scientist Jack Hodgson portrayed by David Caves. Forensic technician Clarissa Mullery portrayed by Liz Carr was introduced in episode 2 as a recurring character.

No. overall	No. in series	Title	Directed by	Written by	Original release date	UK viewers (millions)
132	1	"Change, Part 1"	Anthony Byrne	Timothy Prager	10 January 2013	7.59
John Briggs (Tim Pigott-Smith), a wealthy, ageing confectionery company owner, is found dead in his London hotel suite. Nikki listens to the arguments put forward by forensic scientist Jack Hodgson (David Caves) to prove to sceptical DS Gold that suspicious circumstances surround the death. It is learned that Briggs was losing a desperate fight to prevent the sale of his ailing company to investors. Michael Trenter, his business adviser, seems keen to conceal Briggs' murky private life from the press, as it threatens to devalue the "family brand". Briggs' brother, Philip, is shocked to learn that Briggs has left control of the company to his estranged daughter, Geraldine, who ponders the reason for her involvement. Suspicion falls on a "call-girl" seen leaving the hotel, but Briggs' lawyer, Annette Kelly, reveals that the girl, Deana, is, in fact, Geraldine's daughter, adopted when her mother was sixteen.
133	2	"Change, Part 2"	Anthony Byrne	Timothy Prager	11 January 2013	7.09
Evidently, someone is leaking information to the press, and Jack accuses DC Gus Cook, resulting in the two fighting. When Deana's body is found by the Thames, Jack deduces that she was murdered and finds her mobile phone, which shows she was in league with Trenter; DNA proves she was not, in fact, Geraldine's daughter. Annette Kelly reveals information about Briggs and Trenter to Geraldine. When she, too, is found murdered, Geraldine is suspected. When questioned by the police, Geraldine reveals that her daughter was a product of rape by her uncle, Philip, and she was forced to give up the baby. Then, the company's value falls to the point where the primary bidder, Schwartzman, can pick it up for next to nothing. When Philip learns the extent of Trenter's double-dealing, he kills him; Trenter is subsequently revealed to be the murderer of both Deana and Annette Kelly. Leo decides to secure the Lyell Centre's future by employing Jack to head up a new forensics department. Jack insists on bringing along his trusted technician, Clarissa (Liz Carr).
135	3	"Trust, Part 1"	Richard Clark	Richard Davidson	17 January 2013	7.44
Nikki and Jack investigate the death of two women, who have been tied up and tortured in a basement. The trail of evidence leads eventually to a research institute at which Lucas Ballinger is employed. Meanwhile, Leo becomes involved in the case of a young woman imprisoned for the murder of her baby, as a result of a direct approach from the baby's father, who wants to avoid having his older son taken into care while not wishing to incriminate himself. When a third woman is killed in a similar manner to the first two, the team discovers a link with both Hearns, an ex-soldier, and Ballinger, who goes on the run. The investigation is complicated by Jack's feelings for the investigating police officer, DI Reid, a former lover whom he suspects of having previously betrayed him by tampering with forensic evidence. Nikki, at first sympathetic towards Reid, changes her view when she is trapped in a building set on fire by Hearns to conceal the third murder and Reid fails to help her.
136	4	"Trust, Part 2"	Richard Clark	Richard Davidson	18 January 2013	7.29
Ballinger tracks down and kills Hearns, then goes after his boss at the research institute, Dr Christie, who is behind Hearns' activities and the release of anthrax spores to create demand for a vaccine manufactured by his company. Ballinger was also unaware that his wife was three months pregnant, which nearly caused him to kill Dr Christie. Nikki and Jack see through Reid when she begins an affair with a senior officer, and track Ballinger to a park, where he reveals that he was blackmailed by Hearns into participating in the release of the spores because Hearns had kidnapped his wife, one of the murdered women. Nikki tried to talk to him and managed to extract the bag, which looked suspicious to the police before an impatient Reid brings in a police sniper to kill Ballinger and is finally shamed by the failure to find any weapon among his personal effects.
136	5	"True Love Waits, Part 1"	Thaddeus O'Sullivan	Ed Whitmore & Tracey Malone	24 January 2013	7.39
When a pub landlady is stabbed to death and her little finger is cut off by the killer, Nikki seeks to prove the innocence of the dead woman's husband, Roly Henderson, against the police's mounting evidence to suggest his involvement. Concerned for the couple's young daughter, Nikki convinces Jack and Leo that this is, in fact, the latest victim of a psychopathic serial killer, and when Jack discovers that the intransigent DI Kate Warren has falsified evidence under the influence of her father, a senior police officer, he joins the search. Under pressure from her father, DI Warren arrests Henderson for the murder of his wife. Nikki visits another convicted man who was imprisoned for murdering his wife and she finds that the couple could have been attacked by the same man. After further investigation of the evidence to this murder, the team pursues other suspects and suspicion falls on Alan Lane, an ex-policeman who has already served a prison sentence for the murder of his own wife, and currently lives on the farm and sells hiking equipment from a van. Nikki visits Alan's mother-in-law, who informs her of Alan's behaviour before and during their marriage, that her husband was found murdered, and that she was asked to move out after Alan and her daughter moved into their farm.
137	6	"True Love Waits, Part 2"	Thaddeus O'Sullivan	Ed Whitmore & Tracey Malone	25 January 2013	7.33
Nikki tracks down Anne Percival, the retired detective involved in the case. Unknown to the team, Percival is aware that Lane's wife, Imogen, is not dead and is assisting Imogen in protecting herself and her daughter from discovery by Lane. When Percival contacts Imogen, she felt it was necessary to kill Lane in order to protect Imogen. She went to the family farm where he lives; however, Lane overpowers her and tortures Percival to death in an attempt to discover Imogen's whereabouts, then kidnaps his own daughter, Karen, to lure Imogen back to him. When confronted by the police, he shoots DI Warren dead. Nikki saves Jack's life when Lane arrives at the scene of the kidnap, at which Lane attacks them as they are freeing Karen. While being taken away, Lane shows that he still cares for Imogen, who remains terrified of him. Henderson is reunited with his daughter.
138	7	"Legacy, Part 1"	David Richards	Stephen Gallagher	31 January 2013	7.49
When Tom Hancock's son Peter dies of cancer, Tom seeks an explanation and turns to Leo to help him find the cause. At about the same time, the decomposing body of Colin Connor is discovered in an old nursing home, about to be converted into ecologically-friendly apartments while the adjoining farmland is to be used for affordable housing. Behind the scheme is Lord Embleton, a government minister who is attracted to Nikki after meeting her at a function. Embleton's father, Sir William, tries to discourage him from the scheme, and is in secret contact with a sinister government "adviser", David Loader. Leo is intrigued by the post-mortem discovery that both Colin and Peter had the extremely rare Fanconi's Syndrome and begins to think that Tom Hancock's suspicions may be well-founded. Jack finds evidence to suggest that Colin was in the disused building with a companion, who left him to die after his arm became trapped in a conduit while trying to steal copper wire. Suspicion falls on Colin's employer, Brian Blackburn, and his son Derren, who appears to have undergone a personality change since his association with Colin. Leo and Jack visit the deserted farm to look for evidence of contamination but are taken into custody by soldiers who claim that the land is in use as an army firing range. On their return, Jack scrapes their shoes and finds evidence of groundwater contamination. Leo is contacted by the farm's former owner, George Ryder, who says that he has information about the cause of the contamination, but when they attempt to meet at the old nursing home, Leo finds Ryder's dead body and sees Derren running away.
139	8	"Legacy, Part 2"	David Richards	Stephen Gallagher	1 February 2013	7.24
During a police search for him, Derren falls off a ladder and dies; the post-mortem reveals that he was suffering from similar symptoms to Colin and Peter. Jack suspects that Derren was not responsible for Ryder's death, and finds evidence that implicates David Loader. Meanwhile, after Leo's house is burgled, he is suspended for allegedly losing confidential files, which he said he would never bring home and suggests that this was a set-up. Nikki tries to get help from Lord Embleton, with whom she is having an affair, but Embleton's father tries to stop him becoming involved with her. Leo seeks help from Tom Hancock, and they go to the farm again and discover the source of the radioactive contamination: a tunnelfire with a train carrying a nuclear warhead. In there, they also found evidence that children have been visiting the area to play and spend time. When Leo finds a video in Tom's basement revealing that his son and several other local boys had been in the tunnel without realising the danger, Tom takes a parcel of radioactive dust and threatens Sir William, who shows no remorse for covering up the disaster. Lord Embleton and David Loader enter Embleton's private office, not knowing that Tom has booby-trapped it, and both are covered in a fatal dose of radioactive dust from the tunnel. In the final scene, Leo walks back into his office, watched by Nikki, Jack and Clarissa.
140	9	"Greater Love, Part 1"	Douglas Mackinnon	Dudi Appleton & Jim Keeble	7 February 2013	6.92
After human remains are found at an Afghan water project, the brother of missing soldier Dan Lambert begs Leo to go to Afghanistan to prepare the body for repatriation and discover whatever they can about how he died. Nikki and Jack go with him, and almost immediately encounter apparent hostility from private security guards working at the site. Their leader, Sean Nugent, is reluctant to allow contact with three Taliban prisoners, and appears to be losing control of his men when one of the prisoners is found hanged in his cell; Nikki suspects that one of the other guards is responsible, and discovers that one of the prisoners, "Karim", is an Englishman. Leo develops a relationship with Fawzia, the Afghan charity worker responsible for the water project, and is assaulted one night outside the compound. Evidence begins to point towards Lambert having been killed by friendly fire. Clarissa interviews Scott Lambert again, and discovers that Nugent was an NCO with the original military team of which Dan was a member; her e-mail is concealed from Leo by Nugent.
141	10	"Greater Love, Part 2"	Douglas Mackinnon	Dudi Appleton & Jim Keeble	8 February 2013	6.60
While Jack is investigating decomposition rates in the local climatic conditions, he comes across further parts of Lambert's body. In the meantime, Leo and Nikki are accidentally locked in the cell with Karim and the other Taliban prisoner, and Karim appears to confess to having been involved in Lambert's killing. After Nugent takes the prisoners to be handed over to the local authorities, Jack realises that the body parts are not Lambert's at all, and that "Karim" is, in fact, Lambert himself. By the time he alerts the guards, the prisoners have murdered Nugent and escaped. At the opening of the new water project, Leo spots Karim/Lambert in disguise, and discovers that he is intending to carry out a suicide attack. As Leo walks him away from the site, the explosives are detonated.

=== Series 17 (2014) ===
This series saw the introduction of Dr. Thomas Chamberlain, portrayed by Richard Lintern.

No. overall	No. in series	Title	Directed by	Written by	Original release date	UK viewers (millions)
142	1	"Commodity, Part 1"	Daniel O'Hara	Timothy Prager	2 January 2014	7.92
143	2	"Commodity, Part 2"	Daniel O'Hara	Timothy Prager	3 January 2014	7.84
144	3	"Coup de Grace, Part 1"	David Richards	Graham Mitchell	9 January 2014	7.20
145	4	"Coup de Grace, Part 2"	David Richards	Graham Mitchell	10 January 2014	7.33
146	5	"In a Lonely Place, Part 1"	Craig Viveiros	Ed Whitmore & Tracey Malone	16 January 2014	7.59
Following the discovery of a young woman's corpse in a forest, Nikki and Jack travel to Scotland to assist DS Jason Ross, who mistrusts local pathologist Dr Jenkins. The prime suspect is hunter and gunsmith Niall Wallace, but he is eliminated from enquiries. A clue leads to the Manhattan pole dancing club, owned by Stella Nelson, who identifies the dead girl as Caitlin, who apparently gave no surname. Another dancer, Amy, tells Jack that Caitlin disappeared after getting into a car with a stranger, but the local police, including obnoxious DS MacNeil and DI Laing, were not interested when she reported Caitlin missing. Five more female corpses are discovered in the forest, denoting a serial killer. When news of the murders becomes public, Sarah O'Keefe tells her boyfriend, Steve Boyd, that some years earlier she escaped a rapist and would-be killer in the same forest but, as she goes to tell the police, she is abducted again.
147	6	"In a Lonely Place, Part 2"	Craig Viveiros	Ed Whitmore & Tracey Malone	17 January 2014	7.59
Nikki and Jack, joined by the apparently decent Dr Jenkins, unearth more bodies, leading to Niall's being rearrested. Steve Boyd reports girlfriend, Sarah, missing, revealing to Jack what she had told him about her previous ordeal, while Jason Ross admits to Nikki that he called her in because he felt that, in the past, Jenkins had colluded with MacNeil and Laing to falsify evidence. In fact, Jenkins confesses to Nikki that he had been forced to lie because Laing spent most of his time covering for loose cannon MacNeil and needed his help. The pathologists return to the Manhattan and learn that almost all the victims had worked there, including, very briefly, Sarah. As a result, Stella makes a phone call to Laing regarding her son Jerome. Laing finally confesses to Nikki, Jack and DS Ross about his relationship with Stella and that Jerome is their child, which consequently leads to them finding Sarah alive and identifying the serial killer.
148	7	"Undertone, Part 1"	Nicholas Renton	Ed Whitmore & Declan Croghan	23 January 2014	7.23
Nikki and Jack assist DS Sally Kirchner in identifying teenager Alice Preston, who was murdered and her baby taken live from her womb. DNA identifies the father as married Simon Turner, who admits to a one night stand with Alice but claims that he never saw her after giving her money for an abortion. Alice was a drug runner, sharing a flat with two other drug dealers, Mark Blakefield, who is also murdered, and Nuri Kavur, who turns out to be the informant for DI John Brooke of the drugs squad. Nuri believes that his uncle, Turkish gangster Bekir Humadi, has slain the others after a consignment went missing and fears for his own life. Brooke arrests Humadi after finding evidence at the flat but Jack believes that he is actually framing the Turk.
149	8	"Undertone, Part 2"	Nicholas Renton	Ed Whitmore & Declan Croghan	24 January 2014	7.19
As Nikki tries to explain to Alice's father her drug involvement, Martin Carrisford, the witness to Alice's murder, is also slain. Humadi threatens Nuri to locate the missing drugs, though he denies killing Alice. Nuri is shocked to find that Brooke and his wife have Alice's baby. Brooke assures Nuri that he does not know where the drugs are but Nuri steals the baby, taking it to Humadi to use as bargaining power with Brooke for the drugs or their value. Having accidentally discovered the drugs, Brooke goes to broker a deal with Humadi, sacrificing Nuri, who is killed. Brooke is prepared to arrest Humadi but Jack works out who really murdered Alice and Carrisford and why.
150	9	"Fraternity, Part 1"	Dusan Lazarevic	Graham Mitchell	30 January 2014	7.09
The body of teenager Katie Bowman is found dumped in an open grave. DI Carter suspects Ryan Kelvin, boyfriend of Lizzie Kennedy, whose daughter Hannah was Katie's best friend. He argued with the deceased girl the day she died and has no alibi. Ryan is also Jack's half-brother, whom he has not seen since he was forced to testify against him in a court case some years earlier. To avoid a clash of interests, Thomas brings in pathologist Helen Ferguson, suspending Jack. Jack, however, does his own sleuthing, showing Carter that Katie had been to a club where she met Christy Nash, a married doctor with whom she had sex. Nash's wife gives him a false alibi to protect their daughter but declares her intention to divorce him. Ryan is bailed and moves in with Jack, who now doubts his brother's innocence while Hannah is killed after confronting Dr Nash.
151	10	"Fraternity, Part 2"	Dusan Lazarevic	Graham Mitchell	31 January 2014	6.83
Things look bad for Ryan when Lizzie tells Carter that he rowed with Hannah a couple of hours before she died as a result of which he makes a suicide attempt. Nikki is surprised at the lengths Jack will go to exonerate his brother until he tells her that he was the assailant in the criminal case and Ryan took the blame to save his career. Jack pursues Christy, who admits to falling for Katie, unaware that she was a minor but some while afterwards Jack is the victim of a hit and run, which he survives. Ultimately the killer proves to be protecting a professional, rather than a personal, interest though Ryan, cleared of the murders, is not wholly innocent of another crime.

=== Series 18 (2015) ===
No. overall	No. in series	Title	Directed by	Written by	Original release date	UK viewers (millions)
152	1	"Sniper's Nest, Part 1"	David Richards	Ed Whitmore	6 January 2015	9.01
Three people, the Lakhanis, an Indian couple, and an employee are shot dead by a long range sniper on a garage forecourt – a seemingly motiveless crime. Ten miles away another victim, profoundly deaf Hannah Smithson, is also shot, though her boyfriend's brother Chris, targeted with her, survives but is unable to help with any information. Inspector Jane De Freitas, on the rebound from an affair with colleague Robert Drake, calls in the pathology team but with the sniper at large and shooting indiscriminately Thomas is concerned for ex-wife Julia and their daughter Rosie, now living with former drug user Conrad Devenish. After a fifth victim, Martin Cross, a charity worker at a school is shot the killer rings Jane to tell her that he is unstoppable. The latest killing, however, fails to show all of the hallmarks of the first four deaths, and the scene has been left in a much sloppier way than the tidy and neat arrangement of the first two crime scenes.
153	2	"Sniper's Nest, Part 2"	David Richards	Ed Whitmore	7 January 2015	8.94
Jack suspects a second killer or an accomplice may be at work. A sixth victim, a lorry driver, is then picked off while picking up breakfast at a local service station. Meanwhile, evidence relating to the murders is discovered which implicates the owner of a local army and navy store. However, as Nikki, Jack and DCI De Freitas arrive, the shop goes up in flames having been the victim of a bomb attack. Working on the theory that the fifth murder is the key to the entire case, Jack realises that the team is closer to the killer than they think and makes a shock discovery when he goes to visit the son of one of the victims.
154	3	"Falling Angels, Part 1"	Craig Viveiros	Graham Mitchell	12 January 2015	8.65
155	4	"Falling Angels, Part 2"	Craig Viveiros	Graham Mitchell	13 January 2015	9.01
With two further murders now on the cards, Nelson and his team realise they are slowly running out of time. When he goes to question local hotel worker Lana Sutherland, little does he know that the killer is sitting right under his nose. With the killer's appearance having radically changed since he committed the attacks, CCTV of the killer attacking and stabbing a shopkeeper allows the team to step-up the manhunt. It's not before the killer and his accomplice try to steal a baby do the police actually come close to catching them.
156	5	"Protection, Part 1"	Daniel O'Hara	Timothy Prager	19 January 2015	9.05
Nikki and Jack investigate when a man's body is found in a children's playground. The body is soon identified as Dale Barge, a friend of the parents of an eight-year-old child, Lizzie Craddock, who has gone missing. Social worker Louise Marsh is furious, having applied for an interim care order just days previously, aware that the child was at risk. When a bite mark is found on the body that matches Lizzie, the victim is discovered to have been a paedophile. Meanwhile, a young boy, Kevin Garvey, releases himself from a care home on his sixteenth birthday, determined to rebuild his family. Social worker Marsh has said that the children can re-unite with their mother if she agrees to split up with her dangerous partner.
157	6	"Protection, Part 2"	Daniel O'Hara	Timothy Prager	20 January 2015	8.99
When Kevin's grandfather reveals to him that his stepfather once raped his sister, getting her pregnant, Kevin goes on the rampage and the next day, his stepfather is found murdered in his cab. An infant is then admitted to hospital with severe bruising, and Marsh again applies for an interim care order. She ignores the advice of a junior doctor who is positive his parents have not abused him, and that the bruising is the result of a rare medical condition – but Marsh takes no notice and has the child taken into care anyway.
158	7	"Squaring the Circle, Part 1"	Marek Losey	Matthew Arlidge	26 January 2015	8.72
Nikki and Jack investigate when, while on the way home from his child's birthday day, two armed hitmen on a motorcycle botch an assassination attempt on Russian oligarch Maksim Bazhanov. However, during the attack, his Ukrainian nanny is hit and killed. The two men are found to have links to a terrorist organization called Free London. The senior officer on the case, DI Parkes, is being hassled by a senior commissioner to find out who is responsible – and fast. Meanwhile, the commissioner's daughter, who works for a security company that is responsible for the security in the apartments where Bazhanov is living, begins to develop a relationship with the leader of Free London.
159	8	"Squaring the Circle, Part 2"	Marek Losey	Matthew Arlidge	27 January 2015	8.41
When the commissioner's daughter is later found dead in Bazhanov's apartment, and Bazhanov disappears without trace, the commissioner pressures DI Parkes to plant evidence to frame someone for her daughter's murder. Meanwhile, Jack's instinct leads him to uncover Bazhanov's body in the Thames, and proof that Bazhanov was not responsible for the young girl's murder. When the head of security at the apartment becomes the prime suspect, a relationship between the Doshi siblings is torn apart when she is forced to admit that she was responsible for Bazhanov's death.
160	9	"One of Our Own, Part 1"	David Drury	Tom Butterworth & Chris Hurford	2 February 2015	8.84
161	10	"One of Our Own, Part 2"	David Drury	Tom Butterworth & Chris Hurford	3 February 2015	8.55

=== Series 19 (2016) ===
Clarissa Mullery was upgraded to a main character.

No. overall	No. in series	Title	Directed by	Written by	Original release date	UK viewers (millions)
162	1	"After the Fall, Part 1"	David Drury	Ed Whitmore	4 January 2016	9.35
When terminally ill DJ Max Walsh is found dead in his bath, a case which the team initially dismisses as suicide turns out to be something much more sinister, when the post-mortem uncovers traits similar to a case that Nikki previously dealt with three months ago. Nikki tries to work out the connection between the two victims. When an intruder breaks into Nikki's flat, she suspects that she is being stalked and that the two victims were murdered to frame her for her inability to discover the truth behind their murders. Clarissa identifies a fingerprint found on the back of her kitchen clock, which suggests that her former mentor, Belinda Roach, may be behind the break-in. During a confrontation at her house, Belinda ventures outside and is later found dead, having been hit over the head with a torch which appears to have been stolen from Nikki's car.
163	2	"After the Fall, Part 2"	David Drury	Ed Whitmore	5 January 2016	9.41
Having been arrested for the murder of Belinda Roach, Nikki tries to plead with investigating DI Pamela Rankin (Liza Tarbuck), while Jack tries to find evidence proving her innocence. After eventually being released on bail, Nikki finally establishes a link between the two victims. However, her life is once again placed in danger when a hitman corners her in the basement of her flat. Managing to escape danger once more, Nikki establishes that all of the events are connected to the trial of Tony Hamilton, whom Nikki helped convict more than ten years previously for throwing his pregnant girlfriend out of the window. However, having been innocent of the crime, it appears someone is trying to avenge Hamilton's imprisonment by murdering anyone involved with the trial. Can the team identify the killer before he or she claims another victim?
164	3	"Flight, Part 1"	Richard Senior	Graham Mitchell	11 January 2016	9.27
Local Imam and anti-fundamentalist Amir Aziz is found murdered at the bottom of a flight of stairs. DI Nina Ryman (Esther Hall) is assigned to the case, and immediately makes a connection to an EDL supporter seen at the mosque shortly before the murder. Meanwhile, Jihadi convert Sarah Begovic returns from Istanbul with a haul of heroin inside her. After making a drop-off at the airport hotel, drugs squad swoop in and arrest her dealer, and a call from Aziz is found on her mobile phone, which she left at the scene. Ryman is convinced that Aziz would not be involved with the importation of drugs, and once again questions the prime suspect in his murder. Her search leads her to a dilapidated block of flats, where unknowing to her, she is about to come face to face with a crazed gunman.
165	4	"Flight, Part 2"	Richard Senior	Graham Mitchell	12 January 2016	9.18
DCI Waite and the team realise that Jihadi martyr Zak Latif is still alive, and Jack's analysis of the scene of the shooting reveals him to be the gunman that shot DI Ryman. When Amir Aziz's brother is found dead of multiple stab wounds, a DNA analysis of the weapon used reveals that Latif is the dead man's son – and Amir Aziz's nephew. As the team attempts to work out the target of their suicide mission, Clarissa's analysis of dust samples found on the knife leads the team to a disused shop, which they discover is Sarah and Zak's hideout. Jack finds video footage, which indicates that the target of the attack is a conference centre right in the heart of London, which is playing host to an anti-fundamentalist MP who has previously campaigned to raise awareness of Jihadi terrorist cells.
166	5	"Life Licence, Part 1"	Mark Everest	Tom Butterworth & Chris Hurford	18 January 2016	9.11
When ex-convict David Sellars is found brutally murdered in his home, suspicion immediately lands on a recently released murderer, Joe Sheringham (Toby Wharton), with whom Sellars became friends while in prison. However, Jack later finds evidence relating to the crime in the bathroom of warden Ryan White, but he claims to have found the body after the killer had already struck. Meanwhile, Sheringham tries to apologise to the father of his victim, after finally realising that he will never escape from his former identity. Detective Superintendent Mitchell (Lloyd Owen) is then called out to the scene of a house fire. Sheringham's body is found inside the wreckage, having been stabbed before being set on fire. The father of his victim, Ted Blake, is found outside the property with severe burns.
167	6	"Life Licence, Part 2"	Mark Everest	Tom Butterworth & Chris Hurford	19 January 2016	8.83
Ted Blake is exonerated of the murder of Joe Sheringham, but later dies in hospital from his injuries. Suspicion then falls on Bennett Walker, a friend of Sheringham and Sellars who attended the same Life Licence group, run by Sasha Blackburn (Lyndsey Marshal). When Bennett goes on the run after taking cocaine, the team assists in the search in the hope of finding him before he strikes again. However, Bennett has since worked out that his boss, Oliver Bright (Robert Whitelock), a fellow Life Licenser, has committed the murders to frame him. When he confronts Bright, Bright murders his own wife and once again frames Bennett for the killing. With Bright now out to kill his final conquest, the team must use Bennett's knowledge of his crazed boss to find him before he takes another life.
168	7	"In Plain Sight, Part 1"	Keith Boak	Matthew Arlidge & Tracey Malone	25 January 2016	8.90
Teenager Helena Lubas is mistakenly shot dead by the firearms unit during a confrontation with a known gun-runner, Shaun Dyer. In an attempt to cover up their mistake, the unit frame Lubas by placing a gun in her hand. Later, a witness to the incident, Karim Benzel, is found shot dead, having been tortured. The weapon used is found nearby, and is linked to a known gangster, Nuri Saykir. Meanwhile, with the IPCC crawling over the investigation, Jack begins to notice that evidence gathered in the Lubas investigation doesn't add up. When the home address of one of the firearms officers is posted online, Helena's brother Bruno decides to his exact his revenge. Later, firearms officer Jo Keating is found dead, having been shot several times. But is Bruno really responsible for murder, or has he been elaborately framed by the real killer?
169	8	"In Plain Sight, Part 2"	Keith Boak	Matthew Arlidge & Tracey Malone	26 January 2016	8.84
As the investigation into Jo Keating's murder continues, Nikki establishes that she may have been attacked twice – and that the first bullet that was fired was the one which proved fatal. Meanwhile, Bruno Lubas' sister Julia manages to track him down, and offers him £5,000 and a fake passport to disappear – but seconds later, he is shot at the wheel of his car. DI Lawrence Cooke (Neil Stuke) confronts a young girl whose DNA is found on the gun used to kill Benzel, and at the scene of Helena Lubas' murder. She confirms Benzel's story that the firearms unit framed Helena and that she was unarmed at the time of her death. Jack realises that the gun found in Bruno Lubas' car was not the one which he saw him leave with before the shooting of Jo Keating, but a search of the firearms unit's headquarters reveals the shocking identity of the killer.
170	9	"River's Edge, Part 1"	Thaddeus O'Sullivan	Ed Whitmore	1 February 2016	9.00
When a couple are killed at a riverside picnic, the Lyell team investigate the father of the woman's son, who fell in the river and drowned running from the shooting. D.C.I. Sally Butcher (Sally Carman) is determined to nail the father, but another detective on the verge of retirement, D.S. Malcolm Guillam (Derek Griffiths), realises the case resembles an incident ten years previously. Nikki and Jack help him investigate a theory that there was a fourth person being shot at, but soon find themselves out of their depth and faced with a trained killer.
171	10	"River's Edge, Part 2"	Thaddeus O'Sullivan	Ed Whitmore	2 February 2016	8.96
Nikki and Jack find themselves hunted following Guillam's murder, but when they apprehend the gunman, they realise he is only a bodyguard for the real mass murderer. To find out the truth, Nikki urges a young doctor, Amy (Elen Rhys), to expose the secrets of her youth, but it may be too late as the killer looks to get away with his crime.

=== Series 20 (2017) ===
No. overall	No. in series	Title	Directed by	Written by	Original release date	UK viewers (millions)
172	1	"Identity, Part 1"	Stewart Svaasand	Timothy Prager	2 January 2017	8.92
The team is drawn into the murky world of illegal immigration when they are asked to analyse a lone, single severed finger, which has been sent to asylum seeker Akka Khoury. She suspects the finger may belong to her mother, who is missing. As the team attempts to question the Khoury family, they decide to flee, injuring Nikki in the process. Meanwhile, Jack is called to investigate the suspected suicide of Jamal Al Sham (Ash Rizi), who supposedly jumped to his death from a skyscraper in the centre of London. As Jack and DI Paul Renick investigate, they discover Al Sham was involved in human trafficking – but a promising line of enquiry leads the team to make a gruesome discovery buried deep in nearby woodland.
173	2	"Identity, Part 2"	Stewart Svaasand	Timothy Prager	3 January 2017	8.93
As the team begins to examine the numerous bodies found in the abandoned van, Clarissa examines a number of mobile phones found with the victims – but unwittingly manages to send a number of undelivered text messages from the victims to the leader of the gang. Another member of the gang is found bludgeoned to death on a building site, leaving Jack and Nikki to wonder which member of the gang has been forced to turn on his own people. DCI Goodchild and DS Butler investigate a recently retired Customs officer who they suspect is involved with allowing the trafficking vehicles through customs. As a second batch of refugees prepare to leave Calais, the team realises it's a race against time to save them, before they suffer the same fate.
174	3	"Discovery, Part 1"	Thaddeus O'Sullivan	Ed Whitmore	9 January 2017	9.31
Primary school teacher Lucy Chatham disappears one Saturday morning while cycling to meet a friend, and Jack and Nikki are called in by DCI Steemson (Darren Morfitt) to comb her house for forensic evidence. Meanwhile, Thomas is called by DS Steele (Saskia Reeves) to the scene of the death of a junkie, Tina Lunt, who is found on the banks of a river beneath a motorway bridge, with a screwdriver embedded in her sternum. As the evidence in both cases begins to collate, an unlikely form of corn starch, usually found in airbags, is discovered on the bodies of both victims – and Nikki, Thomas and Jack begin to suspect they are working the same case.
175	4	"Discovery, Part 2"	Thaddeus O'Sullivan	Ed Whitmore	10 January 2017	9.19
Thomas' prime suspect in the Lunt murder, Wesley Beale, is found run over in the street. The team begins to realise that the killer is becoming more and more forensically aware. Evidence found in a dustbin leads the team to name a new prime suspect, Brett Porter (Steve John Shepherd), who was formerly tried, but acquitted, of the rape and murder of a 17-year-old girl in Brighton in 1996. Suspecting that Lucy's death may be a similar act of revenge, the team sets about proving Brett's guilt – but Brett's niece Jessica soon begins to realise that another member of her family may be the killer.
176	5	"Remembrance, Part 1"	David Richards	Graham Mitchell	16 January 2017	9.36
When the body of student Lorna Katz is pulled from the River Lea, DI Heather Ashton (Eva Pope) interrogates her ex-boyfriend, Kieran Vale, who denies being involved in her murder. Suspicion soon turns towards another former lover, Aaron Logan, who was also a former boyfriend of Ruth Tresize, another young girl who disappeared on New Year's Eve 2013 from the same location. Ruth's parents, Chris and Ali (Sarah Smart) approach Nikki for help, but despite Nikki's reluctance, Ali manages to extract information from her, which leads her to carry out an unexpected attack on Aaron Logan.
177	6	"Remembrance, Part 2"	David Richards	Graham Mitchell	18 January 2017	8.60
As Jack and Clarissa try to decipher the final image taken on Lorna's phone before her death, DI Ashton attempts to locate the witness who saw Kieran Vale being murdered, in the hope that she can identify the perpetrator. Aaron Logan absconds from hospital and enlists his brother Ben's help to try and prove his innocence. Jack is shocked to discover Ali's fingerprints in the boatyard where they suspect her daughter was buried, and it soon transpires that Ruth may have stumbled upon her mum's affair with Ben. As the killer's identity is finally revealed, Jack and Nikki begin the search for Ruth's body.
178	7	"Covenant, Part 1"	David Drury	Richard Davidson	23 January 2017	9.16
A seemingly routine road accident, which results in the death of father and son Bill and Frankie McAteer soon proves to be nothing of the sort when Frankie is discovered to have been shot three times at close range. DCI Tony Underhill (Gary Beadle) suspects that Bill's brother, Tommy (Lee Ross), who has recently been released from prison for murder, may be responsible for the attack. However, Frankie's post-mortem reveals that he also suffered severe injuries from a blunt force trauma just over three weeks ago. Clarissa's husband Max offers to help the team recover deleted data from Frankie's phone, and they find video evidence to suggest Frankie and his best friend Liam were involved in the rape of his ex-girlfriend, Becky.
179	8	"Covenant, Part 2"	David Drury	Richard Davidson	24 January 2017	8.99
With Liam Stanwell having become the second victim of the mysterious gunman, Clarissa examines further footage of the rape found on his phone and discovers that it contains additional material which confirms that Becky's best friend, Paul, was present at the scene. Meanwhile, Jack is surprised when the seemingly random stabbing of a deputy headteacher in West London is linked to the case through DNA evidence left by a third party at the scene of Liam's murder. Becky uncovers a laptop that Paul has tried to destroy, and hands it in to the police. Max manages to recover a series of forum messages from Paul to a fellow user, known only as 'Dreadnaught'. As the team races against time to uncover Dreadnaught's identity, Jack makes the final link in the chain.
180	9	"Awakening, Part 1"	Dudi Appleton	Dudi Appleton & Jim Keeble	30 January 2017	8.51
Nikki travels to Mexico following the disappearance of Lyell Centre intern Luisa in a suspected carjacking. After realising that the police are making little effort to find Luisa's body, Nikki teams up with project manager Dr Eva Vasquez in an attempt to finally discover the truth. Back home, Thomas decides to send Jack to Mexico with one strict instruction – to bring Nikki home safely. However, Jack finds himself drawn into the case as Nikki and Eva find a mass grave containing six bodies. As Federal Police arrest a cartel leader known as 'The Vulture' for his suspected involvement in the mass murders, Eva receives a stern warning to stay away from the case. And when Nikki later disappears, Eva is run down by a car.
181	10	"Awakening, Part 2"	Dudi Appleton	Dudi Appleton & Jim Keeble	31 January 2017	8.26
Jack has no choice but continue the investigation on his own. Nikki, imprisoned underground, manages to make phone contact with Jack. She estimates her air will run out in nine hours, but there is no clue as to her location. Jack receives a call offering Nikki's safe return in exchange for him busting The Vulture out of federal prison. Jack begins to feel, however, that his close allies could, in fact, be his enemies, and suspects that Eva was involved in Nikki's abduction. He arranges the exchange with the Cartel but realises he has been double crossed when Nikki is not released. He discovers that Eva had buried Nikki in an exchange for Eva’s son, but before he can find out where she had buried Nikki, Eva is killed by the Cartel. Nikki manages to provide Jack with a vital clue about her possible burial site but, rather than her, he finds Luisa and the missing farm workers alive. Jack and Nikki realise that Nikki is actually being held aboveground, so Nikki breaks out of her prison and runs down to the beach, elated at being free.

=== Series 21 (2018) ===
No. overall	No. in series	Title	Directed by	Written by	Original release date	UK viewers (millions)
182	1	"Moment of Surrender, Part 1"	Charles Palmer	Ed Whitmore	8 January 2018	9.41
183	2	"Moment of Surrender, Part 2"	Charles Palmer	Ed Whitmore	9 January 2018	9.07
184	3	"Duty of Candour, Part 1"	Destiny Ekaragha	Matthew Arlidge	15 January 2018	8.86
185	4	"Duty of Candour, Part 2"	Destiny Ekaragha	Matthew Arlidge	16 January 2018	8.34
186	5	"A Special Relationship, Part 1"	Diarmuid Goggins	Graham Mitchell	22 January 2018	8.71
187	6	"A Special Relationship, Part 2"	Diarmuid Goggins	Graham Mitchell	23 January 2018	8.29
188	7	"One Day, Part 1"	Thaddeus O'Sullivan	Timothy Prager	29 January 2018	8.59
189	8	"One Day, Part 2"	Thaddeus O'Sullivan	Timothy Prager	30 January 2018	8.73
190	9	"Family, Part 1"	Colin Teague	Michael Crompton	5 February 2018	8.77
191	10	"Family, Part 2"	Colin Teague	Michael Crompton	7 February 2018	8.71

=== Series 22 (2019) ===
No. overall	No. in series	Title	Directed by	Written by	Original release date	UK viewers (millions)
192	1	"Two Spirits, Part 1"	Diarmuid Goggins	Graham Mitchell	8 January 2019	8.70
193	2	"Two Spirits, Part 2"	Diarmuid Goggins	Graham Mitchell	9 January 2019	8.44
194	3	"Lift Up Your Hearts, Part 1"	Thaddeus O'Sullivan	Timothy Prager	14 January 2019	8.62
195	4	"Lift Up Your Hearts, Part 2"	Thaddeus O'Sullivan	Timothy Prager	15 January 2019	8.44
196	5	"To Brighton, to Brighton, Part 1"	Dominic Leclerc	Michael Crompton	21 January 2019	8.86
197	6	"To Brighton, to Brighton, Part 2"	Dominic Leclerc	Michael Crompton	22 January 2019	8.77
198	7	"Death Maker, Part 1"	Mary Nighy	Marteinn Thorisson	28 January 2019	8.65
199	8	"Death Maker, Part 2"	Mary Nighy	Marteinn Thorisson	29 January 2019	8.60
200	9	"Betrayal, Part 1"	Emma Sullivan	Virginia Gilbert & Michael Crompton	4 February 2019	8.56
201	10	"Betrayal, Part 2"	Emma Sullivan	Virginia Gilbert & Michael Crompton	5 February 2019	8.50

=== Series 23 (2020) ===
This series saw the departure of Dr. Thomas Chamberlain and Clarissa Mullery at the end of the series.

No. overall	No. in series	Title	Directed by	Written by	Original release date	UK viewers (millions)
202	1	"Deadhead, Part 1"	Julia Ford	Graham Mitchell	7 January 2020	9.43
203	2	"Deadhead, Part 2"	Julia Ford	Graham Mitchell	8 January 2020	8.93
204	3	"Close to Home, Part 1"	Thaddeus O'Sullivan	Ed Whitmore	13 January 2020	8.61
205	4	"Close to Home, Part 2"	Thaddeus O'Sullivan	Ed Whitmore	15 January 2020	8.29
206	5	"Seven Times, Part 1"	Kate Saxon	Timothy Prager	20 January 2020	8.37
207	6	"Seven Times, Part 2"	Kate Saxon	Timothy Prager	21 January 2020	8.14
208	7	"Hope, Part 1"	Tracey Larcombe	Lena Rae	27 January 2020	8.59
209	8	"Hope, Part 2"	Tracey Larcombe	Lena Rae	28 January 2020	8.45
210	9	"The Greater Good, Part 1"	Dominic Leclerc	Michael Crompton	3 February 2020	8.34
211	10	"The Greater Good, Part 2"	Dominic Leclerc	Michael Crompton	5 February 2020	7.51

=== Series 24 (2021) ===
This series saw the introduction of Dr. Adam Yuen, portrayed by Jason Wong, in episode 3, who departed at the end of episode 6. This series also saw the introduction of Dr. Simone Tyler, portrayed by Genesis Lynea, in episode 7.

No. overall	No. in series	Title	Directed by	Written by	Original release date	UK viewers (millions)
212	1	"Redemption, Part 1"	Gordon Anderson	Lena Rae	6 September 2021	8.16
Following a riot at Haworth Prison, Jay Selwyn is found dead in a food freezer. Upon arrival, Nikki Alexander has flashbacks when seeing another prisoner, Scott Weston, who was responsible for a shooting at her university ten years prior. Selwyn's cause of death is deemed natural due to hypothermia, but Nikki and Hodgson later discover other signs that could imply otherwise. Meanwhile, detective inspector Dan Mason questions other prisoners about Jay, and is pointed to Lewis Harvey, who claims Jay was in debt to him, but doesn't elaborate further. Weston's mother, Pamela, fights against her son's chances of getting an appeal, something that has caused division in her local community. Mason learns from Jay's supervisor that he had hidden him in the freezer during the riot so he wouldn't be beaten by other prisoners, but must have forgotten to let him out early enough. Nikki discovers shoe marks on Jay's stomach and uses it to halt Weston's appeal hearing. Mason warns her afterwards to not try to blame the crimes on Weston alone. Pamela Weston later perishes in a house fire.
213	2	"Redemption, Part 2"	Gordon Anderson	Lena Rae	7 September 2021	7.56
With the investigation into Pamela Weston's death under way, Mason turns the focus towards Weston's girlfriend, Paisley Robertson (Evanna Lynch), who was his only contact in the outside world. Despite her having a motive for killing his mother, there's not enough evidence to put her on the scene. Nikki determines that Pamela was killed before the fire was started, and Hodgson figures that there were two fires started and they never met. Nikki and Hodgson scour through Jay's belongings for a second time, and discover cream containing bee venom, which he was allergic to. Initially Mason thinks it could have been Jay's brother Henry who planned to break him out of prison via the hospital he worked at, but Nikki later learns that it was their mother Dionne's idea. While looking through a burner phone that was found on Pamela's body, Hodgson and Nikki discover videos of sexual origin of men, supposedly of Jay and Weston. Nikki deduces that one of them was shot in Dr Taylor Lawson's office owing to a noise from the air conditioning. As she and Mason visit Lawson at the prison, another riot breaks out and they are separated. Escaping to the basement with Lawson, Weston arrives and confronts them. Nikki deduces that Lawson exploited Weston and Jay, and that the scratches on his neck were from Pamela when he killed her. Weston tries to stab Lawson, but it backfires. In an attempt to escape, Lawson is cornered by other prisoners led by Lewis Harvey and is beaten up. Upon leaving the prison, Nikki reflects on human nature and the cause for redemption.
214	3	"Bad Love, Part 1"	Delyth Thomas	Susan Everett	13 September 2021	7.38
Swimming instructor Laura Jennings is murdered in her home. Nikki Alexander uncovers that she was six weeks pregnant before her death, while Jack Hodgson finds urine traces on her toilet belonging to police detective Ron Radford, with whom DSI Meredith Hughes has prior history, which she kept disclosed from Alexander and her team before being confronted with it. Nikki learns that Jennings reported a break-in some time earlier, and her parents accused Hughes of covering for Radford. Jennings' pregnancy is traced back to bus driver Frank Johnson, who kept a shed of sperm donation for women who required it. Hughes has Radford arrested for installing spyware onto Jennings' computer, who was his ex-wife. Her last location is discovered by Hodgson, and upon further investigation, traces of blood are found, later accompanied by two bodies buried under the outdoor terrace. Frank Johnson is attacked by the same assailant that attacked Jennings. Hodgson meets Cara, who claims to be his brother Ryan's daughter, making him uneasy.
215	4	"Bad Love, Part 2"	Delyth Thomas	Susan Everett	14 September 2021	7.28
Ron Radford is released on bail, but Meredith Hughes later finds herself arresting him again after Alexander and her team find DNA traces on a baseball bat that was used to attack Frank Johnson. Initially the bodies in the garden do not come through with a match, but Nikki is able to make a facial recondition of both victims and they are identified as Sally and Michael Trask. The case gets complicated when it is revealed that they emigrated to Australia, which is proven false when another couple use their names. The couple in question are identified as Joanna and Tim Garrick, who Hughes initially thought were the victims. Nearby CCTV cameras and at the swimming hall show a young man named Simon Morton following Jennings. He explains during questioning that he didn't follow Jennings, but Tim Garrick. He has investigated the Garricks on his own after Michael's mother, Molly, who is in a care home, was the only one left to miss him and his wife. Tim is arrested and Joanna flees with the children to a shoreline, where she attempts suicide by walking into the water. Hodgson, Adam Yeun and Hughes arrive just in time and Hodgson manages to save Joanna. Hodgson allows Cara to stay at his new place along with his father, and manages to convince her that Ryan isn't a pedophile. Cara later decides to visit Ryan in prison.
216	5	"Reputations, Part 1"	Gordon Anderson	Pete Hambly	20 September 2021	7.13
Dr Arnie Rahul is found murdered in an operation theatre after having taken a break from a surgery. Detective Inspector Ruth Cracknell and Detective Sargent Steve Galloway discover a note with Linda Fletcher's fingerprints on it, which stemmed from her husband Harry having recently died during a surgery conducted by Rahul. Hodgson comes up with a plan to find the bloody scrubs used during Rahul's murder, which is identified to have been used by cleaner Simi Jacobs. However, owing to the lack of evidence against him, he's released, until Nikki Alexander discovers more certain evidence that puts him at the scene. At. Jude's Hospital Director Emily Braithwaite asks Adam to conduct Harry Fletcher's autopsy, hoping it would clear Rahul's name; however, his conclusion is that Rahul was incompetent during Fletcher's surgery, angering her. He also abruptly resigns, revealing that his CV was falsified and keeps his distance from Alexander and Hodgson for a while. Alexander and the investigators become puzzled when it's specified that Wilfred Okoye's DNA is found at the murder scene, despite him having actually been under anaesthetic at the time.
217	6	"Reputations, Part 2"	Gordon Anderson	Pete Hambly	21 September 2021	6.87
An attempt is made to kill Wilfred Okoye in his hospital bed and Cracknell has him transferred for his own safety. Nikki and Hodgson discover that the attempt on Okoye's life was done with a syringe full of bacteria, which proves enough for him to eventually die. Simi Jacobs arrives to identify Okoye's body, but prior to his arrival, Hodgson Alexander and Adam, who reluctantly decides to help them after several missed calls from Nikki; deduce that Simi has a bone marrow transplant from Okoye, explaining how his DNA ended up at the crime scene. Jacobs explains to Cracknell that he has bluffed to Rahul in order to get his attention and to hopefully pressure him not to conduct Harry Fletcher's surgery, arguing it was self defence. The team also learns that Okoye's village was floated with stem cells from leukaemia, for which he was treated for in the UK. Adam theorises that Braithwaite, who is his god mother, had deliberately planted the stem cells in Okoye's village in able to have a continuous source to take it from. He, Nikki and Cracknell present this to Braithwaite's rival, Adrian Crowley of the Crowley Institute, who agrees with their theory. Cracknell and Galloway agree that Braithwaite conspired to kill Rahul, but she is found dead in her own home. Adam later deduces that this was caused by a deliberated lack of flow of oxygen through her air condition. He concludes that Crowley was responsible for it and confronts him. He alerts Alexander and Hodgson to the institute, and is run over by Crowley, who attempts to escape. The police manage to stop him in his tracks and arrest him. Adam dies of his injuries.
218	7	"Brother's Keeper, Part 1"	Paulette Randall	Marteinn Thorisson	27 September 2021	7.17
A young couple attempt to steal a car when the body of a young man lands on the roof. Jack Hodgson discovers that the man frequented a local gym, and together with Detective Inspector Lisa Brodle, discover that their victim is Kieran Johnson. Nikki Alexander brings in archeologist Simone Tyler to assist with soil and similar traces in their investigation. Hodgson discovers a note in his locker that points them to one of Johnson's daughter's stuffed animals, which contains a flash drive. On it is footage of Lee Coogan speaking to boxing sponsor Glen Scowcroft, who Brodle thinks could have been blackmailed by Johnson. At Johnson's home, they discover a condom in the bathroom garbage, which was used by Johnson's brother Noah, who had an affair with Kieran's wife. Lee is in debt to car washer Vanessa Lloyd, and has his fingers cut off when he fails to pay his debts for his brother Ben to continue fighting in illegal boxing. Hodgson's brother Ryan is released on parole, but shortly after discovers a gun among his belongings. Ryan in turn confronts him about his paternity tests. Ryan later escapes, steals their father's money and credit card. Ben Coogan reluctantly continues illegal boxing, but freezes during a match. After leaving, he escapes wounded before being hit by a car against a container.
219	8	"Brother's Keeper, Part 2"	Paulette Randall	Marteinn Thorisson	28 September 2021	6.95
Simone Tyler determines that Ben Coogan travelled through several fields, possibly from a nearby farm before stopping where he was killed. Upon further analysis, this is narrowed down to an abandoned farm, where a makeshift boxing ring is discovered. Hodgson deduces that Coogan participated in illegal boxing and that his last match took place at the farm. Once his father's credit card is used by Ryan, he tracks him down to talk to him. He convinces Cara to come with him, leaving Ryan to his own devices. Jack informs her that he slept with Ryan's girlfriend about eighteen years ago. His paternity results come back, but he leaves it ambiguous as to who the father is. He also uncovers that Michelle Lafferty took part in illegal boxing and used steroids about thirty years ago. Both she and Lee Coogan are under the impression that Vanessa Lloyd had Ben killed, and decide to take her out, but leave once they spot Hodgson and Brodle arrive to talk to her enforcer, Samuel Kavic. Forensics prove that he killed and dumped Johnson. Lafferty later fights Lloyd in her own gym, before torching the place. Tyler's enquiries determine that the shoes used in Lee's car come from a construction site near water. While there, Brodle takes chase after Noah Johnson. He arrives home at Teresa's, where Hodgson is, looking for any other flash drives in the daughter's stuffed animals. He confronts Noah and informs that forensics clear Ben of murdering Kieran. Noah had a grudge against Ben, and was under the impression that he had killed Kieran, but had instead killed someone innocent.
220	9	"Matters of Life and Death, Part 1"	Lawrence Till	Michael Crompton	4 October 2021	7.18
Michael Robson's father dies at a care home under uncertain circumstances. When he learns that he donated his body for medical studies, he protests the decision but can't do anything as his father already signed off on it before his death. Eight weeks later, Nikki Alexander and her medical students discover unusual signs that would indicate that Robson's father was murdered. DS Steve Galloway returns to assist with the investigation, but demands concrete evidence for it to hold any merit. One of Alexander's medical students, Ollie, takes a keen interest in her and invites her to a Halloween Party. While there they end up sleeping together after getting drunk. While investigating the care home, Hodgson bonds with one of the patients, Beattie Elleston. Further investigation reveals that Robson had fentanyl in his body, but died of choking. A storm ravages the country, stranding Nikki at the student party, Hodgson and Simone at the care home and Hodgson's father at home, where he slips on wet floor. During all the commotion, a care worker, Amrita Naidu, goes missing.
221	10	"Matters of Life and Death, Part 2"	Lawrence Till	Michael Crompton	5 October 2021	6.98
The morning after the storm, the police discovers and recover Naidu's caravan. Some time later, her body is discovered in a flooded field. Nikki concludes that she didn't die from drowning, and upon further post-mortem discovers that she has signs of carbon monoxide poisoning in her lungs. Simone discovers traces of chicken poo under Naidu's boots, which are traced back to Michael Robson's farm. He is in the midst of talking to her sister Hannah, who returned to say goodbye to their father. Michael explains how he was never told anything after their mother's death and how his father refuses to discuss it. He also explains that Naidu helped him, but he couldn't help her. Hodgson discovers via Nikki's voicemail that she slept with Ollie, and confronts him, warning him that he's putting Nikki's job as risk. With Galloway and Nikki's arrival at the care home, they discover that another patient, Derek Galton, also has died. Nikki discovers that he died the same way that Robson did, pointing to the same person being responsible. Simone finds traces from a step ladder under Naidu's fingernails, and her colleague Mary Thorpe, reveals that she hid in the attic, where she died of the fumes from the fireplace. Thorpe had also disposed of her body, while also giving her a second chance as a care worker following the death of a family in Aberdeen. Hodgson's fingerprints are discovered on the syringe with morphine that was used on Galton, forcing Galloway's boss to take Hodgson on the investigation. Hodgson, in secret, had put his laptop in Robson's room with the camera on, capturing the killer, who is revealed to be Beattie Elleston. She tells him that she killed Robson and Derek because they were both in pain and asked her to end their suffering.

=== Series 25 (2022) ===
This series saw the reintroduction of Professor Sam Ryan, again portrayed by Amanda Burton, who departed at the end of the series. This series also saw the departure of Dr. Simone Tyler at the end of the series. Unlike the previous series, the twenty-fifth series features one story spread over six parts.

No. overall	No. in series	Title	Directed by	Written by	Original release date	UK viewers (millions)
222	1	"History, Part 1"	Bill Anderson	Ed Whitmore	23 May 2022	7.00
Following the murder of the health secretary, the Lyell team are called in to assist by Sam Ryan, a forensic pathologist who had worked on the Lyell eighteen years before. While the team is originally happy to help, it slowly becomes suspicious that Sam has ulterior intentions for calling in the team as the health secretary's death casts light upon their health passport project. Meanwhile, Nikki is shocked when the investigation leads her to another historic face from the past.
223	2	"History, Part 2"	Bill Anderson	Ed Whitmore	24 May 2022	6.59
As Nikki faces the fall-out of her discovery, she faces difficult decisions between assisting the police and protecting those she loves. Meanwhile Sam continues to fight for her health passport programme despite concerns about data handling and that something sinister hides behind the facade. Nikki makes a shocking discovery that could potentially change the face of forensic science.
224	3	"History, Part 3"	Tracey Larcombe	Caroline Carver	30 May 2022	6.26
The Lyell team investigate the case of a woman who walks into a police station confessing to the murder of her husband. Despite the police's initial reluctance, they are persuaded that all may not be as it seems. After stealing evidence from the Lyell, Sam continues to protect her new programme even if it requires sacrificing those close to her. Another member of the Lyell team faces issues when a detective on the case turns out to be an old face from the past.
225	4	"History, Part 4"	Tracey Larcombe	Phil Mulryne	31 May 2022	6.10
Jack returns home after news of his father's deteriorating health conditions. Nikki notices that Sam may have stolen evidence from the Lyell which proves that they are testing illegally producing fake DNA. The team investigates a case that leads them to a farmhouse which places them all in danger as they realise the killer is amongst them.
226	5	"History, Part 5"	Rob Evans	Alyn Farrow	6 June 2022	6.12
The death of a journalist investigating the DNA fabrication throws up more questions than answers. When tragedy strikes Jomo's family and the Lyell is infiltrated under cover of darkness, Nikki realises they may be next.
227	6	"History, Part 6"	Rob Evans	Katerina Wilson	7 June 2022	5.92
The Lyell team begins to question whom they can trust and conclude that getting the truth may put everything they love in danger. The team confronts their threats in an effort to preserve the credibility of DNA.

=== Series 26 (2023) ===
This series saw the introduction of Professor Gabriel Folukoya and Velvy Schur, portrayed by Aki Omoshaybi and Alastair Michael, respectively. The series also saw the introduction of Cara Connelly, portrayed by Rhiannon May, in episode 3, who had previously been a recurring character in Series 24 and a guest character in Series 25.

No. overall	No. in series	Title	Directed by	Written by	Original release date	UK viewers (millions)
228	1	"The Penitent, Part 1"	Dudi Appleton	Dudi Appleton & Jim Keeble	2 January 2023	7.17
229	2	"The Penitent, Part 2"	Dudi Appleton	Dudi Appleton & Jim Keeble	3 January 2023	6.56
230	3	"Familiar Faces, Part 1"	Max Myers	Rebecca Wojciechowski	9 January 2023	6.77
231	4	"Familiar Faces, Part 2"	Max Myers	Rebecca Wojciechowski	10 January 2023	6.50
232	5	"Star, Part 1"	Bindu De Stoppani	Dudi Appleton	16 January 2023	6.70
233	6	"Star, Part 2"	Bindu De Stoppani	Dudi Appleton	18 January 2023	5.70
234	7	"Hearts of Darkness, Part 1"	Christine Lalla	Michael Crompton	23 January 2023	6.19
235	8	"Hearts of Darkness, Part 2"	Christine Lalla	Michael Crompton	24 January 2023	5.90
236	9	"Southbay, Part 1"	Toby Frow	Ed Whitmore	30 January 2023	6.23
237	10	"Southbay, Part 2"	Toby Frow	Ed Whitmore	31 January 2023	5.85

=== Series 27 (2024) ===
This series saw the departure of Professor Gabriel Folukoya, Velvy Schur and Cara Connelly at the end of the series (though all off-screen).

No. overall	No. in series	Title	Directed by	Written by	Original release date	BBC One broadcast	UK viewers (millions)
238	1	"Effective Range, Part 1"	Max Myers	Dudi Appleton & Jim Keeble	8 January 2024	8 January 2024	6.71
239	2	"Effective Range, Part 2"	Max Myers	Dudi Appleton & Jim Keeble	8 January 2024	9 January 2024	6.13
240	3	"Grievance Culture, Part 1"	Tracey Rooney	Timothy Prager	15 January 2024	15 January 2024	6.37
241	4	"Grievance Culture, Part 2"	Tracey Rooney	Timothy Prager	15 January 2024	22 January 2024	6.34
242	5	"Invisible, Part 1"	Jennie Paddon	Timothy Prager	29 January 2024	29 January 2024	5.67
243	6	"Invisible, Part 2"	Jennie Paddon	Timothy Prager	29 January 2024	30 January 2024	6.29
244	7	"Death by a Thousand Hits, Part 1"	Roberto Bangura	Ed Whitmore & Tracey Malone	5 February 2024	5 February 2024	6.42
245	8	"Death by a Thousand Hits, Part 2"	Roberto Bangura	Ed Whitmore & Tracey Malone	5 February 2024	7 February 2024	6.00
246	9	"King's Cross, Part 1"	Toby Frow	Ed Whitmore	12 February 2024	12 February 2024	6.69
247	10	"King's Cross, Part 2"	Toby Frow	Ed Whitmore	12 February 2024	13 February 2024	6.42

=== Series 28 (2025) ===
This series saw the introduction of Professor Harriet Mavern, portrayed by Maggie Steed. This series also saw the introduction of crime analyst Kit Brookes, portrayed by Francesca Mills, in episode 2.

This is the last series set at the Lyell Centre in London. This is due to production moving to the West Midlands.

No. overall	No. in series	Title	Directed by	Written by	Original release date	BBC One broadcast	UK viewers (millions)
248	1	"Exodus 20:17, Part 1"	Tracey Rooney	Timothy Prager	6 January 2025	6 January 2025	6.27
249	2	"Exodus 20:17, Part 2"	Tracey Rooney	Timothy Prager	6 January 2025	7 January 2025	6.13
250	3	"Homecoming, Part 1"	Toby Frow	Ed Whitmore	13 January 2025	13 January 2025	6.27
251	4	"Homecoming, Part 2"	Toby Frow	Ed Whitmore	13 January 2025	14 January 2025	5.89
252	5	"Broken, Part 1"	Sallie Aprahamian	Kathrine Smith	20 January 2025	20 January 2025	5.93
253	6	"Broken, Part 2"	Sallie Aprahamian	Kathrine Smith	20 January 2025	21 January 2025	4.66
254	7	"Vanishing Point, Part 1"	Max Myers	Dudi Appleton & Jim Keeble	27 January 2025	27 January 2025	5.79
255	8	"Vanishing Point, Part 2"	Max Myers	Dudi Appleton & Jim Keeble	27 January 2025	28 January 2025	5.83
256	9	"I Believe in Love, Part 1"	Tracey Rooney	Timothy Prager	3 February 2025	3 February 2025	5.85
257	10	"I Believe in Love, Part 2"	Tracey Rooney	Timothy Prager	3 February 2025	4 February 2025	5.85

=== Series 29 (2026) ===
This is the first series set at the Sir William Bowman Centre of Excellence in Birmingham.

The Enemy Within was meant to air as episodes 3 and 4, but was pushed back to episodes 5 and 6 due to events in Birmingham at the time. Creekwood was moved forward and aired in its original place. The DVD release has Creekwood as episodes 3 and 4, in line with the final broadcast order rather than the intended broadcast order.

No. overall	No. in series	Title	Directed by	Written by	Original release date	BBC One broadcast	UK viewers (millions)
258	1	"The Disappearance of Alice Hill - Part One"	Andy Hay	Ed Whitmore	2 February 2026	2 February 2026	5.77
259	2	"The Disappearance of Alice Hill - Part Two"	Andy Hay	Ed Whitmore	2 February 2026	3 February 2026	5.51
260	3	"Creekwood - Part One"	Martin Smith	Vivienne Harvey	9 February 2026	9 February 2026	5.15
261	4	"Creekwood - Part Two"	Martin Smith	Vivienne Harvey	9 February 2026	10 February 2026	5.12
262	5	"The Enemy Within - Part One"	Michael Lacey	Timothy Prager	16 February 2026	17 February 2026	5.02
263	6	"The Enemy Within - Part Two"	Michael Lacey	Timothy Prager	16 February 2026	18 February 2026	5.10
264	7	"Grace of God - Part One"	Tracey Rooney	Dudi Appleton & Jim Keeble	23 February 2026	23 February 2026	4.82
265	8	"Grace of God - Part Two"	Tracey Rooney	Dudi Appleton & Jim Keeble	23 February 2026	24 February 2026	4.85
266	9	"Shame - Part One"	Michael Lacey	Timothy Prager	2 March 2026	2 March 2026	5.03
267	10	"Shame - Part Two"	Michael Lacey	Timothy Prager	2 March 2026	3 March 2026	4.97
