= Ruby (1992 film) =

1992 film

- Theatrical release poster
- Directed by: John Mackenzie
- Written by: Stephen Davis
- Produced by: Steve Golin
- Starring: Danny Aiello; Sherilyn Fenn; Arliss Howard
- Cinematography: Phil Méheux
- Edited by: Richard Trevor
- Music by: John Scott
- Production companies: Propaganda Films; PolyGram Filmed Entertainment; Kuzui Enterprises
- Distributed by: Rank Film Distributors (United Kingdom); Triumph Releasing Corporation (United States); PolyGram Filmed Entertainment (International)
- Release date: March 27, 1992
- Running time: 110 minutes
- Countries: United Kingdom; United States; Japan
- Language: English
- Budget: $9 million
- Box office: $1.1 million (US/UK)

Ruby is a 1992 drama film directed by John Mackenzie, centered on Jack Ruby, the Dallas nightclub owner who shot and killed Lee Harvey Oswald—the accused assassin of President John F. Kennedy—in the basement garage of a Dallas police station in 1963. The film stars Danny Aiello as Ruby, Sherilyn Fenn as Sheryl Ann DuJean (also known as Candy Cane), and Arliss Howard. It is based on a play by British screenwriter Stephen Davis. Ruby was released in the United States three months after the premiere of Oliver Stone's film JFK.

== Plot ==
The film opens with Jack Ruby reflecting on his past, describing it as a dream, unsure if it really happened. The film then cuts to a disturbing image: a man in a suit has been tortured, hung on a meat hook, and drained of blood — a brutal warning to someone.

In 1962 Dallas, Ruby runs the struggling Carousel Club, a burlesque venue. He watches an uninspired performance by an aging dancer, Telephone Trixie, and laments the club's decline. Later that night, he meets two corrupt Dallas police officers to deliver narcotics. Elsewhere, a young blond woman named Sheryl Ann DuJean is seen covering a facial bruise, suggesting domestic abuse.

Later, Ruby finds Sheryl Ann alone in a diner near the bus station. Sensing her desperation, he offers her food and a place to stay, making clear that it's not a sexual advance. She accepts and moves into the apartment above the Carousel Club. The next day, Ruby talks to Diego, his Cuban exile bartender, about the club's grim prospects. When a scheduled dancer cancels, Sheryl Ann volunteers to perform. Though skeptical, Ruby gives her a chance. Adopting the name "Candy Cane," she stuns the crowd with a bold and skilled routine. Ruby realizes she's no novice and that she may revitalize the club. A friendship based on mutual honesty begins to form between them.

Soon, Ruby is approached by his old mob associate, Louie Vitali, who wants him to take over a secret job in Cuba, originally assigned to the murdered man seen at the beginning. Ruby invites Candy along and they travel to Havana. There, they meet the elderly imprisoned mobster Santos Alicante, detained since the 1959 Cuban Revolution. Officially, the job is to break Santos out. But in private, Vitali tells Ruby that he's meant to kill Santos using a disguised pistol-camera. Instead, Ruby kills Vitali and bribes guards to free Santos. Ruby, Santos, and Candy escape Cuba by boat and arrive in New Orleans, where Ruby gets new identity papers for Santos from his old contact, David Ferrie. Candy and Ruby return to Dallas; Santos goes his own way.

Back at the club, Candy becomes the main attraction, and business improves. When her abusive husband Hank appears after a show, Ruby beats him and warns him off. Soon after, a mysterious man named Maxwell visits Ruby at the closed club. Implying government ties, Maxwell demands that Ruby start informing on Santos and his associates, giving him a tape recorder. Ruby suspects Maxwell is CIA, and though Maxwell neither confirms nor denies it, the pressure is real.

Ruby and Candy travel to Las Vegas, where Santos has opened a casino. At a lavish gala, President John F. Kennedy arrives by helicopter. Candy sits at the President's table with Ferrie, while Ruby records mobsters — including Santos — discussing a plan to smuggle explosive cigars to Fidel Castro. Later, Maxwell meets Ruby outside the city and hints at a more important target, possibly another assassination.

The next day, Candy tells Ruby she's been offered a singing contract backed by powerful figures, and she'll be staying in Vegas. Ruby returns to Dallas alone and begins training with firearms. Meanwhile, Ferrie and Diego travel to New Orleans and approach Lee Harvey Oswald about joining a job.

Back in Dallas, Ruby meets with mobsters Santos and Sam Giancana, who inform him the Castro plan is off — something bigger has come up. After Ruby leaves, Giancana speaks with Maxwell.

Candy returns unexpectedly, revealing she abandoned the Vegas job, feeling used. Ruby suspects a conspiracy between the CIA and the mob. His underworld contact, Proby, advises him to drop it. On November 22, 1963, JFK is assassinated in Dallas. The film shows Diego firing from the Texas School Book Depository with Oswald acting as his handler, and a second team firing the fatal shot from the grassy knoll.

Ruby watches the aftermath on TV. When Ferrie visits the club, he warns Ruby to stay silent, calling him a small-time hood. But Ruby decides to act. The next day, he fatally shoots Oswald during a police transfer.

In jail, Ruby refuses to plead insanity or explain himself, insisting he be brought to Washington to testify. At his trial, he sees Maxwell watching. Convicted and sentenced to death, Ruby continues demanding to testify, but is ignored. Candy visits him in prison, but he tells her to disappear for her own safety. He believes he's being slowly poisoned through forced injections. Ruby dies of cancer in jail in 1967 — his request to testify before Congress never granted.

== Order of Cast ==
- Danny Aiello as Jack Ruby
- Sherilyn Fenn as Sheryl Ann DuJean (Candy Cane) (Note: The Candy Cane character is a composite of Candy Barr, Marilyn Monroe, and Judith Exner.)
- Tobin Bell as David Ferrie
- Joseph Cortese as Louis Vitali
- Arliss Howard as Maxwell
- Richard C. Sarafian as Proby
- Leonard Termo as Tony Ana
- David Duchovny as J. D. Tippit
- Carmine Caridi as Sam Giancana
- Marc Lawrence as Santos Alicante (Note: Alicante is a stand-in for mobster Santo Trafficante Jr.)
- Joe Viterelli as Joseph Valachi
- John Roselius as Detective Smalls
- Willie Garson as Lee Harvey Oswald
- Mary Chris Wall as Jackie Kennedy

== Production ==
In April 1990, the Los Angeles Times reported that David Fincher was set to make his directorial debut with Ruby. However, Fincher withdrew from the project and was replaced by John Mackenzie as director. In 1991 Ruby's portrayer, Danny Aiello, met with MacKenzie. He explained his directorial approach to Aiello: "Whenever there are known facts, those facts will be used, and when there are not, then we'll employ theatrical license". Aiello did his own personal research on Ruby and spoke with those who had met him, such as Jerry Vale and Milton Berle. Robert J. Groden served as a photographic specialist for the film, enhancing the quality of the archival footage the film utilizes.

== Reception ==
Ruby was not a financial success at the box office, perhaps overshadowed by the release of JFK previously. The film was released to mixed reviews from critics. On Rotten Tomatoes, the film holds a 45% rating based reviews from 11 critics.

Roger Ebert of the Chicago Sun-Times gave the film two out of four stars, commending Aiello's performance and ability to create a tortured and well-meaning character, but criticizing an overall lack of historical accuracy, which he felt affected the pace of the film.

Vincent Canby of The New York Times wrote "As crazy as it is, though, "Ruby" is almost rudely entertaining." Rita Kempley for The Washington Post wrote that though the film is "rife with audacious conjecture and titillating improbabilities", it is nonetheless a "wonderfully gossipy biography".

The film grossed $919,286 in the United States and Canada. It grossed £115,698 ($184,000) in the United Kingdom.

== See also ==
- Assassination of John F. Kennedy in popular culture
- November 1963, a 2026 film that depicts mafia involvement in the assassination
- JFK, a 1991 Oliver Stone film about the assassination of John F. Kennedy that also takes a conspiracy angle.
- Executive Action, a 1973 film that presents the assassination of John F. Kennedy from a conspiracy point of view.
- Fatal Deception: Mrs. Lee Harvey Oswald
