= Two Thousand Acres of Sky =

- Two Thousand Acres of Sky complete series cover.
- Genre: Comedy drama; Romance
- Created by: Timothy Prager
- Developed by: BBC Drama Group; Zenith Entertainment
- Written by: Timothy Prager
- Starring: Michelle Collins; Paul Kaye; John Straiton
- Country of origin: United Kingdom
- Original language: English
- No. of series: 3
- No. of episodes: 22

Production
- Running time: 48 minutes (series 1); 60 minutes (series 2–3)

Original release
- Network: BBC One
- Release: 1 January 2001 – 21 February 2003

Related
- Himmelblå

Two Thousand Acres of Sky is a British television drama series which aired on BBC One from 2001 to 2003. It was created and written by Timothy Prager. The Executive Producer was Adrian Bate.

The show takes place on the fictional island of Ronansay off the coast of Skye. The actual filming location was the sea-side village of Port Logan.

In 2008, the Norwegian Broadcasting Corporation created a remake of the series called Himmelblå (Norwegian for 'Sky Blue') taking place on the island of Ylvingen.

== Premise ==
=== Series 1 ===
Abby is a divorced mother living in London with her two children. She sees an advertisement for a family with two children to run a B&B on an island off in the Inner Hebrides, near Skye, called Ronansay. The islanders have posted the advert as their local school is due to close due to only three children attending: they need an extra two children to keep the school open. Abby persuades her friend Kenny to pretend to be her husband and they are successful in their application to move to the island.

=== Series 2 ===
Abby begins a relationship with a local fisherman, called Alistair. Kenny finds this relationship difficult as he is secretly in love with Abby. Kenny in turn begins a relationship with a local girl.

=== Series 3 ===
After Abby and Alistair end their relationship, Kenny invites Abby's ex-husband Robbie from London to stay. Abby and Robbie decide to give their relationship another chance, so Kenny decides to leave the island.

== Cast ==
- Michelle Collins as Abby Wallace
- Paul Kaye as Kenny Marsh
- Philip Dowling as Alfie Wallace
- Charlotte Graham as Charley Wallace
- Monica Gibb as Mary Raeburn
- Michael Carter as Douglas Raeburn
- John Straiton as Alister McLeod
- Karen Westwood as Carolyn Fraser
- George Anton as Malcolm Campbell
- Paul Ireland as Colin Campbell
- Sarah Lam as Ida Macasaet
- Sean Scanlan as Gordon Macphee
- Elaine C. Smith as Marjorie McGowan
- Jenny Foulds as Heather McGowan
- Andy Gray as Jerry Kennedy, a.k.a. Big Jerry
- Jonathyn Smith as Little Jerry
- Henry Ian Cusick as Dr. Talbot
- Michael Hodgson as Robbie Leonard
- Gerald Lepkowski as Hamish Raeburn
- Ashley Jensen as Angie Raeburn
- Iona Donnelly as Hamish & Angie's Daughter
- Samantha Henderson as Hamish & Angie's Youngest Daughter

== Episodes ==
Series	Episodes	Originally released	
Series	Episodes	First released	Last released
1	6	1 January 2001	25 January 2001
2	8	4 January 2002	22 February 2002
3	8	3 January 2003	21 February 2003

=== Series 1 (2001) ===
No. overall	No. in series	Title	Directed by	Written by	Original release date	UK viewers (millions)
1	1	"Episode 1"	Robert Knights	Timothy Prager	1 January 2001	7.83
2	2	"Episode 2"	Robert Knights	Timothy Prager	4 January 2001	6.60
3	3	"Episode 3"	Robert Knights	Timothy Prager	8 January 2001	7.06
4	4	"Episode 4"	Robert Knights	Timothy Prager	11 January 2001	<6.20
5	5	"Episode 5"	Dermot Boyd	Timothy Prager	18 January 2001	<6.09
6	6	"Episode 6"	Dermot Boyd	Timothy Prager	25 January 2001	5.94

=== Series 2 (2002) ===
No. overall	No. in series	Title	Directed by	Written by	Original release date	UK viewers (millions)
7	1	"Episode 1"	Roger Gartland	Timothy Prager	4 January 2002	6.81
8	2	"Episode 2"	Roger Gartland	Timothy Prager	11 January 2002	5.97
9	3	"Episode 3"	Roger Gartland	Timothy Prager	18 January 2002	6.07
10	4	"Episode 4"	Dermot Boyd	Timothy Prager	25 January 2002	5.41
11	5	"Episode 5"	Dermot Boyd	Timothy Prager	1 February 2002	5.65
12	6	"Episode 6"	Renny Rye	Timothy Prager	8 February 2002	5.46
13	7	"Episode 7"	Renny Rye	Timothy Prager	15 February 2002	5.98
14	8	"Episode 8"	Renny Rye	Timothy Prager	22 February 2002	5.44

=== Series 3 (2003) ===
No. overall	No. in series	Title	Directed by	Written by	Original release date	UK viewers (millions)
15	1	"Episode 1"	Dermot Boyd	Timothy Prager	3 January 2003	5.91
16	2	"Episode 2"	Dermot Boyd	Timothy Prager	10 January 2003	6.03
17	3	"Episode 3"	Dermot Boyd	Timothy Prager	17 January 2003	5.63
18	4	"Episode 4"	Renny Rye	Timothy Prager	24 January 2003	5.48
19	5	"Episode 5"	Renny Rye	Timothy Prager	31 January 2003	<5.68
20	6	"Episode 6"	Renny Rye	Timothy Prager	7 February 2003	<5.43
21	7	"Episode 7"	Morag Fullerton	Timothy Prager	14 February 2003	<5.88
22	8	"Episode 8"	Morag Fullerton	Timothy Prager	21 February 2003	<5.73

== Home media ==
DVD title	Release date (Region 2)	No. of discs	BBFC rating
The Complete First Series	24 May 2004	2	12
The Complete Second Series	20 September 2004	2	PG
The Complete Third Series	27 June 2005	2	12
The Complete Series 1–3	19 September 2005	6	12
The Complete Series 1–3 (repackage)	14 September 2015	6	12
