= Timothy Prager =

British television and film writer

Timothy "Tim" Prager, is a British television and film writer.

A graduate of Dartmouth College in the United States and the London Academy of Music and Dramatic Art, he was an assistant director at the Old Vic Company under Timothy West. He wrote (with composer Geoff Morrow) and directed Spin of the Wheel, which opened at the Comedy theatre in London in 1987, giving Maria Friedman her West End debut.

== Television ==
Prager has written extensively for television, including episodes of Dalziel and Pascoe, Dangerfield, The Ambassador and Silent Witness. He has created three series for the BBC: Safe and Sound, Two Thousand Acres of Sky and 55 Degrees North (known as The Night Detective in North America).

His 2003 television film Hear the Silence, starring Juliet Stevenson and Hugh Bonneville, covered the MMR vaccine controversy, portraying the efforts of Andrew Wakefield against the vaccine. It received widespread criticism due to its misrepresentation of science evidence, instead favouring the anti-MMR campaign. Dr. Michael Fitzpatrick, writing in the British Medical Journal described it as "grossly one sided", later accusing it of "turning junk science into drama". Wakefield's work has since been discredited; and the articles against the MMR vaccine recanted by The Lancet in a highly unusual step.

Prager's writing has received Royal Television Society nominations, and he received the Roald Dahl prize for Two Thousand Acres of Sky.

== Cinema ==
His feature-length credits include The Maid with Martin Sheen and Jacqueline Bisset; If the Shoe Fits starring Rob Lowe and Jennifer Grey; Haunted with Aidan Quinn, Anthony Andrews, Kate Beckinsale and Sir John Gielgud; Vendetta with Christopher Walken; Partners in Action with Armand Assante.
