= Stephen Davis (screenwriter) =

British screenwriter and playwright

- Born: 18 July 1950 (age 75) United Kingdom
- Occupation: Screenwriter, playwright
- Genre: Film, television, theatre
- Spouse: Jane
- Children: 2

Stephen Davis (born 18 July 1950) is a British screenwriter and playwright who wrote the film Ruby (based on his stageplay Love Field), and episodes of the TV series Waking the Dead, Silent Witness and Casualty 1909.

He was educated at Manchester Grammar School and Trinity College, Cambridge. He lives near Stroud, Gloucestershire.

He is married to Jane Davis. They have two daughters, Zoe and Natalie.

== Filmography ==
Theatrical films
Year	Title	Role	Notes	Ref.
1986	Yuri Nosenko Double Agent	Writer		
1992	Ruby	Writer		
Television series
Year	Title	Role	Notes	Ref.
1979	The Dissolution of Marcus Fleishman	Writer		
1995	Degrees of Error	Writer		
2002-2004	Waking the Dead	Writer		
2004	Blinky Bill	Writer		
2009	Casualty 1909	Writer		
2008-9, 2012	Silent Witness	Writer		
