= List of Inspector George Gently episodes =

Inspector George Gently (also known as George Gently for the pilot and first series) is a British television crime drama series produced by Company Pictures for BBC One, set in the 1960s and loosely based on some of the Inspector Gently novels written by Alan Hunter. The series features Martin Shaw as the eponymous Inspector, Lee Ingleby as Detective Sergeant John Bacchus, and Simon Hubbard and Lisa McGrillis in supporting roles as police constables for the fictitious North East Police Constabulary.

The series is notable for moving the setting of the stories to North East England, centering on Newcastle upon Tyne, Northumberland and County Durham, as opposed to the Norfolk, as portrayed in the books. As the series begins, the death penalty is still in effect in Britain, and is used as a plot feature in some early episodes. The abolition of the penalty in 1965 is a change that is noted in the series. The earliest episodes are set in 1964, and the series progresses in approximately real time, with the closing scenes of the eighth series taking place in 1970.

== Series 1 (2007) ==
No. overall	No. in season	Title	Directed by	Written by	Original release date	UK viewers (millions)
1	1	"Gently Go Man"	Euros Lyn	Peter Flannery	—	
Embittered by the hit-and-run murder of his beloved wife, Gently plans to collect his pension and fade into a lonely retirement. But after learning the whereabouts of his wife's killer — the sadistic criminal mastermind Joe Webster — Gently sets off for Northumbria, bent on justice. There, his investigation leads him to murders among a motorcycle gang, and his reputation as an anticorruption crusader proves threatening to the local constabulary.

== Series 1 (2008) ==
No. overall	No. in season	Title	Directed by	Written by	Original release date	UK viewers (millions)
2	1	"The Burning Man"	Ciaran Donnelly	Peter Flannery	13 July 2008	4.80
After an unidentified badly burnt body is found near an RAF base in 1964, Gently works alongside Special Branch officers who suspect the victim was involved with the IRA. However, the discovery that a large cache of guns has gone missing turns the case into a large hostage situation. Adapted from the novel Gently Where the Roads Go, published in 1962.
3	2	"Bomber's Moon"	Ciaran Donnelly	Mick Ford	20 July 2008	4.59
When the beaten body of wealthy German businessman Gunter Schmeikel is discovered in the harbour, Gently and Bacchus are forced to consider whether a barman's anti-German sentiments are a motive for murder. However, the case takes a sinister turn when a key witness to Schmeikel's death is revealed to be a killer trained by United Kingdom Special Forces. Adapted from the novel Bomber's Moon, published in 1994.

== Series 2 (2009) ==
The show's title is changed to 'Inspector' George Gently.

No. overall	No. in season	Title	Directed by	Written by	Original release date	UK viewers (millions)
4	1	"Gently with the Innocents"	Daniel O'Hara	Peter Flannery	3 May 2009	6.47
When an old man is killed on the grounds of his seemingly dilapidated mansion, Gently and Bacchus dig deeper into the history of the former children's home and soon have their prime suspect, Harry Carson, a man who once lived there. But it becomes clear that some of the locals, including property developer Cora Davidson, have something to hide from the duo.
5	2	"Gently in the Night"	Daniel O'Hara	Peter Flannery	10 May 2009	5.81
Bacchus and Gently hunt for the murderer of a woman whose body is discovered laid out in a local church. As the investigation progresses, it turns out the victim was a waitress working at the first hostess club in Newcastle – a club that has greatly upset the local religious community opposing it.
6	3	"Gently in the Blood"	Ciaran Donnelly	Peter Flannery	17 May 2009	6.02
Bacchus and Gently investigate a consignment of stolen passports, but the case takes an unexpected turn when a woman linked to the crime is found dead on the seashore with her mixed-race infant son lying near by. As the cops follow a lead on the murder victim's ex-boyfriend, they encounter racial prejudice and are drawn into an underground world of gang wars within the Arab community.
7	4	"Gently Through the Mill"	Ciaran Donnelly	Mick Ford	24 May 2009	5.17
Bacchus and Gently arrive in a small town to investigate when a mill manager is found hanged in what seems to be a suicide case. However, the detectives begin to suspect foul play as they discover money has gone missing and the widow reveals her husband was having an affair. Also, Bacchus and Gently are at odds with each other over a training course Bacchus wants to take that he thinks will help him in his career.

== Series 3 (2010) ==
No. overall	No. in season	Title	Directed by	Written by	Original release date	UK viewers (millions)
8	1	"Gently Evil"	Daniel O'Hara	Peter Flannery	26 September 2010	5.93
A young woman's body is found in a seemingly idyllic Northumberland coastal village in 1966, and the subsequent investigation leads Gently and Bacchus to suspect the victim's estranged husband is responsible for the killing. However, they soon come to realise her disturbed family is hiding an even more shocking secret.
9	2	"Peace and Love"	Daniel O'Hara	Jimmy Gardner	3 October 2010	5.52
In the summer of 1966, the Northumbrian police come under increasing media scrutiny, as Sunderland prepares to host a World Cup match involving the USSR, while peace campaigners protest against the proposed landing of the Polaris nuclear submarine at Jarrow docks. When an academic is found dead after a CND rally, Gently and Bacchus are dispatched to Durham University to investigate his background – and find themselves in the midst of a wave of social and sexual rebellion.

== Series 4 (2011) ==
The show's theme song and opening credits sequence no longer appear starting with this series.

No. overall	No. in season	Title	Directed by	Written by	Original release date	UK viewers (millions)
10	1	"Gently Upside Down"	Nicholas Renton	Peter Flannery and Stewart Harcourt	4 September 2011	7.09
A schoolgirl's killing brings Gently into the alien world of pop and media celebrity when it turns out the victim's best friend is a rising young TV star. Bacchus suspects the dead girl's music teacher, since rumours persist that she was having an affair with him. But when it seems everyone has a different opinion of the girl, Gently must uncover these different faces to get to the truth of her murder.
11	2	"Goodbye China"	Gillies MacKinnon	Peter Flannery	11 September 2011	7.20
The detective looks into the suspicious death of an old friend and informant nicknamed "China", when he is told conflicting reasons for the man's demise by the coroner and the nurse who tended him in his final few hours. The investigation leads Gently to the local police station, where it becomes clear the officers are hiding something – and to complicate matters, the disappearance of a teenage boy is also linked to the case.

== Series 5 (2012) ==
No. overall	No. in season	Title	Directed by	Written by	Original release date	UK viewers (millions)
12	1	"Gently Northern Soul"	Gillies MacKinnon	David Kane	26 August 2012	6.89
In Durham, the haven of equality found at the Carlton all-nighter is destroyed when a young black girl, Dolores Kenny, is killed. Chief Inspector George Gently soon uncovers a disturbing and malevolent racist undercurrent lurking both within the local community and his own police force. Events are taken to have occurred in late April 1968. In addition to the discussion of Martin Luther King's assassination on 4 April, in one scene characters are seen watching the broadcast of Enoch Powell's notorious Rivers of Blood speech which took place on 20 April. Reference also is made to the impending Race Relations Act 1968 which had its second reading in Parliament on 23 April. The varying reactions of characters in George Gently's Durham were explored.
13	2	"Gently With Class"	Gillies MacKinnon	Peter Flannery	2 September 2012	6.74
The indefatigable Chief Inspector George Gently and his sidekick, John Bacchus experience the inflated authority of their "social betters" firsthand when a beautiful young girl called Ellen Mallam is found drowned in the passenger seat of an upturned car registered to local aristocrats, the Blackstones. This episode features folk singing by the character Ellen Mallam (performed by Ebony Buckle) and a soundtrack including "It's All Over Now" sung by Roo Savill (written by Dan Skinner, Adam Skinner, Dave James).
14	3	"The Lost Child"	Nicholas Renton	Peter Flannery	9 September 2012	5.64
Inspector George Gently and his sergeant, John Bacchus, are given an insight into the complexities of the emotionally wrought world when the adopted child of a middle-class couple is kidnapped. Suspicion initially falls upon the natural mother – did she 'steal' her own baby back? But investigation into the Mother and Baby home itself reveals a much darker side to this hothouse of morality; and raises questions as to how far this seemingly perfect couple is prepared to go to get a child.
15	4	"Gently in the Cathedral"	Nicholas Renton	Peter Flannery	16 September 2012	5.21
The dark forces that first displaced Gently in 1964 are once more active – and have followed him to Durham. Underworld figure Rattigan, whom Gently sent to prison years ago, has been cleared on the grounds that evidence was fabricated by Gently himself, and now he is hell-bent on revenge. Donald McGhee (played by Kevin Whately), Gently's old friend and colleague from the Met, appears on the scene – but can Gently trust him? Bacchus is torn between his loyalty to Gently and his ambition to transfer to the Met. Gently finds himself suspended from duty – powerless, unprotected and persecuted. If he is to survive, Gently must confront his deepest fears and fight to the death.

== Series 6 (2014) ==
No. overall	No. in season	Title	Directed by	Written by	Original release date	UK viewers (millions)
16	1	"Gently Between The Lines"	Nicholas Renton	Timothy Prager	6 February 2014	6.48
Gently is shocked to receive Bacchus's resignation, but he soon realises that his sergeant has lost confidence in himself. To help his colleague to recover, Gently insists that while he serves out his notice, his help is needed to investigate a death in custody. The Newcastle police have arrested rioters as they tried to clear a slum due for demolition. The next morning, one of the protesters is discovered dead in a prison cell by WPC Rachel Coles. This will turn into a case that will have both Gently and Bacchus questioning what it means to be a police officer, at a time when attitudes towards the police are changing. They are no longer the trusted, familiar, local 'bobbies on the beat'. Police officers are now being seen as agents of the state.
17	2	"Blue for Bluebird"	Bill Anderson	Jess Williams	13 February 2014	6.63
Gently and Bacchus go to a seacoast family holiday camp to investigate staff and holidaymakers, after the body of one of the assistants, Megan (Pixie Lott) is washed up nearby. The colourful inmates of the holiday camp, from the flamboyant owner and his sister, to the chalet girls, performers, lifeguards, and guests, throw the investigation sideways as Gently and Bacchus uncover a story of jealousy, ambition, and the dark underbelly of the permissive society. PC Rachel Coles is now part of the support system for Gently and Bacchus at the police station, with her modern policing ways which annoy Bacchus. Also, Bacchus is trying to spend more time with his daughter, but his ex-wife Lisa opposes this.
18	3	"Gently With Honour"	Tim Whitby	Jess Williams and Steve Lightfoot	20 February 2014	6.57
In 1969, Gently and Bacchus delve into the world of army secrets when a young former soldier commits a murder in a known homosexual hangout. They soon learn he was discharged from the military for mental instability and when the psychiatrist he was seeing hangs himself, Gently believes the case is far from as cut-and-dried as it seems. In the process he finds some uncomfortable truths in what it means to serve one's Queen and country.
19	4	"Gently Going Under"	Ben Bolt	Mike Cullen	27 February 2014	6.61
A suspicious death in the coalmine in Burnsend leads Gently and Bacchus to explore the tensions and relationships in a community whose seams have been ripped wide open by politics – and they discover some old grudges that date back to the era of World War II.

== Series 7 (2015) ==
No. overall	No. in season	Title	Directed by	Written by	Original release date	UK viewers (millions)
20	1	"Gently with the Women"	Roger Goldby	Peter Flannery	29 April 2015	7.22
A woman's body is found, brutally attacked. Gently wants to catch the killer and stop him attacking again. Worried that mistakes made have been down to one inspector, he becomes keen to get to the bottom of another mystery that is unfolding within the force.
21	2	"Breathe in the Air"	Roger Goldby	Peter Flannery	6 May 2015	7.40
Gently is intrigued as to why a woman has committed suicide. There are too many details that don't add up, and he suspects murder. Why did this woman, a GP, want to end her life? Gently's investigation leads him and his team to the discovery of a bigger industrial crime, more murders and more victims. Gently puts his career on the line to uncover who is really to blame.
22	3	"Gently Among Friends"	Tim Whitby	Timothy Prager and Peter Flannery	13 May 2015	6.96
A man has thrown himself off the Tyne Bridge and is found dead, landed on a pile of rubbish. Or so it seems. Gently knows it's murder and believes it's one involving lifelong friends. Who would want to kill a man who was apparently loved by all?
23	4	"Son of a Gun"	Tim Whitby	Jim Keeble and Dudi Appleton	20 May 2015	6.71
It's 1969 and on Christmas Eve Gently is enjoying the festive cheer, until he gets news that a bank has been hit. Gently's hunt for the gunmen takes him into the world of skinheads. Gently has little fear, but the world is changing around him. Gently is later faced with a difficult dilemma. Does the law always have to be so cruel? Can he bend it just this once?

== Series 8 (2017) ==
Filming for the eighth series began in January 2017. It was subsequently confirmed that this would be the final series, and it would comprise two feature-length episodes, set in 1970, that have been written as a way to "close" the series. Company Pictures CEO Michele Buck commented: "We felt the character was coming to natural end, and wanted to bring the audience an ambitious and exciting conclusion to such a well-loved show."

No. overall	No. in season	Title	Directed by	Written by	Original release date	UK viewers (millions)
24	1	"Gently Liberated"	Robert Del Maestro	Charlotte Wolf	21 May 2017	5.62
It's 1970 and Gently and Bacchus become involved in an investigation when a body is discovered. A woman convicted of murdering her husband on circumstantial evidence brings Gently into conflict with Bacchus who was part of the original investigation and may have fabricated evidence to gain a conviction.
25	2	"Gently and the New Age"	Bryn Higgins	Robert Murphy	30 October 2017	N/A
The Met's new Special Investigations Squad boss Lister brings in Gently to investigate high levels of corruption within the force.

== DVD ==
Region	Title	Release date	Product code	Distributor	Notes	Refs
1	"George Gently: Series 1"	11 November 2008	ASIN: B001B43IUS	NTSC Format in the USA	Acorn Media US	
1	"George Gently: Series 2"	25 May 2010	ASIN: B00331RHCM	NTSC Format in the USA	Acorn Media US	
1	"George Gently: Series 3"	28 June 2011	ASIN: B004SI5VUY	NTSC Format in the USA	Acorn Media US	
1	"George Gently: Series 4"	3 July 2012	ASIN: B007S0DEB2	NTSC Format in the USA	Acorn Media US	
1	"George Gently: Series 5"	28 May 2013	ASIN: B009DS3VQA	NTSC Format in the USA	Acorn Media US	
1	"George Gently: Series 6"	1 April 2014	ASIN: B00GWXI1F0	NTSC Format in the USA	Acorn Media US	
1	"George Gently: Series 7"	29 September 2015	ASIN: B00XDBMB8W	NTSC Format in the USA	Acorn Media US	
2	"George Gently: Series 1"	25 May 2009	EAN: 5036193096297	PAL Format Region 0 in the UK	Acorn Media UK	
2	"Inspector George Gently: Series 2"	24 May 2010	EAN: 5036193097874	PAL Format Region 0 in the UK	Acorn Media UK	
2	"Inspector George Gently: Complete Series 1 & 2"	4 October 2010	EAN: 5036193099915	PAL Format Region 0 in the UK	Acorn Media UK	
2	"Inspector George Gently: Complete Series 1–6 "	4 August 2014		PAL Format Region 0 in the UK	Acorn Media UK	
2	"George Gently – Der Unbestechliche, Volume 1"	19-June-2009	EAN: 4029758960882	PAL Format in Germany	Edel distribution	
2	"George Gently – Der Unbestechliche, Volume 2"	20 May 2011	EAN: 4029759044284	PAL Format in Germany	Edel distribution	
2	"George Gently – Der Unbestechliche, Volume 3"	10-June-2011	EAN: 4029759067931	PAL Format in Germany	Edel distribution	
4	"George Gently: Series 1"	17 September 2009	EAN: 9397910797498	PAL Format in Australia	REEL DVD Australia	
4	"George Gently: Series 2"	4 March 2010	EAN: 9397911012293	PAL Format in Australia	REEL DVD Australia	
4	"George Gently: Series 1 & 2"	5 May 2011	EAN: 9397911120899	PAL Format in Australia	REEL DVD Australia	
4	"George Gently: Series 3"	7 July 2011	EAN: 9397911102291	PAL Format in Australia	REEL DVD Australia	
4	"George Gently: Series 4"	1 May 2013	EAN: 9397911234497	PAL Format in Australia	REEL DVD Australia	
4	"George Gently: Series 5"	1 May 2013	EAN: 9397911246995	PAL Format in Australia	REEL DVD Australia	
