= Rewind (2010 film) =

2010 Irish film

- Theatrical film poster
- Directed by: P.J. Dillon
- Written by: Ronan Carr; P.J. Dillon; Roger Karshan
- Produced by: Alex Jones; John Wallace
- Starring: Amy Huberman; Allen Leech; Owen McDonnell; Orlaith Rafter; Simon Delaney; Simon Hubbard
- Cinematography: Ken Byrne
- Edited by: John Murphy; Brian Tucker
- Music by: Ian Smyth
- Release dates: August 16, 2010 (Edinburgh); March 24, 2011 (Ireland)
- Running time: 80 mins.
- Country: Ireland
- Language: English

Rewind is a 2010 Irish drama-thriller film, directed by P.J. Dillon, who also co-wrote the screenplay with Ronan Carr and Roger Karshan. It stars Amy Huberman, Allen Leech, Owen McDonnell, Orlaith Rafter, Simon Hubbard, and Simon Delaney. It premiered at the Edinburgh International Film Festival in 2010, before being released in Ireland in 2011.

== Synopsis ==
Karen, a recovering addict, has settled into a successful new life with her husband and young daughter. When Karl, an old boyfriend recently released from prison, turns up unexpectedly, Karen's buried past comes back to haunt her. Karen is forced to go on a road trip and confront a world she thought she'd escaped from if she is to protect her family and her future.

== Cast ==
- Amy Huberman as Karen
- Allen Leech as Karl
- Owen McDonnell as Brendan
- Orlaith Rafter as Trish
- Simon Delaney as Tony
- Simon Hubbard as Peter
- Rachael Dowling as Mary
- Sophie Brosnan as Ailish

== Reception ==
Steven Sheehan of Letterboxd praised the performances of Amy Huberman, Allen Leech, and Owen McDonnell, saying they "hold together the tension to make this an enjoyable journey". The Irish Examiner called it "a superior Irish thriller" and lauded Huberman for her "magnificent performance".
