= Inspector George Gently =

Television series

- One example of a title card
- Genre: Crime drama
- Created by: Peter Flannery
- Based on: George Gently by Alan Hunter
- Written by: Peter Flannery
- Starring: Martin Shaw; Lee Ingleby; Simon Hubbard; Lisa McGrillis; Tom Hutch; Helen Coverdale
- Country of origin: United Kingdom
- Original language: English
- No. of series: 8
- No. of episodes: 25 (list of episodes)

Production
- Executive producers: Peter Flannery; Polly Hill; George Faber; Charles Pattinson
- Producers: Matthew Bird; Peter Norris; Jake Lushington
- Production location: England/Republic of Ireland
- Cinematography: Peter Robertson
- Running time: 90 minutes
- Production company: Company Pictures

Original release
- Network: BBC One
- Release: 8 April 2007 – 30 October 2017

Inspector George Gently (also known as George Gently for the pilot and first series) is a British crime drama television series produced by Company Pictures for BBC One, set in the 1960s and loosely based on some of the Inspector Gently novels written by Alan Hunter. The series stars Martin Shaw as the eponymous inspector and Lee Ingleby as Detective Sergeant John Bacchus, with Simon Hubbard and Lisa McGrillis in supporting roles as police constables in the fictitious North East Constabulary.

The series moved the setting of the stories to North East England, centring on Newcastle upon Tyne, Northumberland, and County Durham, as opposed to the Norfolk setting in the books. The death penalty is still in effect in Britain as the series begins, and it is used as a plot feature in some early episodes. The abolition of the death penalty in 1965 is noted in the series. The earliest episodes are set in 1964 with the eighth series taking place in 1970.

After fair ratings for the first three series, the BBC secured funding from the North East Content Fund to produce further episodes. The fourth series was filmed between January and June 2011, and was broadcast that autumn. On 26 March 2012, the BBC announced that four new feature-length episodes were being produced to be shown later the same year. The fifth series ended on a dramatic cliffhanger, with the fate of both leading characters uncertain. However, in September 2012, the lead writer, Peter Flannery, confirmed that a sixth series, consisting of four episodes, had been commissioned. The sixth series was shown in February 2014. A seventh series of four episodes was subsequently commissioned and began being broadcast in April 2015. The eighth and final series was broadcast in 2017.

== Cast ==
- Martin Shaw as Detective Chief Inspector George Gently
- Lee Ingleby as Detective Sergeant, later Detective Inspector, John Bacchus
- Simon Hubbard as PC Taylor
- Lisa McGrillis as WPC, later Sergeant, Rachel Coles (Series 6–8)
- Tom Hutch as PC Tom Reynolds (Series 4–8)
- Helen Coverdale as WPC 630 (Series 4–7)
- Seán McGinley as China (Pilot)
- Tony Rohr as China (Series 1–4)
- Melanie Clark Pullen as Lisa Bacchus (Series 2–6)
- Katie Anderson as Leigh Ann Bacchus (Series 5–6)
- Annabel Scholey as Gemma Nunn (Series 7)

== Episodes ==
=== Series overview ===
Series	Episodes	Originally released	
Series	Episodes	First released	Last released
Pilot		8 April 2007	
1	2	13 July 2008	20 July 2008
2	4	3 May 2009	24 May 2009
3	2	26 September 2010	3 October 2010
4	2	4 September 2011	11 September 2011
5	4	26 August 2012	16 September 2012
6	4	6 February 2014	27 February 2014
7	4	29 April 2015	20 May 2015
8	2	21 May 2017	30 October 2017

=== Pilot (2007) ===
No. overall	No. in series	Title	Directed by	Written by	Original release date	UK viewers (millions)
1	1	"Gently Go Man"	Euros Lyn	Peter Flannery	8 April 2007	6.33
Following the murder of his wife by notorious gangster Joe Webster in 1964, Inspector George Gently is pondering retirement. When he hears about Webster attending the funeral of a murder victim in Northumberland, he delays his retirement to take on this one last case. Paired with local Detective Sergeant John Bacchus, he must track down Webster while trying to deal with his headstrong young assistant and keep him on the straight and narrow. Adapted from the novel Gently Go Man, published in 1961.

=== Series 1 (2008) ===
No. overall	No. in series	Title	Directed by	Written by	Original release date	UK viewers (millions)
2	1	"The Burning Man"	Ciaran Donnelly	Peter Flannery	13 July 2008	4.80
After an unidentified badly burnt body is found near an RAF base in 1964, Gently works alongside Special Branch officers who suspect the victim was involved with the IRA. However the discovery that a large cache of guns has gone missing turns the case into a large hostage situation. Adapted from the novel Gently Where the Roads Go, published in 1962.
3	2	"Bomber's Moon"	Ciaran Donnelly	Mick Ford	20 July 2008	4.59
When the beaten body of wealthy German businessman Gunter Schmeikel is discovered in the harbour, Gently and Bacchus are forced to consider whether a barman's anti-German sentiments are a motive for murder. However the case takes a sinister turn when a key witness to Schmeikel's death is revealed to be a killer trained by United Kingdom Special Forces. Adapted from the novel Bomber's Moon, published in 1994.

=== Series 2 (2009) ===
The show's title is changed to 'Inspector' George Gently.

No. overall	No. in series	Title	Directed by	Written by	Original release date	UK viewers (millions)
4	1	"Gently with the Innocents"	Daniel O'Hara	Peter Flannery	3 May 2009	6.47
When an old man is killed in the grounds of his seemingly dilapidated mansion, Gently and Bacchus dig deeper into the history of the former children's home and soon have their prime suspect, Harry Carson, a man who once lived there. But it becomes clear that some of the locals, including property developer Cora Davidson, have something to hide from the duo.
5	2	"Gently in the Night"	Daniel O'Hara	Peter Flannery	10 May 2009	5.81
Bacchus and Gently hunt for the murderer of a woman whose body is discovered laid out in a local church. As the investigation progresses, it turns out the victim was a waitress at the first hostess club in Newcastle – a club that has greatly upset the local religious community opposing it.
6	3	"Gently in the Blood"	Ciaran Donnelly	Peter Flannery	17 May 2009	6.02
Bacchus and Gently investigate a consignment of stolen passports, but the case takes an unexpected turn when a woman linked to the crime is found dead on the seashore with her mixed-race infant son lying nearby. As the cops follow a lead on the murder victim's ex-boyfriend, they encounter racial prejudice and are drawn into an underground world of gang wars within the Arab community.
7	4	"Gently Through the Mill"	Ciaran Donnelly	Mick Ford	24 May 2009	5.17
Bacchus and Gently arrive in a small town to investigate when a mill manager is found hanged in what seems to be a suicide case. However the detectives begin to suspect foul play as they discover money has gone missing and the widow reveals her husband was having an affair. In addition Bacchus and Gently are at odds with each other over a training course Bacchus wants to take that he thinks will help him in his career.

=== Series 3 (2010) ===
No. overall	No. in series	Title	Directed by	Written by	Original release date	UK viewers (millions)
8	1	"Gently Evil"	Daniel O'Hara	Peter Flannery	26 September 2010	5.93
A young woman's body is found in a seemingly idyllic Northumberland coastal village in 1966, and the subsequent investigation leads Gently and Bacchus to suspect the victim's estranged husband is responsible for the killing. However they soon come to realise her disturbed family is hiding an even more shocking secret.
9	2	"Peace and Love"	Daniel O'Hara	Jimmy Gardner	3 October 2010	5.52
In the summer of 1966 the Northumbrian police come under increasing media scrutiny as Sunderland prepares to host a World Cup match involving the USSR, while peace campaigners protest against the proposed landing of the Polaris nuclear submarine at Jarrow docks. When an academic is found dead after a CND rally, Gently and Bacchus are dispatched to Durham University to investigate his background – and find themselves in the midst of a wave of social and sexual rebellion.

=== Series 4 (2011) ===
The show's theme song and opening credits sequence no longer appear starting with this series.

No. overall	No. in series	Title	Directed by	Written by	Original release date	UK viewers (millions)
10	1	"Gently Upside Down"	Nicholas Renton	Peter Flannery and Stewart Harcourt	4 September 2011	7.09
The killing of a schoolgirl brings Gently into the alien world of pop and media celebrity when it turns out the victim's best friend is a rising young TV star. Bacchus suspects the dead girl's music teacher since rumours persist that she was having an affair with him. But, when it seems everyone has a different opinion of the girl, Gently must uncover these different faces to get to the truth of her murder.
11	2	"Goodbye China"	Gillies MacKinnon	Peter Flannery	11 September 2011	7.20
The detective looks into the suspicious death of an old friend and informant nicknamed China when he is told conflicting reasons for the man's demise by the coroner and the nurse who tended him in his final few hours. The investigation leads Gently to the local police station, where it becomes clear the officers are hiding something – and to complicate matters the disappearance of a teenage boy is also linked to the case.

=== Series 5 (2012) ===
No. overall	No. in series	Title	Directed by	Written by	Original release date	UK viewers (millions)
12	1	"Gently Northern Soul"	Gillies MacKinnon	David Kane	26 August 2012	6.89
In Durham the haven of equality found at the Carlton all-nighter is destroyed when a young black girl, Dolores Kenny, is murdered. Chief Inspector George Gently soon uncovers a disturbing and malevolent racist undercurrent lurking within both the local community and his own police force. Events are taken as occurring in late April 1968. In addition to the discussion of Martin Luther King's assassination on 4 April, in one scene characters are seen watching the broadcast of Enoch Powell's notorious Rivers of Blood speech, which took place on 20 April. Reference also is made to the impending Race Relations Act 1968, which had its second reading in Parliament on 23 April. The varying reactions of characters in George Gently's Durham were explored.
13	2	"Gently with Class"	Gillies MacKinnon	Peter Flannery	2 September 2012	6.74
The indefatigable Chief Inspector George Gently and his sidekick, John Bacchus, experience the inflated authority of their "social betters" first hand when a beautiful young girl called Ellen Mallam is found drowned in the passenger seat of an upturned car registered to local aristocrats, the Blackstones. This episode features folk singing by the character Ellen Mallam (performed by Ebony Buckle) and a soundtrack including It's All Over Now sung by Roo Savill (written by Dan Skinner, Adam Skinner, Dave James).
14	3	"The Lost Child"	Nicholas Renton	Peter Flannery	9 September 2012	5.64
Inspector George Gently and his sergeant, John Bacchus, are given an insight into the complexities of the emotionally wrought world when the adopted child of a middle-class couple is kidnapped. Suspicion initially falls upon the natural mother. But investigation into the Mother and Baby home itself reveals a much darker side to this hothouse of morality and raises questions as to how far this seemingly perfect couple is prepared to go to get a child.
15	4	"Gently in the Cathedral"	Nicholas Renton	Peter Flannery	16 September 2012	5.21
The dark forces that first displaced Gently in 1964 are once more active – and have followed him to Durham. Underworld figure Rattigan, whom Gently sent to prison years ago, has been cleared on the grounds that evidence was fabricated by Gently himself, and now he is hell-bent on revenge. Donald McGhee (played by Kevin Whately), Gently's old friend and colleague from the Met, appears on the scene. Bacchus is torn between his loyalty to Gently and his ambition to transfer to the Met. Gently finds himself suspended from duty – powerless, unprotected and persecuted.

=== Series 6 (2014) ===
No. overall	No. in series	Title	Directed by	Written by	Original release date	UK viewers (millions)
16	1	"Gently Between the Lines"	Nicholas Renton	Timothy Prager	6 February 2014	6.48
Gently is shocked to receive Bacchus's resignation, but he soon realises that his sergeant has lost confidence in himself. To help his colleague recover, Gently insists that while he serves out his notice his help is needed to investigate a death in custody. The Newcastle police have arrested rioters as they tried to clear a slum due for demolition. The next morning one of the protesters is discovered dead in a prison cell by WPC Rachel Coles. This will turn into a case that will have both Gently and Bacchus questioning what it means to be a police officer at a time when attitudes towards the police are changing. They are no longer the trusted, familiar, local 'bobbies on the beat'. Police officers are now being seen as agents of the state.
17	2	"Blue for Bluebird"	Bill Anderson	Jess Williams	13 February 2014	6.63
Gently and Bacchus go to a seaside family holiday camp to investigate staff and holidaymakers after the body of one of the assistants is washed up nearby. The colourful inmates of the holiday camp, from the flamboyant owner and his sister to the chalet girls, performers, lifeguards and guests, throw the investigation sideways as Gently and Bacchus uncover a story of jealousy, ambition and the dark underbelly of the permissive society. PC Rachel Coles is now part of the support system for Gently and Bacchus at the police station, with her modern policing ways, which annoy Bacchus. In addition Bacchus is trying to spend more time with his daughter, but his ex-wife Lisa opposes it.
18	3	"Gently with Honour"	Tim Whitby	Jess Williams and Steve Lightfoot	20 February 2014	6.57
In 1969 Gently and Bacchus delve into the world of army secrets when a young former soldier commits a murder in a known homosexual hangout. They soon learn he was discharged from the military for mental instability and, when the psychiatrist he was seeing hangs himself, Gently believes the case is far from as cut-and-dried as it seems. In the process he finds some uncomfortable truths in what it means to serve one's Queen and country.
19	4	"Gently Going Under"	Ben Bolt	Mike Cullen	27 February 2014	6.61
A suspicious death in the coalmine in Burnsend leads Gently and Bacchus to explore the tensions and relationships in a community whose seams have been ripped wide open by politics – and they discover some old grudges that date back to the era of World War II.

=== Series 7 (2015) ===
No. overall	No. in series	Title	Directed by	Written by	Original release date	UK viewers (millions)
20	1	"Gently with the Women"	Roger Goldby	Peter Flannery	29 April 2015	7.22
A woman's body is found, brutally attacked. Gently wants to catch the killer and stop him from attacking again. Worried that mistakes made have been down to one inspector, he becomes keen to get to the bottom of another mystery that is unfolding within the force.
21	2	"Breathe in the Air"	Roger Goldby	Peter Flannery	6 May 2015	7.40
Gently is intrigued about why a woman has committed suicide since too many details do not seem to add up. He suspects that she has in fact been murdered. His investigation leads him and his team to the discovery of a bigger industrial crime, more murders and more victims.
22	3	"Gently Among Friends"	Tim Whitby	Timothy Prager and Peter Flannery	13 May 2015	6.96
A man has thrown himself off the Tyne Bridge and is found dead, landed on a pile of rubbish. Gently suspects a murder that involves lifelong friends.
23	4	"Son of a Gun"	Tim Whitby	Jim Keeble and Dudi Appleton	20 May 2015	6.71
It's 1969 and on Christmas Eve Gently is enjoying the festive cheer, until he gets news that a local bank has been robbed. Gently's hunt for the gunmen takes him into the underground world of skinheads.

=== Series 8 (2017) ===
Filming for the eighth series began in January 2017. It was subsequently confirmed that this would be the final series and would consist of two feature-length episodes, set in 1970, written as a way to close the series. Company Pictures CEO Michele Buck commented: "We felt the character was coming to a natural end and wanted to bring the audience an ambitious and exciting conclusion to such a well-loved show." Episode Two was originally set to air on 28 May 2017 but was postponed owing to its proximity to the general election in the UK, given that the storyline – not confirmed at the time – dealt with a controversial politician.

No. overall	No. in series	Title	Directed by	Written by	Original release date	UK viewers (millions)
24	1	"Gently Liberated"	Robert Del Maestro	Charlotte Wolf	21 May 2017	5.97
It's 1970. Gently and Bacchus become involved in an investigation when a body is discovered. A woman convicted on circumstantial evidence of murdering her husband brings Gently into conflict with Bacchus, who was part of the original investigation – and may have fabricated evidence to gain a conviction.
25	2	"Gently and the New Age"	Bryn Higgins	Robert Murphy	30 October 2017	5.38
The Met's new Special Investigations Squad boss, Lister, brings in Gently to investigate high levels of corruption within the force. At the same time Bacchus and Coles are investigating the murder of a man on a picket line.

== DVD ==
- Region 2 George Gently: Series 1 DVD Released 25 May 2009, EAN: 5036193096297 PAL Format Region 0 in the UK, distributed by Acorn Media UK.
- Region 2 Inspector George Gently: Series 2 DVD Released 24 May 2010, EAN: 5036193097874 PAL Format Region 0 in the UK, distributed by Acorn Media UK.
- Region 2 Inspector George Gently: Complete Series 1 & 2 DVD Released 4 October 2010, EAN: 5036193099915 PAL Format Region 0 in the UK, distributed by Acorn Media UK.
- Region 2 Inspector George Gently: Complete Series 1–6 DVD Released 4 August 2014, PAL Format Region 0 in the UK, distributed by Acorn Media UK.
- Region 2 George Gently – Der Unbestechliche, Volume 1 DVD Released 19 June 2009, EAN: 4029758960882 PAL Format in Germany, distributed by edel distribution.
- Region 2 George Gently – Der Unbestechliche, Volume 2 DVD Released 20 May 2011, EAN: 4029759044284 PAL Format in Germany, distributed by edel distribution.
- Region 2 George Gently – Der Unbestechliche, Volume 3 DVD Released 10 June 2011, EAN: 4029759067931 PAL Format in Germany, distributed by edel distribution.
- Region 1 George Gently: Series 1 DVD Released 11 November 2008, ASIN: B001B43IUS NTSC Format in the US, distributed by Acorn Media US.
- Region 1 George Gently: Series 2 DVD Released 25 May 2010, ASIN: B00331RHCM NTSC Format in the US, distributed by Acorn Media US.
- Region 1 George Gently: Series 3 DVD Released 28 June 2011, ASIN: B004SI5VUY NTSC Format in the US, distributed by Acorn Media US.
- Region 1 George Gently: Series 4 DVD Released 3 July 2012, ASIN: B007S0DEB2 NTSC Format in the US, distributed by Acorn Media US.
- Region 1 George Gently: Series 5 DVD Released 28 May 2013, ASIN: B009DS3VQA NTSC Format in the US, distributed by Acorn Media US.
- Region 1 George Gently: Series 6 DVD Released 1 April 2014, ASIN: B00GWXI1F0 NTSC Format in the US, distributed by Acorn Media US.
- Region 1 George Gently: Series 7 DVD Released 29 September 2015, ASIN: B00XDBMB8W NTSC Format in the US, distributed by Acorn Media US.
- Region 1 George Gently: Series 8 DVD Released 12 December 2017, ASIN: B074WTYF4G NTSC Format in the US, distributed by Acorn Media US.
- Region 4 George Gently: Series 1 DVD Released 17 September 2009, EAN: 9397910797498 PAL Format in Australia, distributed by REEL DVD Australia.
- Region 4 George Gently: Series 2 DVD Released 4 March 2010, EAN: 9397911012293 PAL Format in Australia, distributed by REEL DVD Australia.
- Region 4 George Gently: Series 1 & 2 DVD Released 5 May 2011, EAN: 9397911120899 PAL Format in Australia, distributed by REEL DVD Australia.
- Region 4 George Gently: Series 3 DVD Released 7 July 2011, EAN: 9397911102291 PAL Format in Australia, distributed by REEL DVD Australia.
- Region 4 George Gently: Series 4 DVD Released 1 May 2013, EAN: 9397911234497 PAL Format in Australia, distributed by REEL DVD Australia.
- Region 4 George Gently: Series 5 DVD Released 1 May 2013, EAN: 9397911246995 PAL Format in Australia, distributed by REEL DVD Australia.
- Region 4 George Gently: Series 6 DVD Released 2014, PAL Format in Australia, distributed by REEL DVD Australia.
- Region 4 George Gently: Series One to Six DVD Released 4 March 2015: EAN 9349055001107 PAL Format in Australia, distributed by REEL DVD Australia.
- Region 4 George Gently: Series 7 DVD Released 8 October 2015: EAN 9349055001497 PAL Format In Australia, distributed by REEL DVD Australia.
- Region 4 George Gently: Series One to Seven DVD Released 17 December 2015, EAN: 9349055003095 PAL Format In Australia, distributed by REEL DVD Australia.
- Region 4 George Gently: Series 7 DVD Released 5 August 2017, EAN: 9349055001497 PAL Format in Australia, distributed by Madman Entertainment.
- Region 4 George Gently: Series 8 DVD Released 13 December 2017, EAN: 9349055003538 PAL Format in Australia, distributed by Madman Entertainment.
- Region 4 George Gently: Series One to Eight DVD Released 8 March 2018: EAN: 9349055003552 PAL FORMAT in Australia, distributed by Madman Entertainment.
