= 12 12 12 =

2026 American heist television series

- Genre: Heist
- Created by: Dudi Appleton; Jim Keeble
- Starring: Anthony Mackie; Jamie Dornan; Jack Kesy; Agathe Rousselle; Sallie Harmsen; Julius Feldmeier; Jeanne Balibar; Kali Reis
- Music by: Federico Jusid
- Country of origin: United States
- Original language: English
- No. of seasons: 1
- No. of episodes: 3

Production
- Executive producers: Dudi Appleton; Jim Keeble; Kari Skogland; David Knoller; Jason Spire; Anthony Mackie; Jamie Dornan; Samantha Corbin-Miller; David Ellison; Dana Goldberg; Matt Thunell; Garrett Kemble; David Levine
- Production locations: Budapest; Texas
- Cinematography: David Raedeker; Carl Sundberg
- Editors: Edel McDonnell; Paul Knight; Robert Frost
- Running time: 52–60 minutes
- Production companies: 87 Films; Inspire Entertainment; Make It With Gravy; Skogland Films; Anonymous Content; Paramount Television Studios

Original release
- Network: Apple TV
- Release: November 13, 2026 – present

12 12 12 is an American heist television series created by Jim Keeble and Dudi Appleton. It stars Anthony Mackie and Jamie Dornan. The series premiered on November 13, 2026 and received mixed reviews from critics.

== Premise ==
The series covers three separate stages surrounding a heist in Zurich: the 12 months of planning leading up to the heist, the 12 hours during the heist itself, and the 12 days following the heist. Throughout, the FBI is pursuing the criminal mastermind across Europe.

== Cast ==
=== Main ===
- Anthony Mackie as FBI Special Agent Jack Strickland, a federal agent hunting the Galvin brothers
- Jamie Dornan as Paul Galvin, a bank robber and criminal mastermind
- Jack Kesy as Bobby Galvin, Paul's older brother and a gunman in his crew
- Agathe Rousselle as Severine, Paul's fiancée and mother of his child
- Sallie Harmsen as Inspector Lena Thalmann, an officer with the Zurich Police who joins Jack's investigation
- Julius Feldmeier as Alberich, a contortionist and member of Paul's crew
- Jeanne Balibar as Bazin, a mysterious underworld figure and Paul's financial backer for the robbery
- Kali Reis as Kira, a member of Paul's crew specializing in transportation

=== Guest starring ===
- Adam Rothenberg as FBI Special Agent in Charge Dan Foose, Strickland's superior back in the US

=== Co-starring ===
- Ólafur Darri Ólafsson as Blasius Holtz, a member of Paul's crew
- José Garcia as Serge Descoteaux, a driller and Severine's father, who joins Paul's crew
- Hildegard Schroedter as Gunda Erlinger, a security guard at the Lindenhof Bank who becomes a member of Paul's crew
- Bernd Hölscher as Ueli Burkhalter, the manager of the Lindenhof Bank
- Camélia Jordana as Ayah Layouni, a member of Paul's crew, assigned to honeytrap Burkhalter
- Merlin Leonhardt as Mauro Freuler, a member of Paul's crew
- Pit Bukowski as Jan Kobel, a member of Paul's crew
- Wilfried Hocholdinger as Florian Kleinmatz, an accountant with ties to Bazin and the Russian Mafia
- Georg Bütow as Captain Franz Huber, a member of the Swiss Federal Police assigned to liaise with Strickland
- Patrick Fabian as Kevin McNeil

== Episodes ==
Each episode follows a split narrative based on the FBI Principles of Crime. The theory is that a professional, high-value robbery requires twelve months of planning, twelve hours for execution, and if the thieves are not caught within twelve days, then they will likely never be caught at all. As such, each episode focuses on these three time periods: planning the robbery, its execution, and its aftermath.

No.	Title	Directed by	Written by	Original release date
1	"I'm Robbing the House on Christmas Eve While the Family's at Mass"	Kari Skogland	Dudi Appleton & Jim Keeble	November 13, 2026
On Christmas Eve in Zurich, criminal mastermind Paul Galvin plans a heist from the Lindenhof bank. He is supported by a crew that includes his brother Bobby, safecracker Alberich and driller Serge. Paul proceeds with the heist despite the presence of FBI Special Agent Jack Strickland in Zurich, whom the crew calls "the Holy Ghost." Paul warns Bobby to be careful after making a mistake on a previous job. Alberich contorts himself into the safe deposit vault to begin cracking safes while Serge drills an underground tunnel so they can extract the haul. However, Alberich notices a hidden mercury switch that will trigger an alarm if they drill into the vault, threatening Paul's plan. In January (Month 1), 12 months before the Zurich heist, Paul lives in Marseille with his girlfriend Severine and her father, Serge. After hiding for a year following a dangerous heist in Newark, Paul is overjoyed to learn Severine is pregnant. He plans to propose marriage to her, but is kidnapped by a desperate Bobby, who reveals he has squandered the Newark take, including Paul's share, on gambling debts. Bazin, a representative of dangerous people Bobby owes, forces Paul to undertake a new job by threatening Severine and his unborn child. On Christmas Day, Jack believes the robbery will take place on New Year's Eve because Paul has covertly lied about the heist date, using a source Jack supposedly has in his crew. Jack has been stationed in Zurich for eight months, having been sent to Europe after the Newark job resulted in a fellow agent being killed. As such, he harbours a personal grudge against Paul. Unaware of the heist's location, Jack suspects recurring false alarms at the Lindenhof are a precursor to the robbery. With Inspector Lena Thalmann's help, he investigates the bank and realises the heist is in progress. He discovers Paul at the vault and chases him, while Thalmann pursues fake police officers who'd attended the false alarm. Thalmann is injured while Paul escapes. However, Jack captures a fleeing Serge, worrying Paul.
2	"I Want My Halo Back"	Kari Skogland	Dudi Appleton & Jim Keeble	November 13, 2026
In February (Month 2), Paul plans the job while growing distant from Severine. Bazin introduces Paul to Kleinmatz, an accountant for the Russian mafia, who secretly works for her. He tells Paul the robbery target is up to a billion euros from his clients, who are moving assets into cash to avoid new Swiss banking regulations. Paul advises the accountant to tell his clients to move their cash to the Lindenhof, as it's an easier bank to rob than ones with newer security. Meanwhile, Jack is working in Frankfurt. Feeling guilty and desiring revenge over the death of his colleague, Sarah Niles, in Newark, Jack tracks down Paul's location in Zurich. During the job, 45 minutes have passed since discovering the mercury switch. Paul uses a video tutorial to walk Alberich through defusing it, allowing the crew to finally drill inside and start clearing the vault. Meanwhile, crew members Mauro and Jan, the fake cops Thalmann encountered, kidnap two police officers and take their places. Blasius, another member, covertly surveils Jack at a bar, while Bobby and crew member Kira break into the Zurich train network to start extracting the crew's take and oversee their escape. After apprehending Serge, Jack investigates the bank and works out that security officer Gunda is part of the crew. After Jack's questioning, bank manager Burkhalter worries his girlfriend, Ayah, may be involved, but returns to find her at home. Unbeknownst to him, Ayah actually is a member of the crew, whom Paul allowed to leave separately. Paul, Bobby, Gunda, Blasius, Kira, Alberich, Mauro and Jan gather at the train depot, with one other member dead and another injured. Paul tells them to escape as planned and heads to the hospital where Jack is holding Serge. Bobby follows Paul and creates a distraction while Paul heads inside. Realising Paul is heading into Jack's trap and knowing he is dying of cancer, Serge commits suicide by throwing himself from a window, forcing Paul and Bobby to flee. They reach the crew's hideout in the Alps, where Paul reunites with Severine and their baby. She is devastated by Serge's loss. Back in Zurich, Jack recruits a recovered Thalmann to help him. She identifies a stolen gun with a tracker that Bobby took, allowing them to see where the crew are hiding.
3	"Einfach Obergeil"	Ellen Kuras	Samantha Corbin-Miller	November 20, 2026
4	"That's How You Make a Boy Baby"	Ellen Kuras	Joe Murtagh	November 27, 2026
5	"One for the Money, Two for the Show"	Takeshi Fukunaga	Samantha Corbin-Miller & Jamie Carragher	December 4, 2026
6	"I Know Who You Are"	Takeshi Fukunaga	Tolula Dada & Joe Murtagh	December 11, 2026
7	"You're One of Us, Maybe You Always Were"	Kari Skogland	Jim Keeble & Dudi Appleton	December 18, 2026
8	"The Banks Must Pay"	Kari Skogland	Jim Keeble & Dudi Appleton	December 25, 2026

== Production ==
12 12 12 was created, written, and executive produced by Jim Keeble and Dudi Appleton, with Kari Skogland directing the pilot and executive producing. The series is produced by Anonymous Content and Skydance Television. The series had Anthony Mackie and Jamie Dornan attached to star and executive produce as well. In May 2024, Apple acquired the series for release on its streaming service Apple TV. Additional casting including Jack Kesy, Kali Reis, Ólafur Darri Ólafsson, Agathe Rousselle, and Sallie Harmsen was announced in early 2025.

Principal photography began by May 2025, with filming occurring between Budapest and Sopron, Hungary and Austin, Texas.

In August 2025, Paramount Television Studios had assumed production of the series following the merger of Skydance Television's parent company Skydance Media with Paramount Global into Paramount Skydance.

== Release ==
The series premiered on November 13, 2026, with two episodes and the rest will debut on a weekly basis until December 25, 2026.

== Reception ==
On the review aggregator website Rotten Tomatoes, the series holds an approval rating of 63%, based on 24 reviews, with an average of rated reviews of 5.7/10. The website's critics consensus reads, "Taking the heist genre for a thrilling ride, Anthony Mackie and Jamie Dornan make 12 12 12 a worthwhile outing, if only for an afternoon." Metacritic, which uses a weighted average, assigned a score of 55 out of 100 based on 14 critics, indicating "mixed or average" reviews.
