= Dracula (2006 film) =

British television film

- Based on: Dracula by Bram Stoker
- Written by: Stewart Harcourt
- Directed by: Bill Eagles
- Starring: Marc Warren; Tom Burke; Stephanie Leonidas; Sophia Myles; Rafe Spall; Dan Stevens; Donald Sumpter; David Suchet
- Music by: Dominik Scherrer
- Country of origin: United Kingdom
- Original language: English

Production
- Producer: Trevor Hopkins
- Cinematography: Cinders Forshaw
- Editor: Adam Recht
- Running time: 90 minutes

Original release
- Network: BBC; Granada Television
- Release: 28 December 2006
- Network: WGBH Boston
- Release: 11 February 2007

Dracula is a television adaptation of Bram Stoker's 1897 novel, Dracula, produced by Granada Television for WGBH Boston and BBC Wales in 2006. It was directed by Bill Eagles and written by Stewart Harcourt.

== Plot ==
In 1899, Arthur Holmwood is diagnosed with syphilis soon after becoming engaged to Lucy Westenra. Knowing that the disease would kill both him and his fiancée, he contacts an occult group called the Brotherhood, which is being led by a man named Alfred Singleton. The old magician claims that they know someone who can cure him of the disease, but for a price.

Lucy's best friend is Mina Murray, who is engaged to Jonathan Harker, a solicitor. Lord Holmwood hires his firm to sell several properties to mysterious Count Dracula, in Transylvania. Soon after his departure, his employer Peter Hawkins is murdered, and all documents about the transaction go missing. Singleton calmly confesses the deed, telling Arthur the "young man" will never return to London.

In Transylvania, Jonathan meets Count Dracula, a 900-year-old vampire. Dracula murders Harker, assumes a youthful appearance after drinking his blood, and is soon en route to England aboard the Demeter. Meanwhile, Lord Holmwood is initiated into Dracula’s cult by Singleton as part of the celebration of a Black Mass. The Demeter eventually reaches Whitby but struggles to dock during a storm. The beached ship is revealed to be empty the next morning, save for the deceased captain and some empty crates. Mina senses that something has happened to Jonathan, and Lucy invites her to stay with Lucy and Arthur in Whitby. Mina's worries are confirmed when she discovers that Jonathan was supposed to have been aboard the ship.

Arthur, increasingly obsessed with Dracula, is becoming cold and distant, and Lucy expresses anxiety over their marriage not yet being consummated. Later on, she encounters Dracula, who consoles her. He introduces himself to Lucy, who invites him for dinner. Arthur, enraged to find Dracula in his home, nevertheless finds himself powerless as the Count reveals his own predatory homoerotic desire for the English lord. That same night, Dracula visits Lucy, slips naked into her bed, seduces her and persuades her to drink his blood. Arthur's old friend, Dr. John Seward, is suspicious when Arthur refuses to take Lucy to the hospital. He then forces Seward at gunpoint to give her a blood transfusion from his own arm. However, Lucy dies the next morning, and Seward is convinced that Arthur is responsible for her sudden death.

He investigates and finds the Chelsea home of the Brotherhood, where Singleton and others have been murdered. In the basement, surrounded by crosses made of twigs, he finds Professor Abraham Van Helsing, living like an animal, who insists they must free him at once. Van Helsing explains that he was employed as a folklorist by the Brotherhood to investigate vampires. He eventually found Dracula and was released with a message to the Brotherhood: he would come to them if invited, but only if provided with property. Frightened by Van Helsing's ordeal with Dracula, they sent Jonathan instead and imprisoned Van Helsing. Seward attempts to explain this to Mina, but she is skeptical. Seward confronts a grief-stricken and remorseful Arthur, who explains that his syphilis prevented him from consummating his marriage. He arranged for Dracula to come to England, hoping that he would cure him of the disease.

The three go after a now undead Lucy while Dracula pursues Mina, who soon realises Seward was telling the truth when Dracula attempts to bite her. However, Arthur is forced to destroy Lucy when she attempts to bite him and Seward. Dracula senses this, allowing Mina to escape. Seward, Arthur, and Van Helsing meet her at her home, where they agree to go after Dracula, just before dawn, where he will be at his weakest. They arrive at Dracula's crypt, where Dracula appears and attacks Mina. Arthur sacrifices himself to Dracula to buy Mina an escape. Van Helsing distracts Dracula with a cross, giving Seward the chance to stake him from behind.

Mina has moved on and starts a new life with Seward sometime later. After Mina and Seward bid farewell to Van Helsing, who is leaving for Holland, a decrepit Dracula appears and watches the couple as they walk down the street, apparently having survived Seward's attack.

== Cast ==
- Marc Warren as Count Dracula
- Tom Burke as Dr. John Seward
- Stephanie Leonidas as Mina Murray
- Sophia Myles as Lucy Westenra Holmwood
- Rafe Spall as Jonathan Harker
- Dan Stevens as Lord Arthur Holmwood
- Donald Sumpter as Alfred Singleton
- David Suchet as Abraham Van Helsing
- Benedick Blythe as Lord Godalming
- James Greene as Dr. Blore
- Ian Redford as Peter Hawkins
- Tanveer Ghani as Cotford
- Rupert Holliday-Evans as DI Burton

== Reception ==
Critical reaction to the film was mixed. MaryAnn Johanson of FlickFilosopher.com called the film "fresh and erudite" and "a valuable new angle on an old story". The SF, Horror and Fantasy Film Review wrote that "the film does finally gain some sizzle when it comes to the scenes of Marc Warren’s Dracula seducing Sophia Myles’s Lucy but added that "Warren occasionally creates a dark magnetism, but mostly looks too cute and boyish to fill a role as big as Dracula". Felix Vasquez Jr. of Cinema Crazed said, "Your best bet for your fanged fix would be to sit down and watch Bram Stoker's Dracula, instead, and for the hell of it, Horror of Dracula, and Universal's Dracula, because they’re worthy variations. This isn't. ... It's not awful, but it's still rather anemic".

== Release ==
Prior to release trailers were released featuring David Bowie's song "Warszawa". It was first aired on 28 December 2006 in the United Kingdom. It premiered in the USA on PBS as part of the WGBH series Masterpiece on 11 February 2007. It premiered in Ireland on 27 December 2021 on Virgin Media Three.

== See also ==
- Count Dracula – Another Dracula film produced by the BBC
- Bram Stoker's Dracula's Curse – Another Dracula film released in 2006, produced by The Asylum
- Vampire film
