= Roadshow Entertainment =

Australian production company

- Formerly: Roadshow Home Video (1982–1993)
- Type: Subsidiary
- Industry: Films
- Founded: 16 April 1982; 44 years ago
- Headquarters: Sydney, New South Wales, Australia
- Area served: Australia; New Zealand
- Products: Home video Cinematic
- Parent: Village Roadshow
- Divisions: Roadshow Films
- Website: https://ent.roadshow.com.au/main/

Roadshow Entertainment (formerly known as Roadshow Home Video from 1982–1993) is an Australian home video, production and distribution company that is a division of Village Roadshow that distributes films in Australia and New Zealand. Their first release was Mad Max.

== History ==
In 1982, Village Roadshow Entertainment Limited was founded as Roadshow Home Video as a subsidiary of Roadshow Distributors. Their first batch of movie titles, released on both VHS and Betamax format, were:

- Sex World (1978)
- The Never Dead (aka: Phantasm, 1979)
- Mad Max (1979, with blue cover art)
- Insatiable (1980)
- Little Lord Fauntleroy (1980)
- A Change of Seasons (1980)
- Atlantic City (1980)
- Scanners (1981)
- King of the Mountain (1981)
- Montenegro (1981)
- Endless Love (1981)

Around the same time, the company launched a label, Vibrant Video, which was dedicated to primarily R-rated adult fare and horror films, but the label itself did not last very long, as some of the titles have been moved to Palace.

1984: Palace Films was started as a home video distributor between Roadshow, Blake Films and private investor Antony Veccola, with Roadshow handling home video distribution of its titles.

In 1985, Roadshow Home Video became Village Roadshow Home Video and Premiere Home Entertainment was established. Veccola bought out the other company's stock of Palace and it ventured out into the film distribution business and opened a small number of art-house cinemas around Australia's main cities and became an independent company. Its home video release were still handled by Village Roadshow until the late 1990s. That year, the company began picking up titles from Walt Disney Home Video in the Australian market, taking over from home video distributor Syme Home Video.

1989: Applause Home Video was established as a Village Roadshow label, with Babette's Feast being the first title under the label. Video Selection Australia was also established by Roadshow as a label for family releases.

In 1992, Disney elected to split up its ties from Roadshow Home Video and the company became an independent home video distributor by way of Buena Vista Home Video's Australian arm.

1993: Village Roadshow Home Video becomes Village Roadshow Entertainment. Around the same time, the Premiere, Applause and Video Selection Australia labels were discontinued.

In 1994, the company launched its own interactive division, called Roadshow New Media, aka Roadshow Interactive to publish software for Australia and New Zealand.

Late 1990s: Palace's home video distribution with Roadshow has been expired, Palace would instead sign a home video deal with 20th Century Fox Home Entertainment. In 2008 Palace films signed a contract with Madman Entertainment to be the Australian and New Zealand distributor of DVDs/Blu-ray/4K Ultra HD titles in both Australia and New Zealand.

Roadshow started releasing DVDs in Australia with the release of Evita on 31 October 1997.

In 2008, Roadshow started releasing Blu-rays.

On 21 September 2020, Warner Bros. announced that its distribution deal with Village Roadshow would expire at the end of 2020. The two studios' partnership had lasted for more than four decades. Since 2021, Warner Bros' films are released theatrically through Universal Pictures International, while Roadshow continued to release titles from Warner Bros. Home Entertainment through their physical media and digital formats until July 2026 where the independent distributing company, AID (All Interactive Distribution), took over the distribution duties for future Warner Bros. titles in the Australian markets that following year.

== Roadshow and Village Roadshow subsidiaries and divisions ==
- Roadshow Vibrant Video (1982–1983) – a division for distributing adult films
- Premiere Home Entertainment (1985–1993) – a division of Village Roadshow
- Festival Video (1983–1990s) – a joint venture with Festival Mushroom Records and Warner Bros.
- Mushroom Video (1983–1990s) – a joint venture with Festival Mushroom Records and Warner Bros.
- Applause Home Video (1989–1993) – a division of Village Roadshow
- Reel Corporation (2000s–) – budget division of Village Roadshow
- Hopscotch Films (2005–2011) – distributed by Village Roadshow (stopped in 2011 when eOne acquired Hopscotch for $20.7 million)
- Palace Home Video/Entertainment/Films (1984–2000) – a subsidiary of Roadshow/Village Roadshow (split itself from Village Roadshow in the late 1990s)
- Roadshow New Media (1990s) – video games publishing division of Village Roadshow, also known as Roadshow Interactive
- Roadshow-Lorimar Home Video (1985–1990) – a division for distributing Lorimar releases
- Roadshow Music (1994–2013)

== Labels ==
Roadshow Entertainment has its own label named Roadshow Films, which is in turn the theatrical distribution unit of Village Roadshow. The unit was originally formed in 1968 by the owners of Village Cinemas as quite simply Roadshow, initially to distribute drive-in pictures, often in collaboration with fellow Australian distributor Blake Films under the joint releasing label of Blake-Roadshow, and the acquisition of reissue rights of South Pacific.

In 1971, it entered a long-standing partnership with Warner Bros. to distribute and market its films in Australia and New Zealand under a joint venture, called Roadshow International.

The company begin expanding in local film production after the success of the 1971 film Stork, to start out a joint venture film production company Hexagon Productions, with Tim Burstall and Associates, and the company Bilcock and Copping, who each held 25% of its shares. The company made major hits, like Alvin Purple, which became a smash hit for the Australian film market, and Bilcock and Copping backed out of the venture prior to making the film Eliza Fraser. When Hexagon went dormant in the 1970s, the company continued to distribute local productions by other studios, including the smash hit Mad Max by Kennedy Miller, and the international film Rebel by Phillip Emanuel. In 1974, the company began entering television distribution within the Roadshow group under the name of Roadshow Television.

In 1987, it merged with Greater Union Film Distributors to form Roadshow-Greater Union Distributors, with Roadshow Distributors and Greater Union Distributors acting as subsidiaries of the unit. The company began distributing films produced by Buena Vista Pictures Distribution with its units of Walt Disney Pictures, Touchstone Pictures and Hollywood Pictures. The company as a whole was merged into Roadshow five years later. In 1989, the company begin distributing pictures produced by its American-based subsidiary Village Roadshow Pictures, a sister firm that was established that year.

In 1998, Buena Vista International parted ways with the company in order to set up its own Australian distribution arm. Also that year, when Village Roadshow Pictures shuttered its international division, Beyond Films begin representing the sales for Australian productions. In 2001, the company's film distribution unit became Roadshow Films, while Miramax split its ties from Roadshow to shift itself to BVI.

On 16 December 2014, Roadshow Films acquired a 33% stake in American film production and international sales company FilmNation Entertainment. However, as of 2017, Roadshow Films' stake has since reduced to 31%.

- ABC (branded as ABC DVD and ABC Music) (Moved to Madman Entertainment since 2024)
- Foxtel Original
- Lantern Entertainment
- Dimension Films (post-2005 titles only)
- Lionsgate
- Nine Network (mid 1990s–present)
- Fremantle
- Village Roadshow Pictures
- Reel Corporation (branded as Reel DVD)
- ITV Studios Home Entertainment (branded as ITV)
- FilmNation Entertainment
- Mandalay Pictures
- STX Entertainment Limited

=== Former ===
- Endeavour Entertainment Limited (branded as Endeavour-Roadshow)
- Walt Disney Studios Home Entertainment (1985–1992) (started self-distributing their own releases on home video)
- New World International (1983–1991)
- BBC (1996–2019) (moved to Universal Sony Pictures Home Entertainment) (moved to Madman Entertainment in 2024)
- Focus Features (2003–2009) (moved to Universal Sony Pictures Home Entertainment)
- Warner Bros. Pictures (1971–2020) (moved to the Australian and New Zealand branch of Universal Pictures International)
- Warner Bros. Home Entertainment (moved to AID (All Interactive Distribution) since mid-2026)
- MGM Home Entertainment (2020–2026) (via Warner Bros. Home Entertainment) (moved to AID (All Interactive Distribution))
- Miramax (pre-2022) (moved to Paramount Pictures International; currently by AID (All Interactive Distribution))
- American International Pictures/Filmways Pictures/Orion Pictures (1969–1991) (moved to Columbia TriStar Film Distributors International)
- Producers Sales Organization (1977–1986)
- Carolco Pictures (1982–1995)
- Walt Disney Studios Motion Pictures (1987–1999) (started self-distributing their own releases)
- New Line Cinema (1991–2010) (moved to Warner Bros. Home Entertainment)
- Network 10 (1980s–mid 1990s, 2018–2024)
- Spelling Films (moved to Paramount Pictures International; currently by AID (All Interactive Distribution))
- Cinergi Productions
- Castle Rock Entertainment (moved to Warner Bros. Home Entertainment)
- 20th Century Fox (moved to Universal for New Zealand distribution in 2011)
- Morgan Creek Entertainment
- Franchise Pictures
- Beacon Pictures
- Intermedia
- MDP Worldwide
- Regency Enterprises
- Rysher Entertainment
- Lakeshore Entertainment
- Initial Entertainment Group
- South Pacific Pictures
- TVNZ (1996–2013) (moved to Jigsaw Entertainment)
- ABC Motion Pictures (1983–1987)
- Lorimar Distribution (1985–1990) (acquired by Warner Communications Inc.)
- PolyGram Filmed Entertainment (1982–1984)
- Capella Films
- Summit Entertainment
- Mandate Pictures
- StudioCanal
