= Jim Keeble =

English writer

Jim Keeble is a novelist, travel-writer and screenwriter from Cambridge, England. He now lives in London with his wife.

== Biography ==
Keeble is an Oxford graduate. For his travel-writing, Keeble won the 1995 "Travel Writer of the Year" award at the Travelex Awards, and his book Independence Day – A voyage around America with a broken heart was one of the New York Times' top six travel books of the year 2000. With Dudi Appleton, Keeble began writing screenplays. The first which was filmed was A Sort Of Homecoming (1994) which was a short based and filmed in Strangford Lough in County Down. This was followed by The Most Fertile Man in Ireland (set in County Donegal in west Ulster), in 1999.

In television, Keeble continued the collaboration and wrote for series such as Inspector George Gently, Silent Witness and co-created the crime drama Wild Bill. Appleton and Keeble adapted Robert van Gulik's 'Judge Dee' novels for a new Chinese-British television series. In 2024, Youku released the series, Judge Dee's Mystery.

As literary influences, Keeble states Anne Tyler, Michael Ondaatje, John Irving, Nick Hornby and Charles M. Schulz.

== Bibliography ==
- 2000: Independence Day - A voyage around America with a broken heart
- 2003: My Fat Brother (US title Men and other Mammals)
- 2005: The A-Z of Us

== Filmography ==
- 1994: A Sort of Homecoming (writer; short film)
- 1999: The Most Fertile Man in Ireland (writer; feature film)
- 2008: Trial & Retribution (wrote 2 episodes)
- 2008-2026: Silent Witness (wrote 22 episodes)
- 2010: Throne (wrote 6 episodes)
- 2015: Inspector George Gently (wrote 1 episode)
- 2019: Wild Bill (creator; wrote 3 episodes)
- 2024: Judge Dee's Mystery (wrote 32 episodes)
- 2026: 12 12 12 (creator; wrote 4 episodes)
