= Matt Thunell =

American television producer

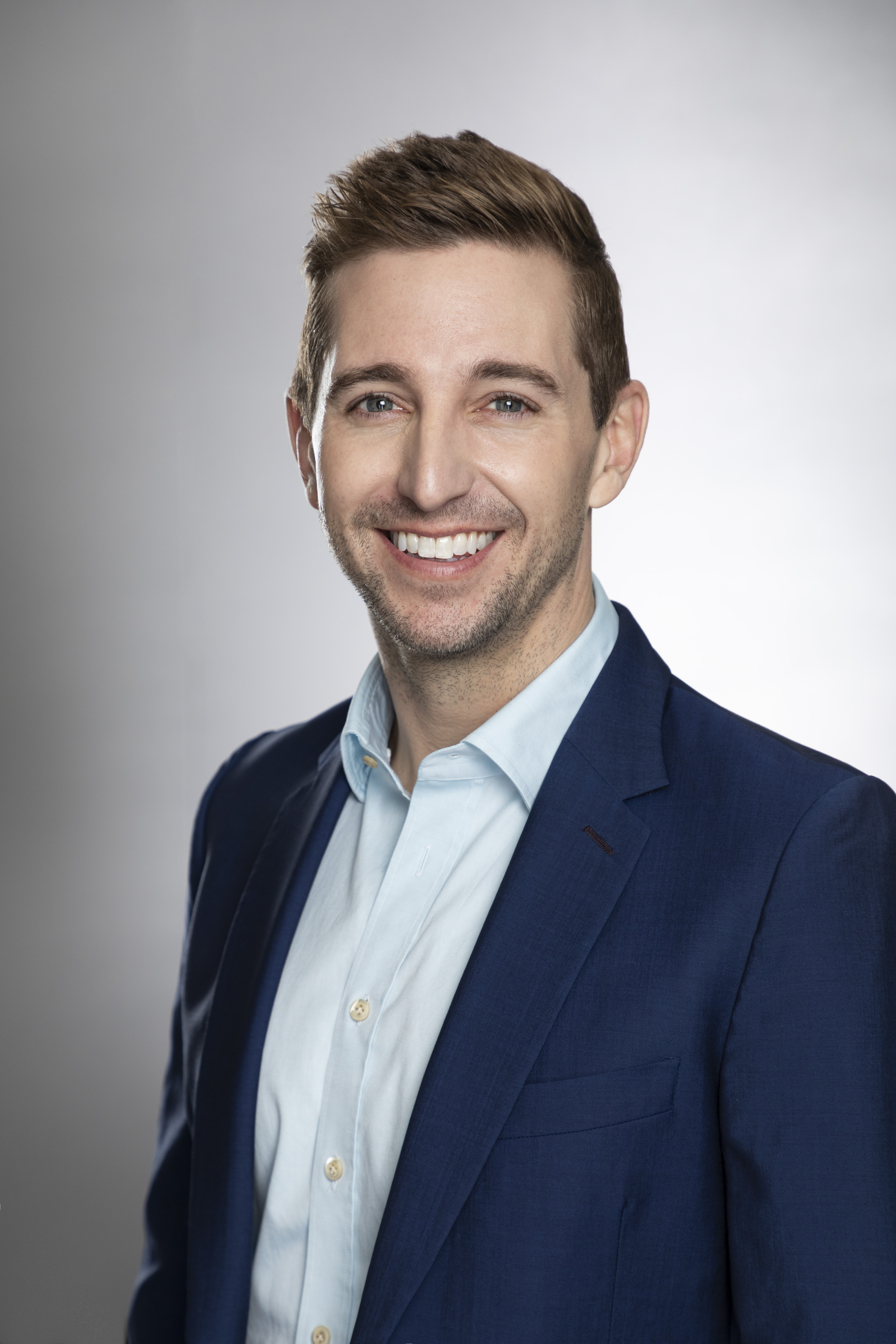
- Born: 1985 (age 40–41)
- Education: Yale University
- Occupations: Television producer; studio executive
- Years active: 2012–present
- Title: President of Paramount Television Studios

Matthew Thunell is an American television producer and studio executive serving as President of Paramount Television Studios since August 2025. He has previously held positions at television networks and streaming services Sony Pictures Television, The CW, Netflix and Skydance Television.

== Early life ==
Thunell is from Columbia, South Carolina and attended Dreher High School.

Thunell attended Yale University and graduated cum laude. At Yale, Thunell was a competitive swimmer and tour manager of The Whiffenpoofs, Yale's a cappella group. He is Jewish.

== Career ==
=== Early years ===
Thunell started his career in investment banking at UBS at the bank's New York City office. Following the 2008 financial crisis, he moved to California to work for The Walt Disney Company, before moving to Sony Pictures Television.

=== The CW Network ===
In 2012, Thunell was hired as director of scripted development at American broadcast network, The CW. There he developed the television series Arrow, The Flash and Jane the Virgin for the network.

=== Netflix ===
In 2015, Thunell joined American streaming service Netflix, where he held various roles. He led the young adult team, working on the series Thirteen Reasons Why and Outer Banks. He then held the role of vice president of overall deals and later was vice president of original series. He and his team were responsible for the television series, miniseries and anthologies Stranger Things, The Queen's Gambit, Black Mirror and House of Cards. The Duffer Brothers credited Thunell as an early supporter of their science fiction horror series, Stranger Things. Thunell helped found Netflix's emerging director program.

=== Skydance Television ===
In 2022, Thunell was appointed president of Skydance Television. In this role he led development and production of all television projects and oversaw the creative, production and business affairs teams. There he oversaw the Amazon Prime Video shows Reacher and Cross and the upcoming show Ride or Die, and the Apple TV series Foundation and the upcoming Neuromancer and 12 12 12.

=== Paramount Skydance Corporation ===
Thunell is of Ashkenazi Jewish descent. In August 2025, Paramount Television Studios was revived, following the Paramount Skydance merger. The revival merged Skydance Television with MTV Entertainment Studios, Nickelodeon live-action television and Awesomeness. That same month, Thunell was named as president of the new entity, where his role was to oversee streaming production and television series. Under Thunell, Paramount Television Studios television shows included Landman, Dexter: Resurrection and Emily in Paris.

Thunell reports to Dana Goldberg, chair of Paramount Television Studios and co-chair of Paramount Pictures.

In 2025, Thunell secured television and streaming deals with filmmakers The Duffer Brothers and a television production deal with actress Issa Rae. In 2026, Thunell entered production deals for Paramount Television Studios with writer Liz Tigelaar; Yellowjackets creators Ashley Lyle and Bart Nickerson; and Jessica Biel's and Michelle Purple's production company, Iron Ocean.

== Filmography ==
Producer

- Stranger Things (2016)
- 13 Reasons Why (2017)
- Jack Ryan (2023)
- Reacher (2023)
- The Big Door Prize (2024)
- Cross (2024)
- FUBAR (2025)
- The Runarounds (2025)
- One Night in Idaho: The College Murders (2025)
- Foundation (2025)
- Neagley (2026)
- 12 12 12 (2026)
- Neuromancer (2027)
