= Thorne (TV series) =

British crime drama television series

- Genre: Crime drama; Police procedural
- Written by: Dudi Appleton; Jim Keeble
- Directed by: Stephen Hopkins; Benjamin Ross
- Starring: David Morrissey; Eddie Marsan; Aidan Gillen; O-T Fagbenle; Lorraine Ashbourne
- Composer: Laurent Eyquem
- Countries of origin: United Kingdom
- Original language: English
- No. of series: 1
- No. of episodes: 6

Production
- Executive producers: Dudi Appleton; Mark Billingham; Stephen Hopkins; Patrick Irwin; Jim Keeble; Huw Kennair-Jones; Paul Morrissey; Daniel Proulx; Lorraine Richard; Justin Thomson
- Producers: Greg Dummett; Jolyon Symonds
- Cinematography: Joel Ransom; Pierre Jodoin
- Editors: John Smith; Gaétan Huot; Paul Knight
- Running time: 60 minutes
- Production company: 87 Films

Original release
- Network: Sky One
- Release: 10 October – 14 November 2010

Thorne is a British crime drama television series, based on the novels of author Mark Billingham, that was first broadcast on Sky One on 10 October 2010. A single six-episode series, starring David Morrissey in the title role of Detective Inspector Tom Thorne, was broadcast at 21:00 on Sundays until 14 November. As well as Morrissey, the series also stars Aidan Gillen, Eddie Marsan, O-T Fagbenle and Lorraine Ashbourne in supporting roles. The series comprises two three-part dramatisations of the first two Thorne novels, Sleepyhead and Scaredycat. Sleepyhead, directed by Stephen Hopkins, previewed in full at the BFI Southbank in London on 4 October 2010, followed by a Q&A session featuring writer Mark Billingham and actors David Morrissey and Eddie Marsan.

Although directly adapted from the novels, there are notable differences in the series, including: Brigstocke's gender has been changed; Dave Holland's ethnicity has been changed; and Phil Hendricks is portrayed as a short, partly tattooed Irishman with a full head of hair, a juxtaposition of the tall, bald, heavily pierced, heavily tattooed Mancunian described in Billingham's novels. In the United States, Encore broadcast all six episodes of the series across two nights. Sleepyhead and Scaredycat aired on 12 and 13 June 2012 respectively. The series is also available as a complete box set from Netflix. All six episodes were released on Region 2 DVD and Blu-ray on 10 January 2011.

== Production ==
Prior to filming, David Morrissey commented on how he became involved with the role: "I was doing a film in New Zealand, on my own, in winter. I really needed a book. I stumbled across a Thorne novel, liked it, and then I looked up Mark online and found a question-and-answer session where he said that if his books ever made it to the screen, he’d like me to play the lead. I thought, that’s a good start". The first two novels adapted for the series were Sleepyhead, in which Thorne has to track down and stop a serial killer who aims to leave his victims alive but unable to communicate because of locked-in syndrome; and Scaredycat, in which two serial killers, Martin Palmer and Stuart Nicklin, begin to work in tandem to pick off their victims.

Billingham later expressed a desire to film all ten Thorne novels. Likewise, Morrissey confirmed in February 2011 that a second series had gone into production. However, in a newsletter issued to members of his mailing list in December 2012, Billingham stated that Morrissey's role in The Walking Dead had suspended plans for any further series. To date, no further series of Thorne have been produced.

== Reception ==
The series primarily faced competition from Downton Abbey, Single Father and a re-run of The Da Vinci Code on its debut broadcast, although held a 1.5% audience share, drawing in 402,000 viewers, according to BARB. Likewise, reviews of the series have been positive, and it holds a score of 74/100 on review aggregation website Metacritic. Tom Sutcliffe of The Independent wrote approvingly of the direction of director Stephen Hopkins, "who keeps using his camera to catch Thorne from incriminating angles, as if he's a perpetrator not a policeman", and the performances of Morrissey and McElhone.

Andrea Mullaney of The Scotsman, praised the efforts made by BSkyB in the production and casting, but added "it's a shame that our best actors can't be used for anything more radical or real." Adam Sweeting of The Arts Desk wrote a more scathing review, commenting; "Despite the hype, it's just another cop show full of corpses, but Morrissey feels authentic as the phlegmatic, low-key Thorne". He also criticised the romantic link between Morrissey and McElhone, writing; "It was like Vinnie Jones getting off with Joanna Lumley".

== Cast ==
- David Morrissey as DI Tom Thorne
- Eddie Marsan as Kevin Tughan
- Aidan Gillen as Phil Hendricks
- O-T Fagbenle as Dave Holland
- Lorraine Ashbourne as Ruth Brigstocke
- Jack Shepherd as Jim Thorne

=== Sleepyhead ===
- Natascha McElhone as Anne Coburn
- Sara Lloyd-Gregory as Alison Willetts
- Aisling Loftus as Rachel Coburn
- Sarah Niles as Maggie Byrne
- Joshua Close as Josh Ramsey
- Brian McCardie as Francis Calvert
- Stephen Campbell Moore as Jeremy Bishop
- Georgia Tennant as Sophie Holland
- Amanda Root as Teresa Maxwell

=== Scaredycat ===
- Sandra Oh as DS Sarah Chen
- Tom Brooke as Martin Palmer
- Joe Absolom as Stuart Nicklin
- Claire Benedict as Maeve Reynolds
- Lolita Chakrabarti as Seema Khera
- Leo Gregory as Sean Bracher
- Javed Khan as DC Dev Khan
- Velibor Topic as Pavel Rasadovic
- Harry Jarvis as Young Stuart Nicklin

== Episodes ==
No.	Title	Directed by	Written by	Original release date	UK viewers (millions)
1	"Sleepyhead—Episode 1"	Stephen Hopkins	Dudi Appleton & Jim Keeble	10 October 2010	0.65
Three women are found murdered, their killer having induced them into having strokes. A fourth victim is still alive, and might be able to identify her assailant, except that she cannot communicate as she has been left with locked-in syndrome. Investigating, DI Tom Thorne concludes that it was the killer's intention to leave his victims incapacitated, not dead.
2	"Sleepyhead—Episode 2"	Stephen Hopkins	Dudi Appleton & Jim Keeble	17 October 2010	0.66
Thorne is forced to conduct his investigation alone when Tughan dismisses his "locked-in" theory. He and Anne Coburn try to help Alison Willetts communicate. A woman who claims to have escaped the killer is attacked.
3	"Sleepyhead—Episode 3"	Stephen Hopkins	Dudi Appleton & Jim Keeble	24 October 2010	0.75
Thorne confronts Phil Hendricks and accuses him of murdering the three girls fifteen years ago.
4	"Scaredycat—Episode 1"	Benjamin Ross	Dudi Appleton & Jim Keeble	31 October 2010	0.72
Two women have been murdered simultaneously near St Pancras station, but in quite different ways. When the connection is made with two other murders, months before but on the same day, DI Thorne realises that two serial killers are at work in a macabre partnership.
5	"Scaredycat—Episode 2"	Benjamin Ross	Dudi Appleton & Jim Keeble	7 November 2010	0.66
One of the killers is caught after a failed attempt on the life of the son of another victim. He confesses to his crimes, but refuses to identify his partner. Thorne decides to free him in an attempt to force the other killer to come forward.
6	"Scaredycat—Episode 3"	Benjamin Ross	Dudi Appleton & Jim Keeble	14 November 2010	0.56
Palmer escapes from police custody and he and Nicklin resume their series of murders. DS Chen, desperate to prove herself, risks everything to catch the pair.
