= Wild Bill (TV series) =

British television series

- Genre: Comedy drama Crime drama Police procedural
- Created by: David Griffiths; Kyle Killen; Dudi Appleton; Jim Keeble
- Directed by: Annie Griffin; John Hardwick; Charles Martin
- Starring: Rob Lowe; Bronwyn James; Rachael Stirling; Anjli Mohindra; Tony Pitts; Anthony Flanagan; Divian Ladwa; Aloreia Spencer; Angela Griffin; Vicki Pepperdine; Steffan Rhodri; Aleksandar Jovanovic
- Composer: Harry Escott
- Country of origin: United Kingdom
- Original language: English
- No. of seasons: 1
- No. of episodes: 6

Production
- Executive producers: Rory Aitken; Dudi Appleton; Tim Carter; David Griffiths; Jim Keeble; Kyle Killen; Rob Lowe; Eleanor Moran; Scott Pennington; Keith Redmon
- Producers: Peter McAleese; Chris Thompson
- Production locations: London; Lincolnshire
- Cinematography: Michael Coulter; Baz Irvine
- Editors: Charlie Fawcett; Mike Jones; Peter Oliver
- Running time: 45 minutes approx.
- Production companies: Shiver; Anonymous Content; 42

Original release
- Network: ITV
- Release: 12 June – 17 July 2019

Wild Bill is a British television drama series which premiered on ITV on 12 June 2019. The series stars executive producer Rob Lowe, and six episodes were commissioned in October 2018.

== Premise ==
Chief Constable Bill Hixon, a widowed former US police chief, moves from Miami to Boston, Lincolnshire, with his fourteen-year-old daughter Kelsey, after being sacked from the American police force for assaulting a boy who had uploaded sexual images of his daughter. Although he makes an immediate impact on his colleagues, none appear too pleased to have an American officer around, aside from eager young trainee detective Muriel Yeardsley, with whom Bill forms an affinity after a slightly rocky initial start.

== Cast ==
- Rob Lowe as Chief Constable Bill Hixon; head of the East Lincolnshire Police Force
- Bronwyn James as DC Muriel Yeardsley; a trainee CID detective toward whom Bill takes a particular shine
- Rachael Stirling as Lady Mary Harborough; a local crown court judge with whom Bill has an affair
- Anjli Mohindra as Deputy Chief Constable Lydia Price; Bill's second in command
- Tony Pitts as the police and crime commissioner Keith Metcalfe; Bill's manager
- Anthony Flanagan as PC Sean Cobley; a disillusioned beat cop determined not to accept Bill's new regime
- Divian Ladwa as PC Troy Drakes; PC Cobley's bumbling beat partner
- Aloreia Spencer as Kelsey Hixon; Bill's teenage daughter
- Angela Griffin as Lisa Cranston; a local journalist assigned to oversee Bill's tenure as Chief Constable
- Vicki Pepperdine as Broadbent; the force's resident pathologist
- Steffan Rhodri as DS Alex Blair; DC Yeardsley's immediate superior
- Aleksandar Jovanovic as Oleg Kraznov; a dangerous Russian businessman attempting to build a criminal empire on Bill's turf

== Production ==
The series stars executive producer Rob Lowe, and six episodes were commissioned in October 2018.

Filming began in November 2018, with Anjli Mohindra, Rachael Stirling and Angela Griffin confirmed to be among the cast. Aloreia Spencer, who plays Hixon's fourteen-year-old daughter Kesley, made her on-screen debut in the series.

== Episodes ==
No.	Title	Directed by	Written by	Original release date	UK viewers (millions) (Note: Viewers across the first 28 days of broadcast on TV, PC/laptop, tablet or smartphone are counted.)
1	"Welcome to Boston"	Charles Martin	Dudi Appleton & Jim Keeble	12 June 2019	5.78
Bill Hixon arrives in Boston to take up the position of Chief Constable with East Lincolnshire police – but his first day is far from routine when the head of a teenage girl who disappeared several years previously is found in the freezer of a local nut job. Bill seizes the chance to take on one of the force's most notorious unsolved cases, and befriends the girl's mother, Angie (Susan Lynch), as the investigation into her death gets underway.
2	"Piano Man"	Charles Martin	Dudi Appleton & Jim Keeble	19 June 2019	4.36
'Piano Man', (Craig Parkinson), an amnesiac arrested after an altercation at a local train station, is implicated in series of unsolved armed robberies committed by an offender known only as the 'Boston Bandit'. Although CID are keen to wrap the case up, Bill suspects that 'Piano Man' may have been framed and sets about discovering the truth. Lydia comes under fire when a personal connection to one of the victims in the case is uncovered.
3	"Dead Men Don't Return Library Books"	John Hardwick	Tom Farrelly	26 June 2019	4.07
When Boston's pensioners find themselves under attack from a seasoned burglar who has seemingly resurfaced after fifteen years away, Bill interviews local librarian Alma Smith (Emma D'Arcy), whose DNA is partial match to the burglar. Alma's father, Jonjo Ryan, disappeared when she was just a baby, but as Bill comes under further scrutiny from the press, he discovers that Alma's connection to the case may not be as innocent as he first suspected.
4	"Bad Blood in the Soil"	John Hardwick	Tom Moran	3 July 2019	N/A
A sparring rivalry between two local farming families is reignited when the body of labourer Will Mowbray is found in a secluded area of woodland known locally as 'Dead Man's Wood'. Bill initially suspects the fiery Audrey Merrick (Lisa Palfrey) of being responsible for Will's murder, but Muriel is convinced that rival farmhand Ray Gilchrist (Con O'Neill) had a part to play. Meanwhile, Kelsey's first day at her new school results in an unexpected friendship.
5	"You're Stupid Enough to Say That to A Copper?"	Annie Griffin	Melissa Bubnic	10 July 2019	3.30
The murder of local farmer found floating in a suitcase in the local river leads Bill to become a shoulder to cry on for the victim's daughter, Charlene (Nichola Burley). Suspicion falls amongst the many immigrant workers found amongst his payroll, many of whom claim to have been living in squalid conditions. However, the situation is complicated when it transpires that the victim's wife, Lubica (Katarina Čas) had recently acquired all of his assets.
6	"Nothing Behind the Curtain"	Annie Griffin	Dudi Appleton & Jim Keeble	17 July 2019	N/A
On his way home from work, Bill finds five charred bodies atop a bonfire on the roadside, close to a local farm. Pathology reveals that all five victims had been shot through the head with a nail, although this was not the cause of death. Raking through cases with a similar MO, Bill uncovers a series of murders committed by Frank McGill (Patrick Bergin), a former hitman who has been in witness protection since 1997, having turned Queen's evidence on his former gangland boss.

== Cancellation ==
On 13 November 2019, ITV announced the series was cancelled after a single series.

== Broadcast ==
On 29 May 2019, CBC Television announced it was picking up the show, then began broadcasting it 9 March 2020.

On 4 August 2020, BritBox North America announced it would release the series for the US market, then began releasing it weekly from 4 August 2020.

== Reception ==
The series received mixed reviews, with Lucy Mangan of The Guardian awarding the series' premiere episode three stars, writing:

There’s a segment in John Mulaney’s 2018 comedy special Kid Gorgeous at Radio City in which the American stand-up attempts to grapple with the phenomenon of Donald Trump’s presidency via a prolonged analogy – delivered in increasingly incredulous tones – of there being "a horse loose in a hospital".[...] Wild Bill is ITV’s new drama and it stars Rob Lowe as the new chief constable of East Lincolnshire police. There’s a horse loose in the hospital.

— Lucy Mangan,

The Independent's two-star review described it as "grim and a bit cheapo", a "howling letdown", and "dreary".

== Home media ==
The series was released on DVD on 29 July 2019.
