= The Most Fertile Man in Ireland =

- Directed by: Dudi Appleton
- Written by: Jim Keeble
- Produced by: David Collins
- Starring: Bronagh Gallagher; Kris Marshall; James Nesbitt
- Cinematography: Ronan Fox
- Edited by: Emer Reynolds
- Music by: James Johnson
- Release date: 15 September 2000 (Toronto)
- Running time: 91 minutes; 96 minutes
- Country: Ireland
- Language: English

The Most Fertile Man in Ireland is a 2000 Irish comedy film directed by Dudi Appleton and starring Bronagh Gallagher, Kris Marshall and James Nesbitt.

== Cast ==
- Kris Marshall as Eamonn Manley
- Kathy Kiera Clarke as Rosie
- Bronagh Gallagher as Millicent
- James Nesbitt as Billy Wilson
- Kenneth Cranham as Father
- Tara Lynne O'Neill as Mary Mallory
- Pauline McLynn as Maeve
- Olivia Nash as Mother
- Marc O'Shea as Raymond
- Alvaro Lucchesi as Frank
- Toyah Willcox as Dr. Johnson

== Release ==
The film premiered at the Toronto International Film Festival on 15 September 2000. It was then released in theaters in the United Kingdom in June 2003.

== Reception ==
Patrick Peters of Empire awarded the film two stars out of five. Jamie Russell of the BBC gave it three stars out of five.
