= Dudi Appleton =

Northern Irish journalist

David Jeremy Nicholas Appleton (born 1969) is a Northern Irish journalist, screenwriter and film director.

== Early life ==
Appleton attended Rockport School in Holywood, County Down, and then Campbell College in Belfast before attending Jesus College, Oxford, where he read English.

Dudi, as he has been known since a child, attended Central Acting School in London. Though he acted in plays and film, he was more attracted to writing, where he became a travel journalist for The Standard, The Guardian and The Daily Telegraph broadsheets.

== Career ==
Working with his Oxford companion Jim Keeble, who had moved into writing books, they began writing film scripts. The first which was filmed was A Sort Of Homecoming (1994) which was a short based and filmed in Strangford Lough in County Down. As they continued to write scripts, Appleton wished to direct a full-length feature. In 1999 they made The Most Fertile Man in Ireland (set in County Donegal in west Ulster), for which he would later win the HBO Comedy award in Colorado for best director, awarded to Appleton by Billy Crystal.

He has written scripts for Disney, Miramax, Warner Brothers and Scott Free and has worked with directors such as Oliver Stone and Sir Ridley Scott developing adaptations and screenplays. In television, Appleton wrote for series such as Inspector George Gently, Silent Witness and co-created and wrote the crime drama Wild Bill for ITV. Appleton has also directed television, for series such as Signora Volpe.

Appleton and Keeble adapted Robert van Gulik’s ‘Judge Dee’ historical mystery novels for a new Chinese-British television series. In 2024, Youku released the series, Judge Dee's Mystery, which also streamed on Netflix.

== Filmography ==
- 1994: A Sort of Homecoming (director; short film)
- 1999: The Most Fertile Man in Ireland (director; feature film)
- 2008: Trial & Retribution (wrote 2 episodes)
- 2008-2026: Silent Witness (wrote 22 episodes)
- 2010: Throne (wrote 6 episodes)
- 2015: Inspector George Gently (wrote 1 episode)
- 2019: Wild Bill (creator; wrote 3 episodes)
- 2024: Judge Dee's Mystery (wrote 32 episodes)
- 2026: 12 12 12 (creator; wrote 4 episodes)
