= Jericho (British TV series) =

- DVD cover
- Genre: Crime; Period drama
- Created by: Stewart Harcourt
- Developed by: Granada Television
- Directed by: Nicholas Renton; Diarmuid Lawrence; Tom Shankland
- Starring: Robert Lindsay; David Troughton; Ciarán McMenamin; Nicholas Jones; Lydia Leonard
- Composer: Dominik Scherrer
- Country of origin: United Kingdom
- Original language: English
- No. of series: 1
- No. of episodes: 4

Production
- Executive producers: Rebecca Eaton; Damien Timmer; Michele Buck
- Producer: Cameron McAllister
- Production locations: State Theatre, Grays, Essex, England, UK
- Running time: 120 minutes (including adverts)
- Production companies: Granada Television; WGBH Boston

Original release
- Network: ITV
- Release: 16 October – 6 November 2005

Related
- Foyle's War; Fabian of the Yard

Jericho is a British period crime drama series, first broadcast as a series of four episodes on ITV from 16 October 2005. The series was written and created by Stewart Harcourt, and starred Robert Lindsay as Detective Inspector Michael Jericho, a Scotland Yard detective who is loved by the public but embarrassed by his status as a hero. Because of his fame, a TV series, based on his career, is in development, paralleling the real-life TV series Fabian of the Yard which fictionalized the career of Scotland Yard detective Robert Fabian. The series is set in London in 1958. The series was seen as an attempt to exploit ITV's success in period crime drama, best exemplified by Foyle's War, and to rival the BBC's staple dramas such as Waking the Dead.

The first episode drew in 5.9 million viewers, but this quickly fell to 4.7 million for the second episode, significantly less than its BBC rival. Critical response to the series was cautious, and a second series was not commissioned. The series was later shown in the United States in 2006 and 2007 under the title Jericho of Scotland Yard as part of the PBS Mystery! series, and was also broadcast by the Australian Broadcasting Corporation in 2008.

== Synopsis ==
Detective Inspector Michael Jericho is the son of an English policeman who returned from World War I a violent and changed man. Young Jericho witnessed his father shot and killed in his own front hall by two gunmen. In his father's right hand was his pocket watch, which Jericho now keeps with him constantly. In the series, Jericho carries on a private feud with a local crime boss, whom Jericho believes, but cannot prove, either brought about his father's death or knew who had him killed; the boss in turn has suborned a thuggish Scotland Yard Inspector named Christie to hound Jericho by planting scandal sheets under his nose about his father being a "corrupt policeman" or by implying Jericho has a less than professional relationship with his downstairs neighbour – a French prostitute. Jericho's mother is still alive, although they are only seen meeting in the cemetery on the anniversary of his father's death.

Jericho served in World War II. Besides his off again-on again relationship with his downstairs neighbour, he is a workaholic who sleeps poorly. He has a faithful secretary, a tough sergeant, a younger DI assistant, and, as comic relief, an informer who is a street fence. The last episode, "The Hollow Men", features in-jokes about the TV industry: a director replaces Jericho with a comic actor, starring as Jericho in a fictionalized series of Jericho's Scotland Yard cases; at a banquet meeting of police widows and orphans, Christie tries to get Jericho as the master of ceremonies after guest speaker Benny Hill has cancelled.

== Cast ==
- Robert Lindsay as DI Michael Jericho
- David Troughton as Sgt Clive Harvey
- Ciarán McMenamin as DC John Caldicott
- Nicholas Jones as AC Graham Cherry
- Kellie Bright as WPC Penny Collins
- Eve Matheson as Rita Harvey
- Lee Ross as Louis Jackson
- Lydia Leonard as Angela
- Aurélie Bargème as Juliette
- Brendan Coyle as Christie

== Episodes ==
Three of the four episode titles are derived from poems by T. S. Eliot. "A Pair of Ragged Claws" is quoted from a book of Eliot poetry owned by the mistress of a murder victim in that episode. In "To Murder and Create", a murder victim has the name "Thomas Stearns Eliot". Both are lines from "The Love Song of J. Alfred Prufrock". "The Hollow Men" is also the title of Eliot's poem from 1925.

No.	Title	Directed by	Written by	Original release date	U.K. viewers (millions)
1	"A Pair of Ragged Claws"	Nicholas Renton	Stewart Harcourt	16 October 2005	6.54
Jericho investigates the brutal murder of a young Jamaican in Notting Hill, and soon identifies it as a racial killing - but his work is interrupted when a wealthy businessman is kidnapped. But all is not as it seems - Sir Nicholas Wellesley has not been staying at his club or visiting his usual haunts.
2	"The Killing of Johnny Swan"	Nicholas Renton	Stewart Harcourt	23 October 2005	5.08
Jericho and his team investigate the double murder of a bride and a renowned runner which takes place in the bridal suite after national hero Johnny Swan gets married. The upcoming race between Swan and a Soviet runner is a national obsession, and the police must determine if international intrigue or a simple domestic triangle is at the heart of the crime.
3	"To Murder and Create"	Diarmuid Lawrence	Stewart Harcourt	30 October 2005	4.99
When a thermonuclear scientist turns up strangled with cheese-wire, lipstick on his cheek, and a sheet of newspaper stuffed into his mouth, Jericho and his team aren't sure if this is a political assassination, or a crime passionnel.
4	"The Hollow Men"	Tom Shankland	Stewart Harcourt	6 November 2005	5.43
Jericho investigates the murders of couples who attended a showing of The Bridge on the River Kwai, while a fog has descended on the city. The press thinks that it's the work of "The Butcher", a murderer who has been on the loose since the 20s.
