= Honeypot =

Honeypot may refer to:

- A vessel (especially one made of pottery) for storing honey

== Biology ==
- Honeypot ant, various ant species and their individual members
- Honeypot, flowering plant Protea cynaroides
- Honeypot dryandra, flowering plant Banksia nivea

== Metaphors evoking the use of honey as bait in a trap ==
- Honey trapping, presenting romantic or sexual opportunity, as bait or as continuing motivation

=== Espionage using sexual/romantic "bait" ===
- Recruitment of spies
- Honeypots in espionage fiction

=== "Sting" operations ===
- Bait car, a vehicle used by law enforcement agencies to capture thieves
- Honeypot (computing), target presented to elicit hacking attempts

== Titled works ==
=== Narrative works ===
- The Honey Pot, a 1967 film starring Rex Harrison and Susan Hayward
- The Honeypot (film), a 1920 British silent romance film
- "Honeypot" (Archer), episode of animated TV series Archer
- "The Honeypot" (Brooklyn Nine-Nine), episode of TV series Brooklyn Nine-Nine

=== Songs ===
- "Honeypot", by Beat Happening on their eponymous album
- "Honeypot", by Rebelution on Peace of Mind album

=== Other ===
- Honeytrap: The Secret Lives of Stephen Ward, 1987 non-fiction book by Anthony Summers and Stephen Dorril

== Places ==
- Honeypot Glen, area in Cheshire, Connecticut
- Honeypot Wood, site west of Dereham in Norfolk

== Other uses ==
- Honeypot, local name for a patch of quicksand in Maine, U.S.
- Honeypot (tourism), particularly popular venue
- Honeypot Productions, theatre company

== See also ==
- Honey (disambiguation)
- Honey bucket (disambiguation)
- Honeytoken – Entries in a database to track stolen data
- WP:HONEYPOT
