= Honeypots in espionage fiction =

Espionage fiction term

In espionage terminology, honeypot and honey trap are terms for an operational practice involving the use of a covert agent (usually female), to create a sexual or romantic relationship to compromise a target. The operator may be a government spy service or organized crime syndicate and the target, or victim, can unwittingly provide intelligence or perform other services for the operator. These situations are a very common plot device in spy fiction and media portrayals of female espionage. Variations include same-sex relationships and complications may involve the covert agent falling in love with the target.

== Examples ==
=== Literature ===
- In the Tom Clancy novel Rainbow Six (1998), Kirk McLean is used as a honeytrap in order to recruit subjects for testing the Shiva virus.
- In the Alex Rider novel Nightshade (2012), it is revealed that MI6 chief of operations Mrs Jones was seduced by a Russian honeypot while she was starting her career: they married and had children together, but he eventually escaped once his cover was blown, later selling their children to the terrorist group/cult Nightshade to be brainwashed into unconventional assassins.
- In the Frederick Forsyth novels The Devil's Alternative and The Fist of God, honeytrap agents are used as plot elements; the former features an apparent KGB mole who is revealed to be a deliberate informer, while the latter features a Mossad mozhno boy being used in Vienna to break into a bank by seducing the manager's spinster secretary.

=== Feature films ===
- In Spione (Spies, 1928), Fritz Lang's silent spy thriller, the diabolical villain deploys two different female honeypots to ensnare his adversaries.
- In Super Troopers, Captain John O'Hagen refers to the honeypot when Foster falls for, and is presumably betrayed by, female officer Ursula Hanson.
- In The Green Berets, Colonel Cai uses his sister-in-law, a top Vietnamese/French fashion model named Lin, as a honeypot to lure a North Vietnamese general commanding Viet Cong forces to a former French colonial mansion so he can be captured by Special Forces personnel.
- In The Interview Dave Skylark accuses CIA Agent Lacey of being a honeypot when she recruits him to assassinate Kim Jong-un.
- North by Northwest has Eva Marie Saint as both the honeypot and a double agent
- In Munich, Avner says: "beware the local honey trap" of a seductive woman at a bar who turns out to be an assassin, killing one of the team. She is later tracked and murdered in retaliation.
- Traffic features a same-sex honeytrap
- In Bad Boys 2, Martin Lawrence's character refers to his sister as a honeypot for the DEA.
- In The Recruit, Bridget Moynahan seduces Colin Farrell in a bar as part of her CIA training. After successfully leading him out of the bar, she utters 'Op completed', and says her operation was to prevent him from completing his.
- In the 1970 film Darling Lili starring Julie Andrews and Rock Hudson, Julie Andrews plays a German spy in World War I using her womanly charms to secure Allied secrets from an American officer, played by Rock Hudson.

=== Television ===
- In Criminal Minds, Emily Prentiss is a honeypot who seduces former IRA terrorist Ian Doyle.
- In Strike Back, a honey pot agent is ordered to sleep with Sgt. John Porter in order to boost his confidence.
- In an episode of Life on Mars, Sam Tyler arrests the henchman of a local Mr. Big, only to be humiliated in a honey trap.
- The M*A*S*H episode "Are you now, Margaret?" from September 24, 1979.
- In Alias, Laura Bristow, the mother of the central character Sydney Bristow was a honeypot.
- In Battlestar Galactica, a copy of Sharon "Boomer" Valerii, pretending to be the real Valerii, staged a rescue of the stranded Helo on occupied Caprica. The rescue mission was an elaborate ruse to get Helo to fall in love with Valerii, but backfired when Valerii also fell in love and betrayed her own people to flee with Helo.
- In Archer, the honeypot is a commonly referred to style of espionage. It is specifically dealt with in the fifth episode of the series, named Honeypot, in which the main character, Archer, is sent on an unorthodox mission required to seduce and have sex with another man in order to recover a video disc.

=== Video games ===
- In the game Star Wars: Knights of the Old Republic, the player character can defend a Republic agent accused of murder. It is revealed that the murder victim was a Sith woman sent to seduce the Republic agent and gain information.
- In Metal Gear Solid 3: Snake Eater, EVA is a honeypot as well as a double agent.
- In Alpha Protocol, player-protagonist Michael Thorton can discover that his allies, handler Mina Tang and photojournalist Scarlet Lake, have fulfilled the role of honeypots in a larger conspiracy he spends the game working to unravel: however, Thorton can still turn either or both of them to his side.

== James Bond novels and films ==
- In the novel Casino Royale and its 2006 film adaptation, Vesper Lynd is a double agent—for SMERSH in the novel, and Quantum in the film. In the film, it is revealed that Vesper Lynd was herself recruited by a male honeypot, and Bond's search for this male honeypot drives Bond's actions throughout much of the film's sequel, Quantum of Solace.
- In From Russia, with Love, SMERSH uses Tatiana Romanova in an attempt to lure James Bond to his death. In the film adaptation, Romanova is instead used by SPECTRE.
- In both Live and Let Die and its film adaptation, Solitaire transfers her allegiance from Mr. Big to Bond, becoming a double agent.
- In GoldenEye, Xenia Onatopp is the archetypal honey-trap assassin who can kill targets with her thighs.

== See also ==
- Honeypot (disambiguation)
- Honeypot (computing)
- Sexpionage
