= Peter Flannery =

English playwright and screenwriter

Peter Flannery (born 12 October 1951) is an English playwright and screenwriter. He was born in Jarrow, Tyne and Wear and educated at the University of Manchester. He is best known for his work while a resident playwright at the Royal Shakespeare Company in the late 1970s and early 1980s. Notable plays during his tenure include: Savage Amusement (1978), Awful Knawful (1978), and Our Friends in the North (1982). Other theatre work has included Singer (1989).

He is perhaps best known to a wider audience for his highly acclaimed television adaptation of Our Friends in the North, produced by the BBC and screened on BBC2 in 1996. The epic nine-part serial, charting the course of the lives of four friends from Newcastle from 1964 to 1995, was voted by the British Film Institute in 2000 as one of the 100 Greatest British Television Programmes of the 20th century. Flannery's other television work has included Blind Justice (1988), a series about the work of radical lawyers. At the 1997 British Academy Television Awards, Flannery was given the honorary Dennis Potter Award for outstanding achievement in television writing.

In January 2007, he scripted an adaptation of Alan Hunter's Inspector Gently novels, entitled George Gently, for BBC One to be broadcast later in the year. Flannery changed the setting of the stories from Suffolk to the North East in the 1960s and created new characters who had not featured in the novels. George Gently is produced by Company Pictures, reuniting Flannery with Our Friends in the North producer Charles Pattinson, who co-runs Company and is an executive producer on the series alongside Flannery. The drama was eventually shown on 8 April 2007. The seventh series – now titled Inspector George Gently – was screened in the spring of 2015, and the eighth and final series comprising just two episodes in 2017.

Flannery has also worked in film, although with less success than in other media. He wrote the screenplays for films such as Funny Bones (1995) and The One and Only (2002).

In 2008, Channel 4 transmitted Flannery's mini-series about the English Civil War, The Devil's Whore, on which he had worked for more than a decade. In 2014, the channel released a four-part continuation, titled New Worlds. This series was set in England and America in the 1680s and was co-written by Martine Brandt. It featured various characters of a new generation, played by Jamie Dornan, Freya Mavor, Joe Dempsie, Eve Best, Jeremy Northam, and Alice Englert.

Flannery's stage adaptation of Nikita Mikhalkov's film Burnt by the Sun opened at the National Theatre, London, in March 2009. The cast included Irish actor Ciarán Hinds as General Kotov, Rory Kinnear as Mitya, and Michelle Dockery as Maroussia.

Flannery lives in Wallingford, Oxfordshire.
