= Honey bucket =

Honey bucket may refer to:

== Sanitation systems ==
Different sorts of toilets, for example:

- Bucket toilet
- Chemical toilet, a toilet which collects human excreta in a container and uses chemicals to minimize odors
- Portable toilet, a movable toilet used in a variety of situations

== Other ==
- A bucket of honey (see beekeeping)
- Honey Bucket (musical group), a band from Portland, Oregon
- "Honey Bucket" (song) – a 1993 song by Melvins
