= Orlaith Rafter =

Actor and playwright

Orlaith Rafter is an actor and playwright. She is known to television viewers as the character Robin McKenna in long-running soap opera Fair City.

She was interviewed for the special A Fair City for Love. She said she is nothing like her screen character in Fair City. Cars do not interest her and neither do material things.

While away from Fair City, she wrote her first play, Mercury Memory. In 2009, she experimented with novel writing but intended to return to the screen.

She married software engineer Mick Quinlan in 2011.

== See also ==
- List of Fair City characters
