= Alan Hunter (author) =

English crime fiction writer

Alan Hunter (25 June 1922 – 26 February 2005) was an English author of crime fiction, writing 46 novels featuring Inspector George Gently.

Initially a farmer, he became an antiquarian bookseller before writing his first novel.

== Life ==
Hunter was born at Hoveton, Norfolk, and went to school across the River Bure in Wroxham. He left school at 14 and worked on his father's farm near Norwich. He enjoyed dinghy sailing on the Norfolk Broads, wrote natural history notes for the local newspaper, and wrote poetry, some of which was published while he was in the Royal Air Force during the Second World War.

He married, in 1944, Adelaide Cubitt, who survived him with their daughter. After the war, he managed the antiquarian books department of Charles Cubitt in Norwich. Four years later, in 1950, he established his own bookshop on Maddermarket in the city.

He retired to Brundall in Norfolk, where he continued his interests in local history, natural history, and sailing.

From 1955 to 1998, he published a George Gently detective novel nearly every year. The majority are set in Norfolk.

== Bibliography ==
- The Norwich Poems (1944)
- The George Gently Series
  - Gently Does It (1955)
  - Gently by the Shore (1956)
  - Gently Down the Stream (1957)
  - Landed Gently (1957)
  - Gently Through the Mill (1958)
  - Gently in the Sun (1959)
  - Gently with the Painters (1960)
  - Gently to the Summit (1961)
  - Gently Go Man (1961)
  - Gently Where the Roads Go (1962)
  - Gently Floating (1963)
  - Gently Sahib (1964)
  - Gently with the Ladies (1965)
  - Gently North-West (1967)
  - Gently Continental (1967)
  - Gently Coloured (1969)
  - Gently with the Innocents (1970)
  - Gently at a Gallop (1971)
  - Vivienne -- Gently Where She Lay (1972)
  - Gently French (1973)
  - Gently in Trees (1974)
  - Gently with Love (1975)
  - Gently Where the Birds Are (1976)
  - Gently Instrumental (1977)
  - Gently to a Sleep (1978)
  - The Honfleur Decision - Gently Under Fire (1980)
  - Gabrielle’s Way - Gently Heartbroken (1981)
  - Fields of Heather - Gently In The Past (1981)
  - Gently Between Tides (1982)
  - Amorous Leander - Gently With Passion (1983)
  - The Unhung Man (1984)
  - “Once a Prostitute” (1984)
  - The Chelsea Ghost (1985)
  - Goodnight, Sweet Prince (1986)
  - Strangling Man (1987)
  - Traitor's End (1988)
  - Gently with the Millions (1989)
  - Gently Scandalous (1990)
  - Gently to a Kill (1991)
  - Gently Tragic (1992)
  - Gently in the Glens (1993)
  - Bomber’s Moon (1994)
  - Jackpot! (1995)
  - The Love of Gods (1997)
  - Over Here (1998)
  - Gently Mistaken (1999)

== Adaptations in other media ==
In 2007, the BBC broadcast an adaptation of Gently Go Man under the title George Gently. Two more stories, 'The Burning Man' (adapted from the book Gently Where the Roads Go) and 'Bomber's Moon' (adapted from the book of the same name), were broadcast by the BBC in July 2008. All three were written by Peter Flannery, who is credited with creating the series for television. The role of George Gently is played by Martin Shaw. A second series (with the title expanded to Inspector George Gently) was broadcast in 2009, a third in 2010, a fourth in 2011, a fifth in 2012, a sixth in 2014, a seventh in 2015, and the eighth and last in 2017. The series differs markedly from the books, being set in Northumberland and Durham rather than in Norfolk, and with different characters (other than the eponymous Gently).
