= Stewart Harcourt =

English screenwriter

- Born: 1968 (age 57–58); Coventry, England
- Education: University of Hull; University of Birmingham
- Occupation: Screenwriter

Stewart Harcourt (born 1968) is an English screenwriter for film and television, whose work includes Jericho (2005), Murder on the Orient Express (2010), Maigret (2016) and several Miss Marple teleplays.

== Early life and education ==
Harcourt is from Coventry. He attended the Coventry Blue Coat Church of England School. He studied drama at the University of Hull and earned an MA in playwriting from the University of Birmingham.

In 1985, while still at secondary school, he won the RSC Young Playwrights competition. In 1988 he was awarded a prize as part of the National Student Drama Festival in Cambridge. In 1994 he was nominated as Best New Playwright at the London Fringe Awards.

== Career ==
His writing for film and television includes:

Year	Production	Role
2000, 2001	Hearts and Bones	Creator, writer
2005	Jericho	Creator, writer
2005	Marple: A Murder is Announced	Writer
2006	Marple: By the Pricking of my Thumbs	Writer
2006	Dracula	Writer
2007	Marple: Ordeal by Innocence	Writer
2009	The Clocks	Writer
2010	Marple: The Blue Geranium	Writer
2010	Murder on the Orient Express	Writer
2011	George Gently	Writer, Series 4, Episode 1
2012	Treasure Island	Writer
2013	Love and Marriage	Creator, writer
2014	Agatha Raisin	Writer, Series 1
2014	Agatha Raisin and the Quiche of Death	Writer
2016	Maigret	Writer
2016	Churchill's Secret	Writer
2023	Dalgliesh	Writer, Series 2 A Certain Justice with Helen Edmundson
2024	A Gentleman in Moscow	Writer
2026	The Physician II	Writer

=== Also ===
In the early 1990s, Harcourt was artistic director at the Man in the Moon Theatre, King's Road, London. In 1994 he became director of the Old Bull Arts Centre, Barnet.

Harcourt has written the following plays:

- Middle England (1990)
- The Good Times Will Come (1994)
- Somogyi's Monologue (1996)

In 2001 he published A practical guide for writers & companies Pub. Independent Theatre Council. In 2010, along with Jeff Dowson, Nic Jeune, Harcourt was part of a BAFTA-led mentoring project helping young people make film in Bristol. Harcourt has been a guest speaker at Liverpool John Moores University screenwriting MA course.
