= Simon Hubbard =

British actor and director

Simon Hubbard is a British actor and director.

== Biography ==
Hubbard was born in Washington, Tyne & Wear, in June 1976. At the age of seven his family moved to the mining village of Shiney Row where he attended Shiney Row primary school, then on to Washington Comprehensive School.

== Career ==
=== Theatre ===
Hubbard directed his first play at the age of sixteen, George Bernard Shaw's The Dark Lady of the Sonnets, staged at the Washington Arts Centre. His other directing credits include:

- The Zoo Story by Edward Albee, at the Crypt Arts Centre, Dublin.
- The Player Queen by WB Yeats - Trinity Players Theatre – Dublin.
- Road by Jim Cartwright – Trinity Players Theatre – Dublin.
- Nasty Neighbours by Debbie Isitt – Trinity Players Theatre – Dublin.
- 5 nights by David Gilna and Simon Hubbard – Trinity Players Theatre – Dublin.

He also directed several plays at the New Theatre in Dublin:

- The Woman who cooked her husband by Debbie Isitt.
- Spoonface Steinberg by Lee Hall
- Shafted by Arnold T Fanning
- The Respectful Prostitute by JP Sartre.

He directed the critically acclaimed female cast version of David Mamet’s Glengarry Glen Ross.

=== Film ===
Hubbard has also directed a number of short films, including: Every second Sunday with Simon Delaney, Craig Conway, Paul Reid, Jane Elizabeth Walsh, Amy Kirwan and Vanessa Fahy, and Jack, with Declan Reynolds, Rian Sheehy Kelly, Catherine Farrell and Hillary O’Neill.

As an actor, he has appeared on television series, most notably as an original cast member with Lee Ingleby and Martin Shaw on BBC One's Inspector George Gently, where he plays 'PC Taylor'.
