= Reel Corporation =

- Type: Subsidiary
- Industry: Motion pictures
- Founded: 1993; 33 years ago
- Headquarters: Melbourne, Australia
- Owner: Village Roadshow
- Parent: Village Roadshow Entertainment Group

Reel Corporation is an independent Australian film distributor and subsidiary of Village Roadshow. The company was established with the aim of distributing a broad range of films, including smaller-scale productions and genre films that typically receive limited releases in cinemas. Over time, the company has specialized in handling films that may not receive extensive studio support but still hold significant potential in niche markets.

Reel Corporation's joint venture with Roadshow Entertainment resulted in the creation of Reel DVD, which focuses on re-packaging and re-distributing films for a budget-conscious market.

== History ==
Reel Corporation was founded in 1993 as a subsidiary of Village Roadshow to manage the distribution of a diverse set of films across various genres. The company initially focused on distributing films that did not fall under the typical blockbuster category, allowing it to release smaller productions and independent films.

Throughout the years, Reel Corporation expanded its portfolio to include films in niche genres, targeting specific audiences and international markets. The company was particularly successful in distributing horror films and genre titles that lacked the support of major studios. Some notable titles in Reel's portfolio include Teaching Mrs. Tingle, Bride of Chucky, and The Blair Witch Project, all of which were distributed internationally.

While Village Roadshow continued to focus on major releases from major studios like Warner Bros. and New Line Cinema, Reel Corporation handled films that were expected to have more modest box office returns but were still valuable in niche markets. This positioning allowed the company to cater to underserved audiences and expand the diversity of films available in Australia.

== Revival ==
Starting in February 2007, Village Roadshow allocated many of its smaller or underperforming titles to Reel DVD, a subdivision of Reel Corporation. The focus was on repackaging and re-distributing films at discounted prices to the home entertainment market. These included films that had not achieved significant sales during their original theatrical runs or earlier DVD releases.

Films such as Jason X, The Art of War, and House of the Dead were among the titles repackaged for the Reel DVD imprint. These films, despite not being huge box office successes, found a second life through discounted DVD sales. The titles were resubmitted to the Office of Film and Literature Classification for review, which allowed them to receive new Classification logos and simpler Classification Advice, helping ensure they met local regulatory standards.

Today, Reel Corporation continues to distribute films for home video, focusing on direct-to-DVD releases and smaller-scale productions. Its catalog includes a mix of re-released classics, new films in niche genres, and even some cult favorites that have developed a strong following despite limited theatrical exposure.

== Reel Corporation's Impact on the Australian Film Industry ==
Reel Corporation has played a crucial role in expanding the diversity of films available to Australian audiences, especially in the home video and direct-to-DVD markets. The company has provided a platform for films that would otherwise not have received significant attention in the Australian market, allowing audiences to access international titles and independent films that didn't have the support of major distribution companies.

In particular, the company's focus on genre films and niche markets allowed Australian viewers to experience a broader range of films than they might otherwise have encountered. Through its work with *Reel DVD*, the company has contributed to the preservation of cult classics and the dissemination of genre titles that have become cult favorites over time.

== See also ==
- List of film production companies
- List of television production companies
- Village Roadshow Pictures
- Australian film industry
