= David Morley (writer) =

British writer and radio producer (born 1962)

David Morley (born March 1962) is a British writer and radio producer.

Morley wrote a biography of UK politician George Galloway, Gorgeous George: The Life and Adventures of George Galloway (2007). The book's foreword was written by broadcaster Clive Anderson. The Daily Telegraph pulled a favorable review just before publication due to advice from its lawyers, who considered it too risky as they had previously lost a libel case to Galloway.

Morley is a former producer of BBC Radio 2's Clive Anderson's Chat Room and Gold Sony Award winning The Real Alex Ferguson, BBC Radio Five Live, also presented by Clive Anderson.

In 2007, he produced the radio play The McKinnon Extradition, broadcast on BBC Radio 4. The play was directed by Pete Atkin and told the story of Gary McKinnon's arrest and initial fight against extradition to the US for hacking into the Pentagon's computer system. It starred Kris Marshall and Raquel Cassidy.

Morley wrote and produced the drama The Death Of Tom Inglis about the case of Frances Inglis, a British woman who was convicted of murdering her son, Tom. Tom had suffered a major brain injury after falling from the back of a moving ambulance. It was broadcast on BBC Radio 4 on 20 May 2011. The play starred Lesley Manville, Phil Daniels and William Gaminara. It was directed by Dirk Maggs. It was a Perfectly Normal Ltd production.

In September 2012, BBC Radio 4 broadcast Morley's drama A Cold Supper Behind Harrods, which starred David Jason, Anton Lesser, Stephanie Cole, and Sophie Roberts. It was directed by Philip Franks and produced by Richard Clemmow. When three former Special Operations Executive agents are reunited in 1997 their meeting forces them to look at their own conduct during World War Two. The story was inspired by real events. Anton Lesser played code maker Leo Marks and Stephanie Cole played Vera Atkins. The play was streamed live from the Oxford Playhouse in June 2021, with the original cast and director.

In March 2013, BBC Radio 4 broadcast Morley's drama The Iraq Dossier, which starred Richard E Grant, Peter Firth, Anton Lesser, David Caves, with a voice over by Lindsay Duncan. It recounted the story of how British Ministry of Defence Intelligence expert Brian Jones had tried to warn that his government's September Dossier on Iraq's Weapons of Mass Destruction was inaccurate. Morley's script alleged that in 2002 Tony Blair had invited the Russian security services into the Cabinet Offices of Downing Street to be shown classified intelligence material. The drama was produced by Richard Clemmow and directed by Dirk Maggs.

In March 2014, Morley was co-producer with Dirk Maggs of the radio comedy The Hitchhiker's Guide To The Galaxy, Live, by Douglas Adams. It was broadcast on BBC Radio 4 and starred many of the original cast of the show, including Simon Jones, Geoff McGivern, Sue Sheridan and Mark Wing-Davey. It was directed by Dirk Maggs and featured John Lloyd as the Voice of the Book. Morley's documentary about the creation of The Hitchhiker's Guide to the Galaxy was broadcast on BBC Radio 4 in March 2018, with John Lloyd as presenter.

In December 2014, Morley produced the radio drama Ebola, by Mike Walker. It told the story of the discovery of the Ebola virus in 1976 and was broadcast on BBC Radio 4. It was narrated by the co-discoverer of the virus Peter Piot. It was directed by Dirk Maggs.

In July 2015, Morley wrote and produced Heading To Paradise. It reconstructed events in the lives of some of the victims of Malaysia Airlines flight MH17. The Radio Times described it as "upsetting". The cast included Joe Caffrey, Tracy Wiles, Richard Goulding, Daniel Weyman, and Philip Franks and featured recorded contributions from Hans De Borst, father of Elsemiek De Borst, who died in the crash. Moira Petty of The Stage wrote "When intimations of mortality or utterances of endearment come amid the maelstrom of normality, they hit like a thunderclap".

In November 2016, Morley wrote Michael & Boris: The Two Brexiteers. The drama reconstructed how Boris Johnson and Michael Gove fell out after their Brexit victory. It revealed for the first time why Boris Johnson failed to persuade Andrea Leadsom to join his campaign for the leadership of the Conservative Party. The cast included Alistair McGowan as Boris Johnson, Luke Kempner as Michael Gove, Liza Sadovy as Sarah Vine, and Philip Franks as Ben Wallace MP.

In January 2018, British impressionist Jon Culshaw took on a rare serious role when he played David Bowie in a Morley drama for the BBC World Service.

BBC Radio 4 broadcast The Trials Of CB King in September 2018. The dramas told episodes from the life of US civil rights lawyer Chevene Bowers King. King was the uncle of British former Member of Parliament Oona King. Later the same month Morley's We're Backing Britain, which dramatised the 1968 I'm Backing Britain campaign, was also broadcast on BBC Radio 4. In December 2019, BBC Radio 4 broadcast Massachusetts Avenue, a political espionage mystery in which the main character, Louise, is the First Secretary at the British Embassy in Washington.

British anti-slavery charity Stop The Traffik worked with Morley on his 2019 series "I'm A Slave".

BBC Radio 4 broadcast Smoking Guns in April 2022. The drama revealed how US climate scientist Ben Santer had been attacked by the fossil fuel industry. It starred Shaun Evans.

BBC Radio 4 broadcast Churchill's Bust in June 2025. It starred Daniel Weyman, Jon Culshaw and Tom Mothersdale. Shortlisted for Best Comedy at the BBC Radio Drama Awards

Morley's satire "Elon Musk: Lost In Space" ran at Space Surgeons’ Hall in August 2025

BBC Radio 4 broadcast The Book Club in March 2026. It starred Veronica Roberts, Phillips Franks and Wilf Scolding.

== Other radio drama productions ==
- A Question Of Royalty by Andy Lynch, directed by Dirk Maggs and starring Johnny Vegas, Ricky Tomlinson, Nicola Stephenson and Catherine McCormack.
- Badfellas by Andy Lynch, directed by Dirk Maggs and starring Johnny Vegas, Ricky Tomlinson, and Nicola Stephenson.
- My Mad Grandad by Mike Stott, directed by Dirk Maggs and starring Alison Steadman, Matthew Kelly, and Bernard Hill.
- A Soldier And A Maker by Iain Burnside, directed by Philip Franks and starring Stephanie Cole, and Jemma Redgrave. BBC Radio 3.
- By A Young Officer by Michael Eaton, directed by Dirk Maggs and starring Douglas Booth. BBC Radio 4.
- A Patriot For Me by John Osborne, adapted by Philip Osment and directed by Philip Franks and starring Richard Goulding, Peter Egan, Amanda Root, Michael Pennington. BBC Radio 3.
- Death And Taxis by Sean Grundy, adapted from The Andy Warhol Diaries, and directed by Dirk Maggs. It starred Scott Capurro as Andy Warhol and featured Jon Culshaw, Ronni Ancona, Kerry Shale. BBC Radio 4.
- Vive La Republique by Mike Walker. It starred Ronald Pickup as Charles De Gaulle and featured Barbara Flynn, Daniel Weyman, Philip Jackson, Rory Fleck-Byrne. BBC Radio 4.
- Puckoon an adaptation of the novel by Spike Milligan by Ian Billings. It starred Ed Byrne and Pauline McLynn and featured Barry Cryer as the narrator. It also starred Spike's daughter Jane Milligan, Kate Harbour Wilf Scolding and David Shaw-Parker. It was directed by Dirk Maggs BBC Radio 4.
- Starship Titanic an adaptation of the novel by Terry Jones by Ian Billings. It starred Simon Jones and Michael Palin. It was directed by Dirk Maggs BBC Radio 4.
- Morley directed Red Lines by Sir Craig Oliver and Sir Anthony Seldon. How Prime Minister David Cameron and Barack Obama failed to enforce the "red line" against chemical weapons use by Syria's President Assad, who was aided by Russia's Vladimir Putin. It starred Toby Stephens, Jon Culshaw, Wilf Scolding and Nicholas Boulton. It was produced by Richard Clemmow and Perfectly Normal Productions for BBC Radio 4.
- The Talented Mr Shakespeare written and directed by Wilf Scolding. It starred Mark Gatiss and Tom Mothersdale. BBC Radio 4. Shortlisted for Best Performance: Ensemble at The Speakies (British Audio Awards)

== Other radio productions ==
- Julia Dear Boy, Welcome To Westminster presented by Julia Langdon and featuring interviews with Jack Straw, Kenneth Clarke, Betty Boothroyd and Shirley Williams. BBC Radio 4, 28 February 2015.
- The War Game Files presented by Michael Apted revealed how the BBC had secretly collaborated with Harold Wilson's government to ban The War Game, one of its own films. It featured British government files and confidential BBC internal correspondence. Contributors included Christopher Bland, Michael Tracey, Duncan Campbell and Bruce Kent. BBC Radio 4, 6 June 2015.
- I Work For The Government And Let's Leave It At That presented by Julia Langdon. How women have been recruited into the British secret services over the decades, and featuring interviews with ex head of MI5 Eliza Manningham-Buller, Annie Machon, and MP Fiona Mactaggart. BBC Radio 4, 4 July 2016.
- Don't Panic! It's The Douglas Adams Papers presented by John Lloyd. How Douglas Adams created The Hitchhiker's Guide To The Galaxy. BBC Radio 4, March 2018.
