= Richard E. Grant =

English actor (born 1957)

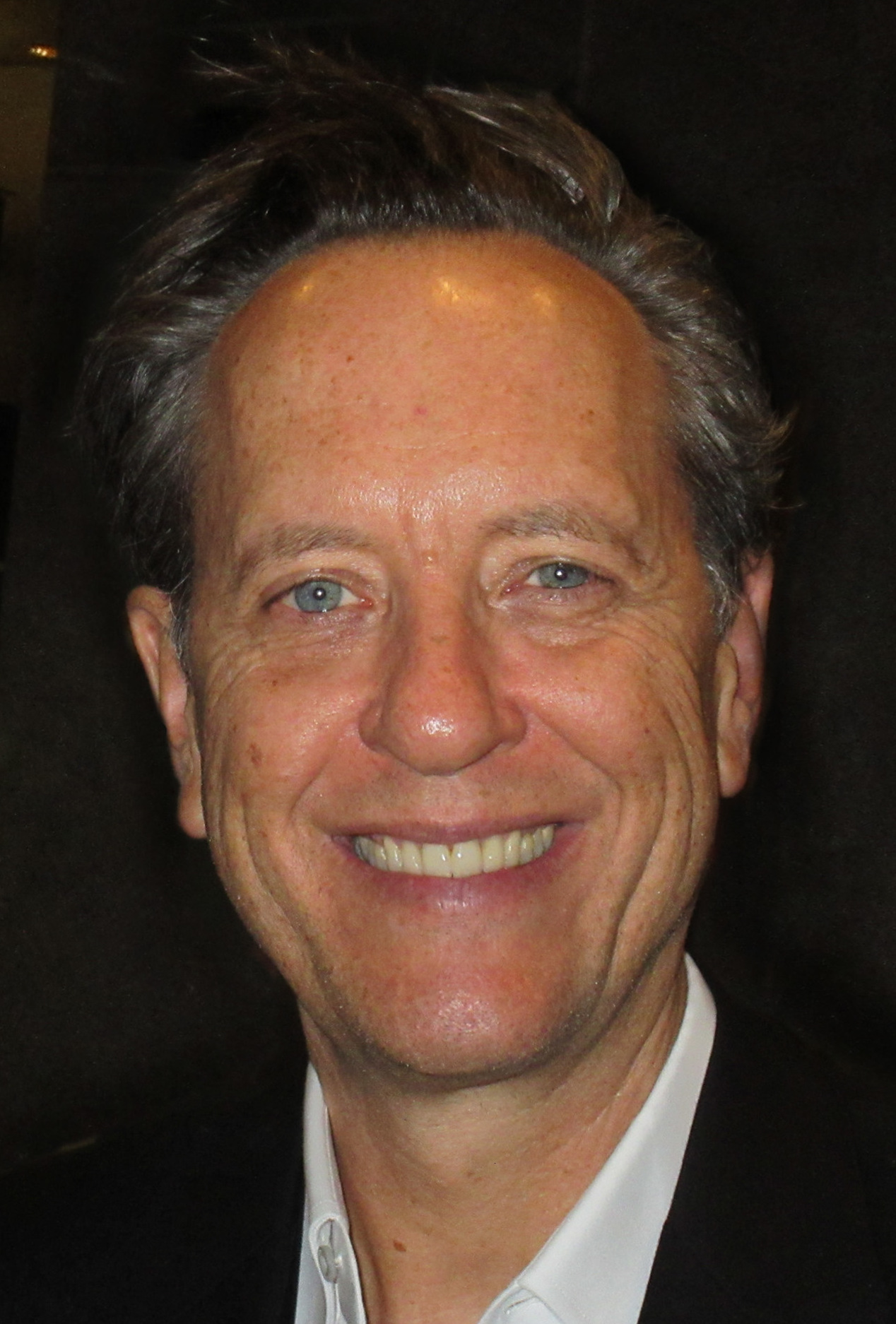
- Grant in 2018
- Born: Richard Grant Esterhuysen; 5 May 1957 (age 69); Mbabane, Swaziland
- Other name: Richard Grant
- Citizenship: Eswatini; United Kingdom
- Education: University of Cape Town
- Occupations: Actor, presenter, perfumer
- Years active: 1980–present
- Spouse: Joan Washington (m. 1986; died 2021)
- Children: 1
- Awards: Full list
- Website: www.richard-e-grant.com

Richard E. Grant (born Richard Grant Esterhuysen; 5 May 1957) is a Swazi and English actor and presenter. He made his film debut as Withnail in the comedy Withnail and I (1987). Grant received critical acclaim for his role as Jack Hock in Marielle Heller's drama film Can You Ever Forgive Me? (2018), winning various awards including the Independent Spirit Award for Best Supporting Male. He also received Academy Award, Actor Award, BAFTA Award, Critics' Choice Movie Award, and Golden Globe Award nominations for Best Supporting Actor.

Grant is also known for his roles in the feature films How to Get Ahead in Advertising (1989), Warlock (1989), Henry & June (1990), Hudson Hawk (1991), Bram Stoker's Dracula (1992), The Age of Innocence (1993), Jack and Sarah (1995), The Portrait of a Lady (1996), A Christmas Carol (1999) The Little Vampire (2000), Gosford Park (2001), Penelope (2006), The Iron Lady (2011), Jackie (2016), Star Wars: The Rise of Skywalker (2019), and Saltburn (2023). He is also known for his roles in television, including Doctor Who (1999, 2003, 2012–13, 2024), The Scarlet Pimpernel (1999–2000), Frasier (2004), Dig (2015), Game of Thrones (2016), Hang Ups (2018), A Series of Unfortunate Events (2019), and Suspect (2022).

== Early life and education ==
Grant was born as Richard Grant Esterhuysen on 5 May 1957 in Mbabane, Protectorate of Swaziland (now Eswatini). He is the elder child of Henrik Esterhuysen and Leonne Esterhuysen. Henrik Esterhuysen was head of education for the British government administration in the British protectorate of Swaziland. Grant's father was an Afrikaner while his mother was of German descent. He has a younger brother, Stuart, an accountant in Johannesburg.

As a boy, he attended St Mark's School, a local government school in Mbabane. Grant attended secondary school at Waterford Kamhlaba United World College of Southern Africa, an independent school near Mbabane. In May 1976, he started at the University of Cape Town to study English and drama.

In 1982, a year after his father's death, he moved to Britain. At that time, he adopted his stage name (truncating his Afrikaans surname to a single letter) and registered with Equity.

== Career ==
Grant was a member of the Space Theatre Company in Cape Town before moving to London in 1982. He later stated, "I grew up in Swaziland when it was mired in a 1960s sensibility. The kind of English spoken where I grew up was a period English sound and when I came to England people said, 'how strange'. Charles Sturridge, who directed Brideshead Revisited for TV, said, 'you speak English like someone from the 1950s.'"

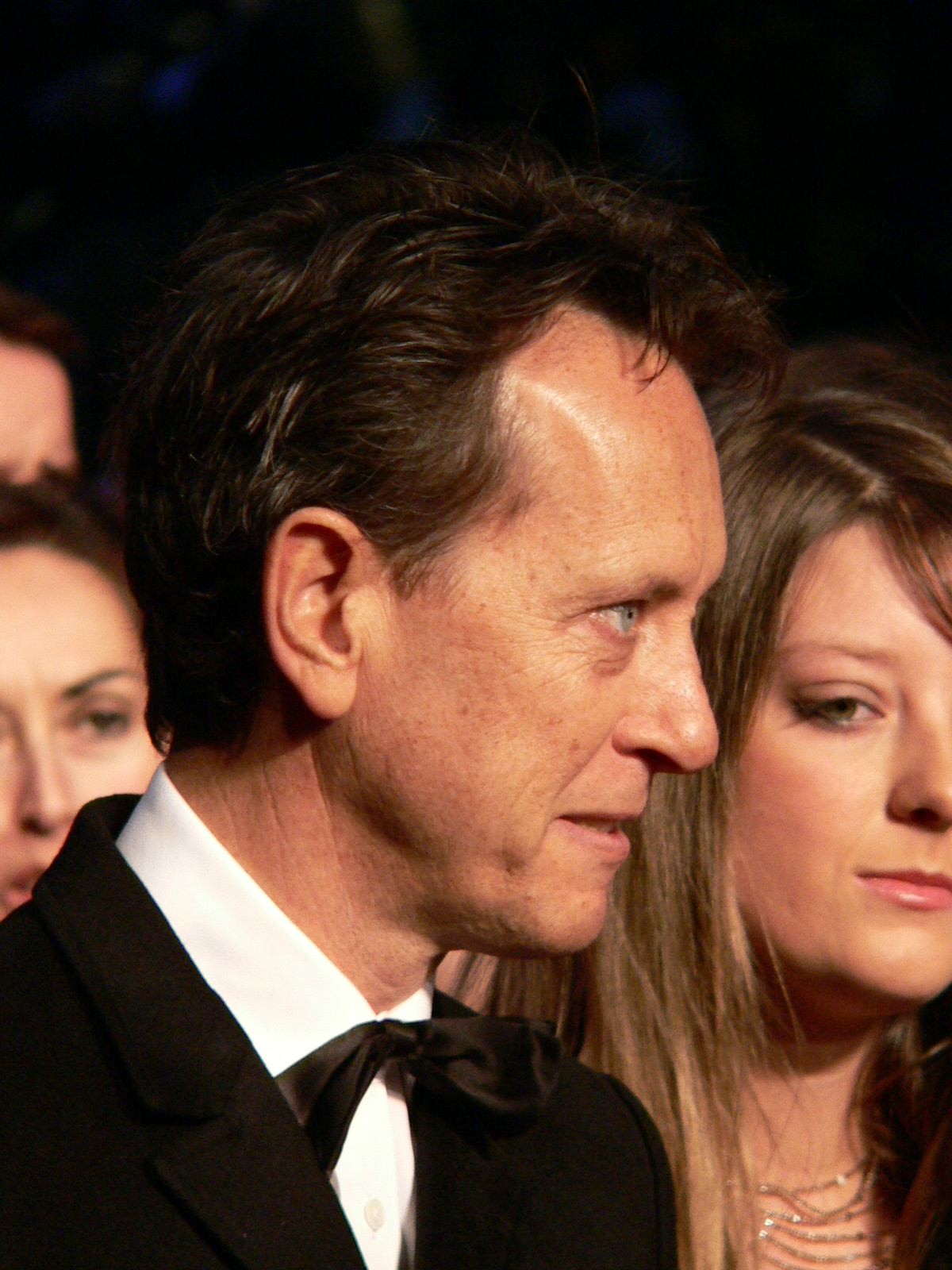
Grant at the 2007 BAFTA Awards

Grant's first film role was the perpetually inebriated title character in the cult classic Withnail and I (1987). Following this, he started appearing in Hollywood films, taking on a range of projects from blockbuster studio movies to small independent projects. Since then, Grant has had supporting roles in the films Henry & June, L.A. Story, The Player, Bram Stoker's Dracula, The Age of Innocence, The Portrait of a Lady, Spice World, Gosford Park, Bright Young Things, and Penelope.

While filming L.A. Story with Steve Martin, the pair communicated by fax. Martin wrote: "I kept these faxes, which grew to a stack more than 2 inches thick, because they entertained me, and because I thought they were valuable aesthetic chunks from a screeching mind, a stream-of-consciousness faucet spewing sentences – sometimes a mile long – none of it rewritten, and bearing just the right amount of acid and alkaline."

In 1995, Grant starred as the titular character in Peter Capaldi's short film Franz Kafka's It's a Wonderful Life. The film won the 1995 Academy Award for Best Live Action Short Film. In 1996, he portrayed Sir Andrew Aguecheek in Trevor Nunn's Twelfth Night. He released a single and accompanying video of "To Be Or Not To Be" with Orpheus in 1997.

Grant has twice portrayed the Doctor from Doctor Who, both outside the main continuity. In the comedy sketch Doctor Who and the Curse of Fatal Death, he portrayed a version of the Tenth Doctor, referred to as the "Quite Handsome Doctor". He also voiced a version of the Ninth Doctor for the BBC original animated webcast Scream of the Shalka. The latter had intended to be the official Ninth Doctor prior to the revival of the TV series. His version of the Doctor also appeared as a projection in "Rogue" (2024), during a sequence in which the faces of the Fifteenth Doctor's previous incarnations were shown floating around his head. He made his first official Doctor Who appearance in the 2012 Christmas special, titled "The Snowmen", in which he plays the villain, Walter Simeon. During the episode, Simeon is erased from his body and it is taken over by the Great Intelligence, voiced by Ian McKellen in the episode until the takeover. Grant reprised the role in "The Bells of Saint John" and in the Series 7 finale, "The Name of the Doctor".

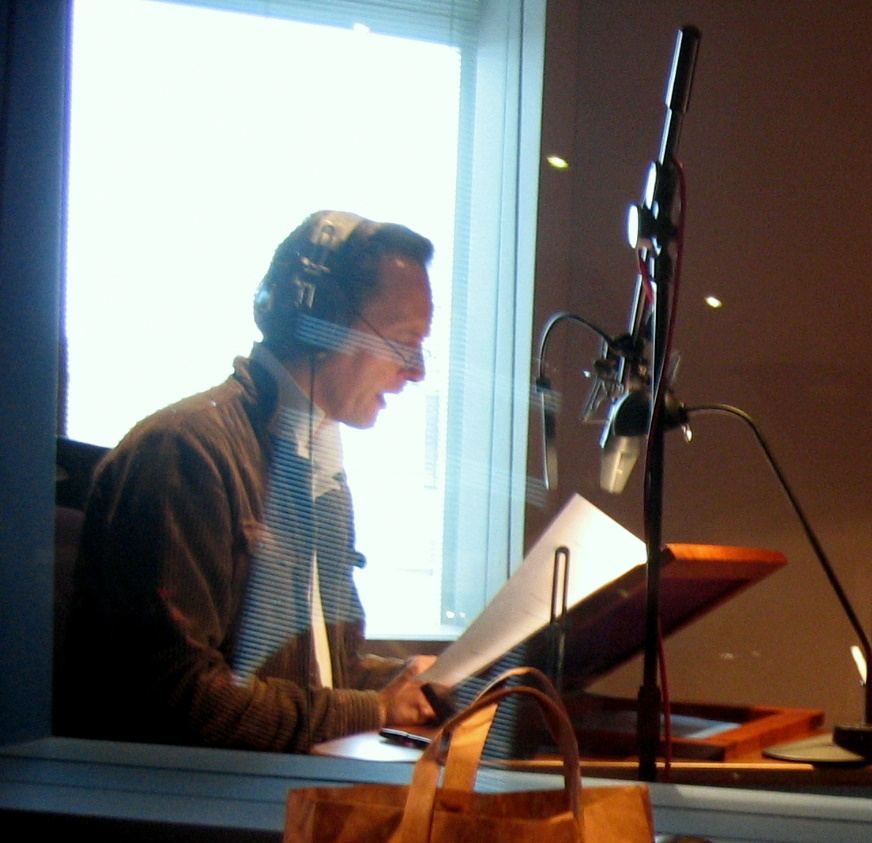
Grant as The Voice for 2+2+2 at Heavy Entertainment, London.

Grant appeared as "The Voice" in 2+2+2 at American Nights at the King's Head Theatre, from 3 to 29 July 2007, and in 2008 co-starred in the London-based comedy Filth and Wisdom. Grant presented the 2008 Laurence Olivier Awards. In 2008, he made his musical theatre debut with Opera Australia, playing the role of Henry Higgins in My Fair Lady at the Theatre Royal, Sydney, a role he reprised in 2017 at the Lyric Opera of Chicago. In 2009, Grant played Alain Reille in Yasmina Reza's one-act play God of Carnage at the Theatre Royal, Bath, and subsequently at Cheltenham, Canterbury, Richmond, Brighton, and Milton Keynes.

In 2010 he starred in short film The Man Who Married Himself, which won Best Comedy at LA International Shorts Festival and Rhode Island Film Festival. Later that year, he made an appearance in a music video, when short-lived Bristol band The Chemists hired him to appear in their video for "This City"; the band split the same year. This appearance followed Grant's involvement with the band the previous year, in which he spoke the lyrics to "This City" to background music as part of the intro and outro tracks on their only album, Theories of Dr Lovelock.

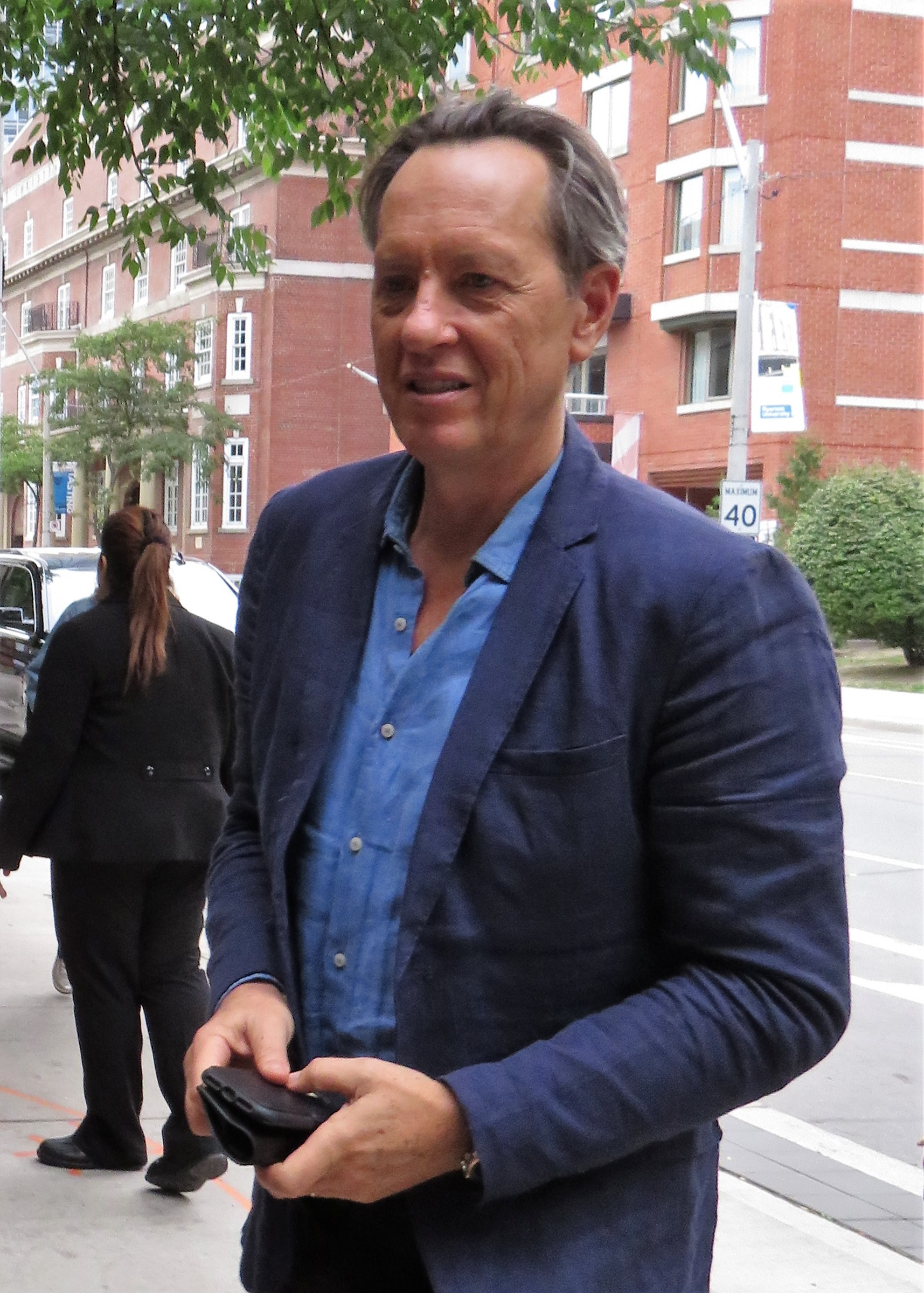
Grant at the premiere of Can You Ever Forgive Me? in 2018

In March 2013, Grant starred as intelligence analyst Brian Jones in David Morley's radio drama The Iraq Dossier with Peter Firth, Anton Lesser, David Caves, and Lindsay Duncan. It recounted the story of how British Ministry of Defence Intelligence expert Jones had tried to warn that his government's September Dossier on Iraq's Weapons of Mass Destruction was inaccurate. In 2014, Grant was cast on the HBO series Girls after series creator Lena Dunham saw him in Spice World.

In 2015, Grant gave a reading at VE Day 70: A Party to Remember in Horse Guards Parade, London. In 2016 he joined the HBO series Game of Thrones in Season 6 as Izembaro. In 2017, he appeared as the villainous corporate scientist Zander Rice in Logan.

Grant's critically lauded performance as Jack Hock in Can You Ever Forgive Me? (2018) earned him Academy Award, BAFTA, Golden Globe, and Screen Actors Guild Award nominations. The part also won Grant a New York Film Critics Circle Award and several other critics awards.

In 2019, Grant appeared in Star Wars: The Rise of Skywalker. Grant played Classic Loki, an older variant of Loki, in the 2021 Disney+ / Marvel Cinematic Universe series Loki. Grant portrayed Sir Walter Elliot in Carrie Cracknell's 2022 adaptation of Jane Austen's Persuasion, which premiered on Netflix. In 2023 he appeared in Emerald Fennell's psychological thriller Saltburn opposite Barry Keoghan, Jacob Elordi, and Rosamund Pike.

Grant appeared on the second series of The Celebrity Traitors in October 2026.

=== Wah-Wah ===
Grant wrote and directed the 2005 film Wah-Wah, loosely based on his childhood. A screenwriter recommended he write a screenplay after reading Grant's memoirs of the filming of Withnail and I. The film took him over seven years to complete and starred Nicholas Hoult in the lead role, with Gabriel Byrne, Miranda Richardson, Julie Walters, and Emily Watson. Grant kept a diary, later published as a book (The Wah-Wah Diaries). The book received positive reviews from critics, many of whom were impressed by the honesty of the tale, especially in regard to his difficult relationship with the "inexperienced" producer Marie-Castille Mention-Schaar.

Grant stated in subsequent interviews that she was a "control freak out of control", and he would "never see her again as long as [he] live[s]". In a BBC interview, he again mentioned his "disastrous" relationship with Mention-Schaar. He related that he had received only five emails from her in the last two months of pre-production, and that she rarely turned up on the set at all. She failed to obtain clearance firstly for song rights and secondly to film in Swaziland. For the last infraction, Grant was eventually forced to meet with the King of Swaziland to seek clemency. During an interview with an Australian chat show, he mentioned that Wah-Wah was not released in France, and as a result, his producer did not make money out of it.

== Personal life ==
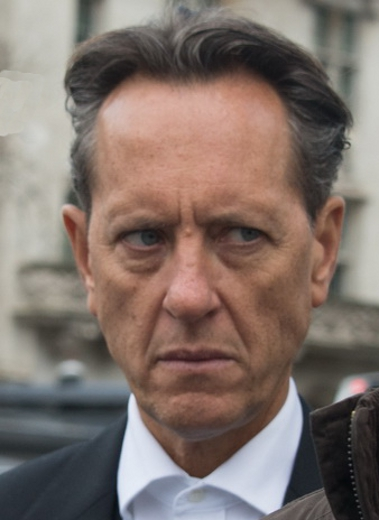
Grant at the Nelson Mandela memorial, Westminster Abbey, 2014

Grant married voice coach Joan Washington in 1986; they had one daughter. After being diagnosed with stage IV lung cancer, Washington died on 2 September 2021.

Grant abstains from drinking alcohol since he has an alcohol intolerance. After casting him as the alcoholic Withnail, director Bruce Robinson made Grant drink a bottle of champagne and half a bottle of vodka during the course of a night so he could experience drunkenness.

Grant is a fan of Barbra Streisand and has done a Streisand tour of New York, visiting her early home, her high school, and the Village Vanguard, among other places.

Grant is a dual citizen of Eswatini and the United Kingdom. His father was fluent in Swazi, the national language of the country. He used to wear a watch on each wrist, one given to him by his dying father, and one set to Swaziland time.

In 2008, Grant told The Times that he is an atheist. In April 2014, Grant launched his new unisex perfume, JACK, exclusively at Liberty of Regent Street, London. Grant runs the perfume business in collaboration with his daughter.

In 2022, Grant released a memoir, A Pocketful of Happiness, mostly written in the last year of his wife's life.

== Filmography ==
Key
†	Denotes films that have not yet been released

=== Film ===
Richard E. Grant' film credits
Year	Title	Role	Notes
1987	Withnail and I	Withnail	
1987	Hidden City	Brewster	
1989	How to Get Ahead in Advertising	Denis Dimbleby Bagley	
1989	Warlock	Giles Redferne	
1990	Mountains of the Moon	Larry Oliphant	
1990	Killing Dad	Ali Berg	
1990	Henry & June	Hugo Guiler	
1991	L.A. Story	Roland Mackey	
1991	Hudson Hawk	Darwin Mayflower	
1992	The Player	Tom Oakley	
1992	Bram Stoker's Dracula	Dr. Jack Seward	
1993	The Age of Innocence	Larry Lefferts	
1993	Franz Kafka's It's a Wonderful Life	Franz Kafka	Short subject
1994	Prêt-à-Porter	Cort Romney	
1995	Jack and Sarah	Jack	
1996	The Cold Light of Day	Victor Marek	
1996	The Portrait of a Lady	Lord Warburton	
1996	Twelfth Night	Sir Andrew Aguecheek	
1997	The Serpent's Kiss	James Fitzmaurice	
1997	Keep the Aspidistra Flying	Gordon Comstock	
1997	Food of Love	Alex Salmon	
1997	Spice World	Clifford	
1999	The Match	Gorgeous Gus	
1999	The Miracle Maker	John the Baptist	Voice
2000	The Little Vampire	Frederick Sackville-Bagg	
2001	Hildegarde	Wolf	
2001	Gosford Park	George	
2003	Monsieur N.	Hudson Lowe	
2003	Bright Young Things	Father Rothschild	
2004	Tooth	Jarvis Jarvis	
2004	The Story of an African Farm	Bonaparte Blenkins	
2005	Wah-Wah	N/A	Writer and director
2005	Corpse Bride	Lord Barkis Bittern	Voice
2005	Colour Me Kubrick	Jasper	
2006	Garfield: A Tail of Two Kitties	Preston	Voice
2006	Penelope	Franklin Wilhern	
2007	Always Crashing in the Same Car	James Booth	
2008	Filth and Wisdom	Professor Flynn	
2008	The Garden of Eden	Colonel Philip Boyle	
2009	Cuckoo	Professor Julius Greengrass	
2009	Love Hurts	Ben Bingham	
2010	Jackboots on Whitehall	Campbell Babbitt	Voice
2010	1st Night	Adam Drummond	
2010	The Nutcracker in 3D	Father	
2010	The Man Who Married Himself	Oliver	
2011	The Last Fashion Show	Federico Marinoni	
2011	Foster	Mr Potts	
2011	Horrid Henry: The Movie	Vic Van Wrinkle	
2011	How to Stop Being a Loser	Ian	
2011	The Iron Lady	Michael Heseltine	
2012	Adventures in Zambezia	Cecil	Voice
2012	Kath & Kimderella	Alain	
2013	About Time	Lawyer in Play	Uncredited cameo
2013	Khumba	Bradley	Voice
2013	Dom Hemingway	Dickie Black	
2014	Queen and Country	Major Cross	
2016	Jackie	William Walton	
2016	Their Finest	Roger Swain	
2017	Logan	Zander Rice	
2017	The Hitman's Bodyguard	Mr. Seifert	
2018	Can You Ever Forgive Me?	Jack Hock	
2018	The Nutcracker and the Four Realms	Shiver	
2019	Palm Beach	Billy	
2019	Star Wars: The Rise of Skywalker	Allegiant General Pryde	
2020	Robin Robin	Magpie	Voice; Short subject
2021	Earwig and the Witch	The Mandrake	Voice; English dub
2021	The Spine of Night	The Guardian	Voice
2021	Hitman's Wife's Bodyguard	Mr. Seifert	
2021	Everybody's Talking About Jamie	Hugo Battersby/Loco Chanelle	
2022	Persuasion	Sir Walter Elliot	
2023	The Lesson	J.M. Sinclair	
2023	Saltburn	Sir James Catton	
2024	Argylle	Fowler	Cameo
2025	Death of a Unicorn	Odell Leopold	
2025	The Thursday Murder Club	Bobby Tanner	
2025	100 Nights of Hero	Birdman	
2025	Nuremberg	David Maxwell Fyfe	
2026	Wicker	The Doctor	
2026	Ladies First	Pigeon Man	
2026	Savage House	Sir Chauncey Savage	
2026	Confessions II	Himself	Short film
2026	Up Against It	TBA	
2026	Wildwood	Owl Rex	Voice
2026	Merry Christmas Aubrey Flint	Mr. Hopkins	
TBA	The Queen of Fashion †	Evelyn Delves Broughton	Post-production

=== Television ===
Richard E. Grant' television credits
Year	Title	Role	Notes
1983	Sweet Sixteen	Anton	Episode: "Episode Six"
1985–1989	Screen Two	Moonee Livingstone/David Dunhill	2 episodes
1988	Codename: Kyril	Sculby	4 episodes
1988	Diebe in der Nacht	Joseph	Television film
1993	Great Performances: Suddenly Last Summer	George Holly	Television special
1993	The Legends of Treasure Island	Long John Silver	Voice; 8 episodes
1994	Absolutely Fabulous	Justin	Episode: "Hospital"
1994	Hard Times	James Harthouse	3 episodes
1996	Karaoke	Nick Balmer	4 episodes
1996	Cold Lazarus	Nick Balmer	2 episodes
1997	A Royal Scandal	George IV	Television film
1997–1998	Captain Star	Captain Jim Star	Voice; 14 episodes
1998	St. Ives	Major Farquhar Chevening	Television film
1999	The Curse of Fatal Death	The Conceited Doctor	Television special
1999	Let Them Eat Cake	Monsieur Vigée-Lebrun	Episode: "The Portrait"
1999	Trial & Retribution III	Stephen Warrington	2 episodes
1999	A Christmas Carol	Bob Cratchit	Television film
1999–2000	The Scarlet Pimpernel	Sir Percy Blakeney / The Scarlet Pimpernel	Television film
2002	Sherlock: Case of Evil	Mycroft Holmes	Television film
2002	The Hound of the Baskervilles	Jack Stapleton	Television film
2003	Posh Nosh	Simon Marchmont	8 episodes
2003	Doctor Who: Scream of the Shalka	Shalka Doctor	Voice; 6 episodes
2004	Frasier	Stephen Moon	Episode: "Goodnight, Seattle"
2004	90 Days in Hollywood	Narrator	Voice; Documentary
2004	The Story of Bohemian Rhapsody	Narrator	Voice; Documentary
2005	Home Farm Twins	Paul Baker	Unknown episodes
2006	That'll Teach 'Em: Boys Versus Girls	Narrator	Voice; 5 episodes
2006	Above and Beyond	Don Bennett	2 episodes
2007	Agatha Christie's Marple	Raymond West	Episode: "Nemesis"
2007	Dalziel and Pascoe	Lee Knight	Episode: "Demons on Our Shoulders"
2007	Roald Dahl's Revolting Rule Book	Himself	Television special
2008	Mumbai Calling	Benedict T. Harlow	Episode: "Good Sellers"
2009	Freezing	Richard	Episode #1.1
2010	Would I Lie to You?	Himself	Episode #4.1
2011	The Crimson Petal and the White	Dr Curlew	4 episodes
2011	Rab C. Nesbitt	Chingford Steel	Episode: "Broke"
2011	Rev.	Marcus	Episode #2.5
2012	Playhouse Presents	Stephen / Tony	Episode: "The Other Woman"
2012	The Fear	Seb Whiting	3 episodes
2012	The History of Safari with Richard E. Grant	Himself (host)	Television documentary
2012–2013	Doctor Who	Dr Walter Simeon / The Great Intelligence	3 episodes (series 7)
2012–2014	Richard E. Grant's Hotel Secrets	Himself (host)	14 episodes
2013	The Riviera: A History in Pictures	Himself (host)	2 episodes
2014	Girls	Jasper	4 episodes
2014	Downton Abbey	Simon Bricker	4 episodes
2014	Psychobitches	Matthew Hopkins	Episode #2.6
2015	Dig	Ian Margrove	9 episodes
2015	Wellington: The Iron Duke Unmasked	Wellington	Television documentary
2015	Jekyll and Hyde	Sir Roger Bulstrode	9 episodes
2016	Game of Thrones	Izembaro	3 episodes
2016	The Last Dragonslayer	Dragon	Voice; Television film
2018	Hang Ups	Leonard Conrad	5 episodes
2019	A Series of Unfortunate Events	The Man with a Beard but No Hair	3 episodes
2019–2022	Tuca & Bertie	Holland	Voice; 9 episodes
2020	Dispatches from Elsewhere	Octavio Coleman	10 episodes
2021	Agatha and Poirot: Partners in Crime	Himself (host)	Television documentary
2021	Loki	Classic Loki	2 episodes
2021	Write Around the World	Himself (host)	3 episodes
2021	Blankety Blank	Himself/panellist	Episode: "Christmas Special"
2021–2022	Moley	The Gardener	Voice; 8 episodes
2021–2024	The Outlaws	The Earl	4 episodes
2022	Suspect	Harry	8 episodes
2024	RuPaul's Drag Race: UK vs. the World	Himself (guest judge)	1 episode (series 2)
2024	Doctor Who	The Doctor	Episode: "Rogue" (series 14); uncredited cameo
2024	The Franchise	Peter Fairchild	8 episodes
2024	The Simpsons	Julian	Voice; Episode: "Desperately Seeking Lisa"
2024	Nautilus	White Rajah	2 episodes
2025	Too Much	Jonno Ratigan	6 episodes
2026	The Other Bennet Sister	Mr. Bennet	Main role
2026	Richard E. Grant's Very Modern Odyssey	Himself (presenter)	Four-part series
2026	The Celebrity Traitors	Himself (contestant)	Series 2

=== Video games ===
Richard E. Grant' video game credits
Year	Title	Role	Notes
2020	Sackboy: A Big Adventure	Vex	Voice

=== Other ===
Richard E. Grant' other credits
Year	Title	Role	Notes
2007	George's Marvellous Medicine	Narrator	Audiobook
2007	The Pillars of the Earth	Narrator	Audiobook
2007	World Without End	Narrator	Audiobook
2008	My Fair Lady	Henry Higgins	Theatre Royal, Sydney
2010	"This City"	Human cyborg	The Chemists music video
2011	Conqueror	Narrator	Audiobook
2013	Fuck: An Irreverent History of the F-Word	Narrator	Audiobook
2013	The Murder at the Vicarage: A Miss Marple Mystery	Narrator	Audiobook
2017	My Fair Lady	Henry Higgins	Lyric Opera of Chicago
2019	Tigeropolis	Narrator	Audiobook
2023	The Wombles	Narrator	Audiobook (abridged version)
2026	Hay Fever	David Bliss	Wyndham's Theatre

=== Tours ===
- An Evening with Richard E Grant (2022) Australia
- An Evening with Richard E Grant (2023) UK

== Bibliography ==
- With Nails: The Film Diaries of Richard E. Grant. 1996. ISBN 0-87951-828-6 (hardcover). ISBN 0-87951-935-5 (paperback).
- By Design: A Hollywood Novel. Picador, 1999. ISBN 0-330-36829-X (10). ISBN 978-0-330-36829-2 (13).
- The Wah-Wah Diaries: The Making of a Film. 2006. ISBN 0-330-44196-5 (hardcover).
- A Pocketful of Happiness: A Memoir. Simon & Schuster, 2022 ISBN 978-1398519473 (hardback)

== See also ==
- List of British actors
- List of Academy Award winners and nominees from Great Britain
- List of atheists in film, radio, television and theatre
