= List of awards and nominations received by Richard E. Grant =

Richard E. Grant awards and nominations
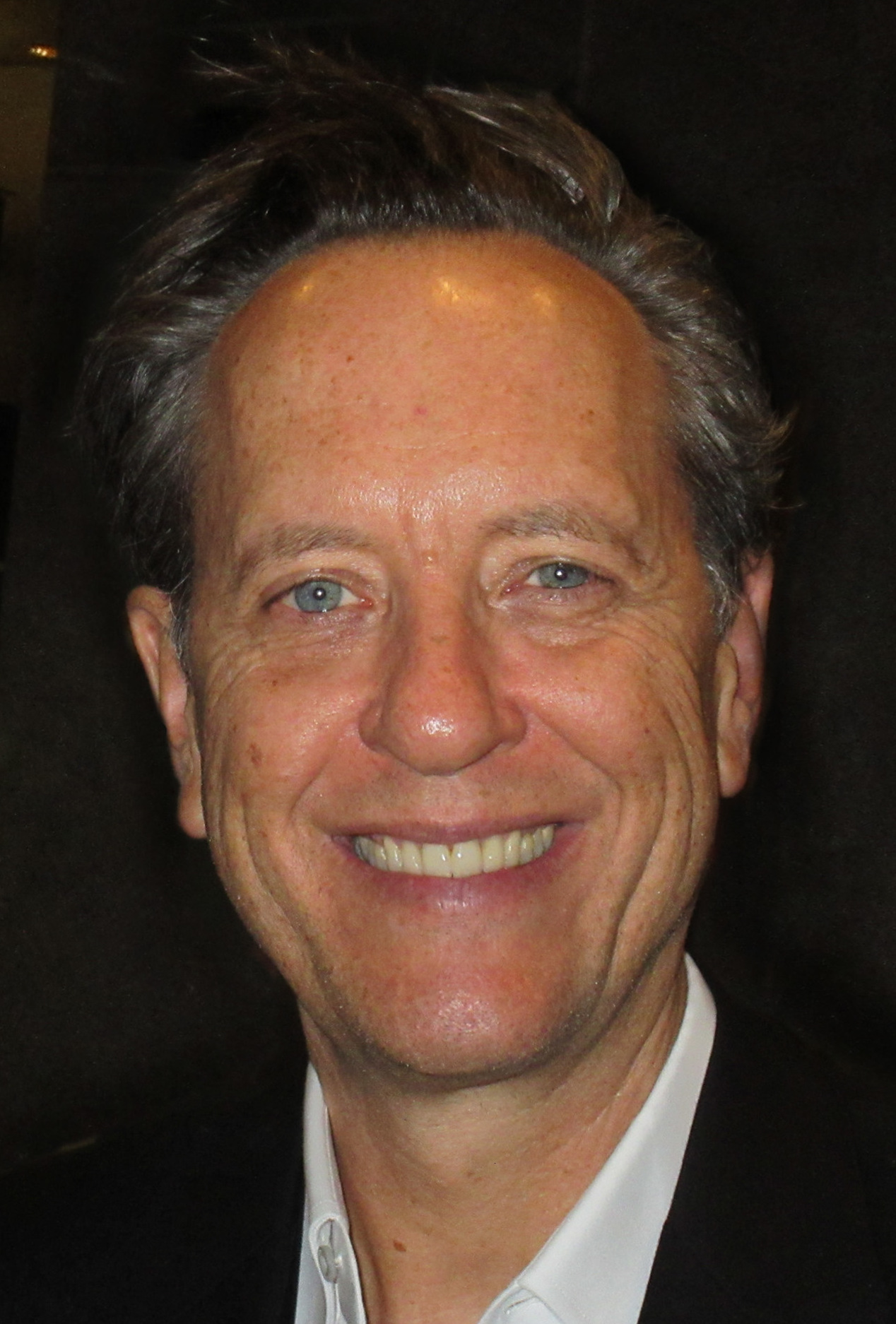
- Grant in 2018
Awards and nominations
Award	Wins	Nominations
Golden Globe	0	1
Academy Awards	0	1
BAFTA Awards	0	1
Screen Actors Guild Awards	1	2

This is a list of awards and nominations received by Swazi-English actor Richard E. Grant.

== Major associations ==
=== Academy Awards ===
Year	Category	Nominated work	Result	Ref.
2019	Best Supporting Actor	Can You Ever Forgive Me?	Nominated	

=== British Academy Film Awards ===
Year	Category	Nominated work	Result	Ref.
2019	Best Actor in a Supporting Role	Can You Ever Forgive Me?	Nominated	

=== Golden Globe Awards ===
Year	Category	Nominated work	Result	Ref.
2019	Best Supporting Actor – Motion Picture	Can You Ever Forgive Me?	Nominated	

=== Screen Actors Guild Awards ===
Year	Category	Nominated work	Result	Ref.
2002	Outstanding Performance by a Cast in a Motion Picture	Gosford Park	Won	
2019	Outstanding Performance by a Male Actor in a Supporting Role	Can You Ever Forgive Me?	Nominated	

== Other awards and nominations ==
=== AARP Movies for Grownups Awards ===
Year	Category	Nominated work	Result	Ref.
2019	Best Supporting Actor	Can You Ever Forgive Me?	Won	

=== Alliance of Women Film Journalists ===
Year	Category	Nominated work	Result	Ref.
2019	Best Supporting Actor	Can You Ever Forgive Me?	Won	

=== Austin Film Critics Association ===
Year	Category	Nominated work	Result	Ref.
2019	Best Supporting Actor	Can You Ever Forgive Me?	Won	

=== Boston Society of Film Critics ===
Year	Category	Nominated work	Result	Ref.
2018	Best Supporting Actor	Can You Ever Forgive Me?	Won	

=== Boston Online Film Critics ===
Year	Category	Nominated work	Result	Ref.
2018	Best Supporting Actor	Can You Ever Forgive Me?	Won	

=== Chicago Film Critics Association ===
Year	Category	Nominated work	Result	Ref.
2018	Best Supporting Actor	Can You Ever Forgive Me?	Won	

=== Columbus Film Critics Association ===
Year	Category	Nominated work	Result	Ref.
2018	Best Supporting Actor	Can You Ever Forgive Me?	Won	

=== Critics' Choice Movie Awards ===
Year	Category	Nominated work	Result	Ref.
2002	Best Acting Ensemble	Gosford Park	Won	
2019	Best Supporting Actor	Can You Ever Forgive Me?	Nominated	

=== Dallas–Fort Worth Film Critics Association ===
Year	Category	Nominated work	Result	Ref.
2018	Best Supporting Actor	Can You Ever Forgive Me?	Nominated	

=== Denver Film Critics Society ===
Year	Category	Nominated work	Result	Ref.
2018	Best Supporting Actor	Can You Ever Forgive Me?	Nominated	

=== Detroit Film Critics Society ===
Year	Category	Nominated work	Result	Ref.
2018	Best Supporting Actor	Can You Ever Forgive Me?	Nominated	

=== Dorian Awards ===
Year	Category	Nominated work	Result	Ref.
2018	Film Performance of the Year – Supporting Actor	Can You Ever Forgive Me?	Won	

=== Florida Film Critics Circle ===
Year	Category	Nominated work	Result	Ref.
2002	Best Cast	Gosford Park	Won	
2018	Best Supporting Actor	Can You Ever Forgive Me?	Runner-up	

=== Georgia Film Critics Association ===
Year	Category	Nominated work	Result	Ref.
2018	Best Supporting Actor	Can You Ever Forgive Me?	Nominated	

=== Golden Raspberry Awards ===
Year	Category	Nominated work	Result	Ref.
1992	Worst Supporting Actor	Hudson Hawk	Nominated	

=== Gotham Independent Film Awards ===
Year	Category	Nominated work	Result	Ref.
2018	Best Actor	Can You Ever Forgive Me?	Nominated	

=== Greater Western New York Film Critics ===
Year	Category	Nominated work	Result	Ref.
2018	Best Supporting Actor	Can You Ever Forgive Me?	Nominated	

=== Hawaii Film Critics Society ===
Year	Category	Nominated work	Result	Ref.
2018	Best Supporting Actor	Can You Ever Forgive Me?	Nominated	

=== Houston Film Critics Society ===
Year	Category	Nominated work	Result	Ref.
2018	Best Supporting Actor	Can You Ever Forgive Me?	Nominated	

=== Independent Spirit Awards ===
Year	Category	Nominated work	Result	Ref.
2019	Best Supporting Male	Can You Ever Forgive Me?	Won	

=== Kansas City Film Critics Circle ===
Year	Category	Nominated work	Result	Ref.
2018	Best Supporting Actor	Can You Ever Forgive Me?	Won	

=== London Film Critics' Circle ===
Year	Category	Nominated work	Result	Ref.
2019	Supporting Actor of the Year	Can You Ever Forgive Me?	Won	
2019	British Actor of the Year	Can You Ever Forgive Me?	Nominated	

=== Los Angeles Online Film Critics Society ===
Year	Category	Nominated work	Result	Ref.
2018	Best Supporting Actor	Can You Ever Forgive Me?	Nominated	

=== Music City Film Critics Association ===
Year	Category	Nominated work	Result	Ref.
2019	Best Supporting Actor	Can You Ever Forgive Me?	Nominated	

=== National Board of Review ===
Year	Category	Nominated work	Result	Ref.
1994	Best Acting by an Ensemble	Prêt-à-Porter	Won	

=== National Society of Film Critics ===
Year	Category	Nominated work	Result	Ref.
2019	Best Supporting Actor	Can You Ever Forgive Me?	Runner-up	

=== Nevada Film Critics Society ===
Year	Category	Nominated work	Result	Ref.
2018	Best Supporting Actor	Can You Ever Forgive Me?	Won	

=== New York Film Critics Circle ===
Year	Category	Nominated work	Result	Ref.
2018	Best Supporting Actor	Can You Ever Forgive Me?	Won	

=== New York Film Critics Online ===
Year	Category	Nominated work	Result	Ref.
2018	Best Supporting Actor	Can You Ever Forgive Me?	Won	

=== North Carolina Film Critics Association ===
Year	Category	Nominated work	Result	Ref.
2018	Best Supporting Actor	Can You Ever Forgive Me?	Nominated	

=== Online Film Critics Society ===
Year	Category	Nominated work	Result	Ref.
2001	Best Ensemble	Gosford Park	Won	
2018	Best Supporting Actor	Can You Ever Forgive Me?	Nominated	

=== Online Association of Female Film Critics ===
Year	Category	Nominated work	Result	Ref.
2018	Best Supporting Actor	Can You Ever Forgive Me?	Won	

=== Philadelphia Film Critics Circle ===
Year	Category	Nominated work	Result	Ref.
2018	Best Supporting Actor	Can You Ever Forgive Me?	Won	

=== Phoenix Critics Circle ===
Year	Category	Nominated work	Result	Ref.
2018	Best Supporting Actor	Can You Ever Forgive Me?	Won	

=== Phoenix Film Critics Society ===
Year	Category	Nominated work	Result	Ref.
2001	Best Cast	Gosford Park	Nominated	

=== San Diego Film Critics Society ===
Year	Category	Nominated work	Result	Ref.
2018	Best Supporting Actor	Can You Ever Forgive Me?	Won	

=== San Francisco Film Critics Circle ===
Year	Category	Nominated work	Result	Ref.
2018	Best Supporting Actor	Can You Ever Forgive Me?	Nominated	

=== Satellite Awards ===
Year	Category	Nominated work	Result	Ref.
2002	Achievement Award – Ensemble Cast	Gosford Park	Won	
2019	Best Supporting Actor – Motion Picture	Can You Ever Forgive Me?	Won	

=== Seattle Film Critics Society ===
Year	Category	Nominated work	Result	Ref.
2018	Best Supporting Actor	Can You Ever Forgive Me?	Won	

=== Southeastern Film Critics Association ===
Year	Category	Nominated work	Result	Ref.
2018	Best Supporting Actor	Can You Ever Forgive Me?	Won	

=== St. Louis Gateway Film Critics Association ===
Year	Category	Nominated work	Result	Ref.
2018	Best Supporting Actor	Can You Ever Forgive Me?	Won	

=== Vancouver Film Critics Circle ===
Year	Category	Nominated work	Result	Ref.
2018	Best Supporting Actor	Can You Ever Forgive Me?	Won	

=== Washington D.C. Area Film Critics Association ===
Year	Category	Nominated work	Result	Ref.
2018	Best Supporting Actor	Can You Ever Forgive Me?	Nominated	
