= Philip Franks =

English actor and director

Philip Acford Franks
- Born: 2 February 1956 (age 70); London, England
- Occupations: Actor, director

Philip Franks (born 2 February 1956) is an English actor and director, known to the public chiefly for his roles in English television series, such as The Darling Buds of May and Heartbeat.

== Early life ==
Franks was born on 2 February 1956 in London and is the only child of Patricia and Robert Franks. His father was a squadron leader pilot in the Royal Air Force. Franks maintains that he first fell in love with theatre as a six-yea old, when his parents took him along to see a production of The Tempest. The following year, his parents were going to a production of Hamlet and Franks insisted on going with them; at the age of seven, he was hooked for life. He was educated at Oxford University.

== Career ==
Franks is best known for his role as the tax inspector Cedric "Charley" Charlton in the English comedy drama The Darling Buds of May, and also as Sgt. Raymond Craddock in Heartbeat. He has also been a guest star in Absolutely Fabulous, Pie in the Sky, Midsomer Murders, Foyle's War, Bleak House, Martin Chuzzlewit, The Buddha of Suburbia, The Green Man and To Serve Them All My Days. For the role of his character in Martin Chuzzlewit (Tom Pinch), Franks shaved off all of the hair on his head leaving wispy strands at the sides. When he was recognized in the street by fans they asked if he had done it for religious reasons.

He also made regular appearances alongside Susie Dent in Dictionary Corner on the game show Countdown (having applied to be a contestant on the show before becoming better known) until 2006. From December 2012 Franks played The Narrator in the 40th anniversary UK touring production of Richard O'Brien's Rocky Horror Show.

Franks is also a member of the Royal Shakespeare Company. In addition, he has directed many plays including "Kafka's Dick" and "The Kiss of the Spiderwoman" (Nottingham Playhouse); "The Cocktail Party" (Edinburgh Festival); "Rebecca" (Royal Lyceum, Edinburgh); "Hamlet" (Greenwich and tour); "Macbeth" (Sheffield Crucible) and "The Duchess of Malfi" (West Yorkshire Playhouse, Greenwich and West End); "Private Lives" and "The Heiress" (Royal National Theatre); "The White Devil" (Lyric Theatre, Hammersmith); "Nicholas Nickleby" (Chichester Festival Theatre); and "The Tempest" (Liverpool Playhouse).

He has also directed many BBC Radio dramas including "A Patriot For Me" by John Osborne starring Richard Goulding, Peter Egan, Amanda Root, Michael Pennington. BBC Radio 3.

Franks also directed "A Cold Supper Behind Harrods" by David Morley which starred David Jason, Anton Lesser, Stephanie Cole, and Sophie Roberts. When three former Special Operations Executive agents are reunited in 1997 their meeting forces them to look at their own conduct during World War Two. The story was inspired by real events. Anton Lesser played code maker Leo Marks and Stephanie Cole played Vera Atkins.

== Filmography ==
Year	Title	Role	Notes
1980	To Serve Them All My Days	Blades	Episode: "Part Four"
1982	Love Is Old, Love Is New	Steven	3 episodes
1985	Bleak House	Richard Carstone	6 episodes
1989	Shadow of the Noose	Montague Lush	Episode: "Turn Again"
1989	Murderers Among Us: The Simon Wiesenthal Story	Maertz	Television film
1990	The Green Man	The Visitor	Episode: "Episode #1.3"
1991−1993	The Darling Buds of May	Cedric "Charley" Charlton	18 episodes
1993	It's Your Choice: Selection Skills for Managers	Interviewee #2	Video
1993	The Buddha of Suburbia	Unknown	2 episodes
1994	Absolutely Fabulous	Poet	Episode: "Birth"
1994	Martin Chuzzlewit	Tom Pinch	6 episodes
1994	Shakespeare: The Animated Tales	Cassio (voice)	Episode: "Othello"
1995	Wales Playhouse	Calvin	Episode: "Moniker"
1995	Pie in the Sky	Giles Dutton	Episode: "Lemon Twist"
1996	Testament: The Bible in Animation	Daniel (voice)	Episode: "Daniel"
1998	The Life of Confucius	Confucius	TV series
1998−2002	Heartbeat	Sgt. Raymond Craddock	80 episodes
2003	Midsomer Murders	Quentin Roka	Episode: "A Talent for Life"
2003	Strange	Reverend Capstick	Episode: "Dubik"
2003−2004	My Dad's the Prime Minister	Mr. Potter / Mr. Wight	2 episodes
2005	Casualty	Bob Docker	Episode: "Sticks and Stones"
2006	Foyle's War	Captain George Halliday	Episode: "Bad Blood"
2014	Job's Dinner	Bill	Short film
2017	Phantom Thread	Peter Martin	
2020	Apollo 13: The Dark Side of the Moon	Present Day Lovell	
