= Silent Witness =

British crime drama television series

- Title card (2015–2017)
- Genre: Crime drama
- Created by: Nigel McCrery
- Starring: Current: Emilia Fox; David Caves; Maggie Steed; Francesca Mills
- Theme music composer: Geoffrey Burgon (s. 1); John Harle (s. 2–20); Andy Price (s. 21–present)
- Composers: Geoffrey Burgon (s. 1); John Harle (s. 2–7); Paul Leonard-Morgan (s. 8); Sheridan Tongue (s. 9–20); Jon Opstad (s. 16); Andy Price (s. 21–23); Nick Holywell-Walker (s. 24–25)
- Country of origin: United Kingdom
- Original language: English
- No. of series: 29
- No. of episodes: 267 (list of episodes)

Production
- Executive producers: Caroline Oulton (s. 1–3); Patrick Spence (s. 4); Mike Dormer (s. 5); Jessica Pope (s. 6–9); Laura Mackie (s. 6–9); Hilary Salmon (s. 10–11, 19); Phillippa Giles (s. 12–18); Anne Pivcevic (s. 19–20); Richard Stokes (s. 21–23); Lawrence Till (s. 24–25); Priscilla Parish (s. 24–27); Caroline Levy (s. 24–25); Emilia Fox (s. 24–29); Jo McClellan (s. 24-25); Nawfal Faizullah (s. 25-29); Ed Whitmore (s. 25); Suzi McIntosh (s. 26–29); Timothy Prager (s. 29)
- Producers: Tony Dennis (s. 1); Alison Lumb (s. 2); Anne Pivcevic (s. 3); Lars Macfarlane (s. 4); Diana Kyle (s. 5); Nick Pitt (s. 6–8); Tim Bradley (s. 9–10); George Ormond (s. 11–12); Ruth Kenley-Letts (s. 13); Richard Burrell (s. 14–ep. 15.2); Mat Chaplin (ep. 15.3); Lachlan Mackinnon (ep. 15.4–15.6); Sharon Bloom (s. 16–18); Madonna Baptiste (s. 19); Ceri Meyrick (s. 20)
- Running time: 50 minutes (s. 1–5); 60 minutes (s. 6–present)
- Production company: BBC Studios Drama Productions

Original release
- Network: BBC One
- Release: 21 February 1996 – present

Silent Witness is a British crime drama television series produced by the BBC that focuses on a team of forensic pathology experts and their investigations into various crimes. The series was created by Nigel McCrery, a former murder squad detective based in Nottingham. Since its initial release on 21 February 1996, 29 series have been broadcast.

Amanda Burton starred as primary character Professor Sam Ryan before leaving the show during the eighth series. Since her departure, the series has featured an ensemble cast, which initially consisted of William Gaminara, Tom Ward and Emilia Fox and later on David Caves, Liz Carr and Richard Lintern alongside Emilia Fox. At the end of series 23, Carr and Lintern departed.

The programme is broadcast in more than 235 territories, including ABC in Australia, Showcase and the Knowledge Network in Canada, KRO in the Netherlands, TV One and Prime in New Zealand, BBC First in South Africa and BBC America in the United States.

On 21 July 2026, the BBC announced that it was putting the programme's production out to competitive tender, with the corporation continuing to show the drama as well as retain all rights.

== Series overview ==
The main character in the original series was based on Professor Helen Whitwell, a forensic pathologist based in Sheffield, whom McCrery had known while serving as a police officer. The programme followed the activities of pathologist Sam Ryan, played by Amanda Burton, until she departed early in the eighth series.

There was a succession of regular supporting characters, changing almost every series, but Dr Leo Dalton (William Gaminara) and Dr Harry Cunningham (Tom Ward), who were introduced in the sixth series, continued as lead characters following Ryan's departure, with Dalton replacing her as professor.

A new character, Dr Nikki Alexander (Emilia Fox), was introduced in mid-series eight, a forensic scientist based in Sheffield. While working as a forensic anthropologist, she appropriates facilities and software in the pathology department to analyse an Iron Age find, with the belated, bemused and begrudging approval of Dalton. Dr Alexander is able to assist in a set of cases being investigated by the team, because it transpires that she has "worked in forensic pathology in Johannesburg for six months" and is certified by the Home Office to practise. She eventually overcomes Leo's reluctance and, with Harry's support, is offered and accepts a position on the team.

Before the 16th series begins, Harry has left to accept a position in New York City. He is succeeded by forensics expert Jack Hodgson (David Caves) and his assistant Clarissa Mullery (Liz Carr). At the climax of the 16th series, Leo is killed in an explosion. His replacement, Dr Thomas Chamberlain (Richard Lintern), is introduced at the start of the 17th series.

Although the show focuses heavily on areas of pathology, the police also have a presence in each case. During later series of the show, detectives and investigators tend to differ from episode to episode, with guest artists appearing in these roles. However, during the early years of the show several characters appeared regularly to investigate each case.

=== Location ===
The first three series are set in Cambridge. The setting changed to London from the start of Series 4. From Series 6, the setting moved to the Lyell Centre, the Pathology Department of UCL. The programme remained in an academic setting until the end of Series 16 when the Lyell appeared to have become separated from the university and operated as a stand-alone institution. In 2023 it was announced that production for Silent Witness would be moving to Birmingham. This was reflected in the show at the end of Series 28, with Nikki accepting an offer to set up a new forensic centre in the city along with her team. From Series 29, the show was set at the Sir William Bowman Centre of Excellence in Birmingham.

=== Format ===
Each series is typically made up of a series of two-part stories. The first nine series generally featured eight episodes (four two-part stories), except that series 4 and 5 each featured just six episodes (three two-part stories); this was increased to ten episodes (five two-part stories) from the tenth series onwards, except series 12 and 15 which each featured 12 episodes (six two-part stories). The 25th series, broadcast in 2022, introduced a new format consisting of one story in six episodes, but the format reverted to five two-part stories from the 26th series onwards.

=== International recognition ===
In 1998, the writer John Milne received an Edgar Award from the Mystery Writers of America for the second series episode "Blood, Sweat and Tears". In the United States the series airs during 'Mystery Monday' on BBC America.

== Music ==
The theme music from series 2 onwards is entitled Silencium and is performed by John Harle. The arrangement, for chamber orchestra and soprano saxophone solo, was first performed publicly as part of the Canterbury Festival on 22 October 2011. The vocal section is performed by Sarah Leonard.

== Critical review ==
An episode first broadcast in April 2012 attracted criticism for its violent and sadistic content. There were 632 complaints made about the fifteenth-series episode Redhill, written by Ed Whitmore, which included a scene depicting a sadistic sexual and murderous attack. The BBC was censured by the editorial committee of the BBC Trust, which said in its report:

When the prison officer emerged from the toilet holding the bloodied stick with a pool of blood on the toilet floor, viewers were left in no doubt that an act of sexual violence was being carried out. ... The committee concluded that the final scenes in the toilet block were in breach of the guidelines on harm and offence as they exceeded audience expectations for this series as they depicted a sadistic method of inflicting pain, injury and death.

The BBC had responded to the initial criticism of the episode by saying that it took its responsibility to its audience "extremely seriously" and always tried to "strike the right balance between compelling drama without being unnecessarily graphic". It said that "The final scene was not an attempt to gratuitously shock the audience; ... We acknowledge that certain scenes may have been challenging, but we filmed and presented them in such a way as to make sure that although as a viewer the implication was there, it was never actually shown."

== Episodes ==
Series	Episodes	Originally released		Average viewership (in millions)
Series	Episodes	First released	Last released	Average viewership (in millions)
1	8	21 February 1996	3 April 1996	N/A
2	8	14 February 1997	11 April 1997	N/A
3	8	19 March 1998	24 April 1998	N/A
4	5	30 May 1999	16 June 1999	9.27
5	6	11 December 2000	20 March 2001	8.78
6	8	28 September 2002	27 October 2002	7.79
7	8	11 October 2003	2 November 2003	7.79
8	8	5 September 2004	26 September 2004	7.43
9	8	25 July 2005	16 August 2005	6.89
10	10	16 July 2006	14 August 2006	6.87
11	10	28 August 2007	25 September 2007	6.49
12	12	1 October 2008	6 November 2008	6.32
13	10	7 January 2010	5 February 2010	7.46
14	10	3 January 2011	1 February 2011	7.97
15	12	1 April 2012	20 August 2012	6.59
16	10	10 January 2013	8 February 2013	7.24
17	10	2 January 2014	31 January 2014	7.38
18	10	6 January 2015	3 February 2015	8.82
19	10	4 January 2016	2 February 2016	9.09
20	10	2 January 2017	31 January 2017	8.92
21	10	8 January 2018	7 February 2018	8.75
22	10	8 January 2019	5 February 2019	8.61
23	10	7 January 2020	4 February 2020	8.47
24	10	6 September 2021	5 October 2021	7.28
25	6	23 May 2022	7 June 2022	6.33
26	10	2 January 2023	31 January 2023	6.36
27	10	8 January 2024	13 February 2024	6.30
28	10	6 January 2025	4 February 2025	5.85
29	10	2 February 2026	3 March 2026	5.13

== Characters ==
=== Overview ===
Actor	Character	Series																												
Actor	Character	1	2	3	4	5	6	7	8	9	10	11	12	13	14	15	16	17	18	19	20	21	22	23	24	25	26	27	28	29
Amanda Burton	Sam Ryan	Main	Main	Main	Main	Main	Main	Main	Main																	M				
John McGlynn	Tom Adams	M																												
Clare Higgins	Helen Farmer	M																												
William Armstrong	Trevor Stewart	R	M	M																										
Ruth McCabe	Wyn Ryan	R	M	G																										
Mick Ford	Peter Ross		M																											
Nick Reding	Michael Connor			Main	Main																									
Mark Letheren	Rob Bradley			M																										
William Gaminara	Leo Dalton						Main	Main	Main	Main	Main	Main	Main	Main	Main	Main	Main				G									
Tom Ward	Harry Cunningham						Main	Main	Main	Main	Main	Main	Main	Main	Main	Main														
Emilia Fox	Nikki Alexander								Main	Main	Main	Main	Main	Main	Main	Main	Main	Main	Main	Main	Main	Main	Main	Main	Main	Main	Main	Main	Main	Main
David Caves	Jack Hodgson																Main	Main	Main	Main	Main	Main	Main	Main	Main	Main	Main	Main	Main	Main
Liz Carr	Clarissa Mullery																R	Main	Main	Main	Main	Main	Main	Main						
Richard Lintern	Thomas Chamberlain																	Main	Main	Main	Main	Main	Main	Main						
Jason Wong	Adam Yuen																								M					
Genesis Lynea	Simone Tyler																								Main	Main				
Alastair Michael	Velvy Schur																										Main	Main		
Aki Omoshaybi	Gabriel Folukoya																										Main	Main		
Rhiannon May	Cara Connelly																								Guest	Guest	Main	Main		
Maggie Steed	Harriet Maven																												Main	Main
Francesca Mills	Kit Brooks																												Main	Main

=== Main ===
- Sam Ryan (Amanda Burton) – series 1–8, 25. Sam originally lived and worked in Cambridge, but moved to London at the end of series three after she was offered the job of professor at a university. Sam departed and returned home to Northern Ireland in the second episode of series eight, "A Time To Heal", in which a member of her family became a suspect in a murder case. At the end of Series 24, in a brief mid-credits scene, she is shown phoning Nikki Alexander to ask for help. This leads into her reappearing in Series 25.
- Leo Dalton (William Gaminara) – series 6–16. Leo first appeared in the episode "The Fall Out", where he was a doctor. However, he was promoted to professor after former professor Sam Ryan left. In the episode "Ghosts", both his wife, Theresa, and his daughter, Cassie, are killed in a car accident. He began a relationship with fellow professor Janet Mander in "Death's Door", but ended their relationship in the episode "Redhill". Leo often took a strong opinion on cases and became emotionally involved. He died in the series 16 finale "Greater Love", when he sacrificed himself to save many others from a terrorist bomb explosion. He briefly appeared in a flashback in the last episode of series 20.
- Harry Cunningham (Tom Ward) – series 6–15. Harry started out life as a junior doctor, who worked as an apprentice to Sam and Leo. However, he soon qualified as a pathologist, and has worked on equal footing with the team for a number of years. Harry was single, and lived alone, but has had several romantic relationships, including an ongoing 'will they-won't they' relationship with his colleague Nikki. Harry left the team to accept a professorship in New York at the end of series 15. As this was decided after filming was completed, and the stories were reordered, with "And Then I Fell in Love" airing last, where it was originally scheduled as the second episode, his departure was never on screen.
- Nikki Alexander (Emilia Fox) – since series 8. Originally appearing in the episode "Nowhere Fast", Nikki was originally assigned to the Lyell Centre to defuse the tension between Harry and Leo after Sam's departure. However, Nikki soon became a permanent fixture within the team, and although she features more prominently in the series, holds a lower rank in pathology than Leo. Despite her native home being South Africa, Nikki regards the United Kingdom as her second home, as the reason for her departure from the country lies solely in the hands of her father, Victor, as explained in the episode "Double Dare". Nikki often flirted with colleague Harry, and even invited him to stay at her house after his flat blew up in an explosion. Nikki and Harry were in an ongoing 'will they-won't they' relationship until he left in series 15. As well as this, she developed a close relationship with Leo and looked up to him as a father figure. As Leo and Harry gradually left, Nikki has since become the series' central character. She starts a relationship with Jack in series 25. They marry in series 28.
- Jack Hodgson (David Caves) – since series 16. Before his arrival at the Lyell Centre, Jack was a forensic scientist for the police, working on regular murder investigations. However, when he is called out to the scene of a man's suspicious death in "Change", both Nikki and Leo spot his potential, and looking for a senior colleague to replace Harry, decide to offer Jack a job as the centre's forensic expert. Jack is close friends with colleague Clarissa Mullery, whom he invites to work with him at the Lyell Centre, much to Leo's surprise. In his spare time, Jack is a cage fighter, and splits his home life between forensic research and training for his next fight. From series 25 he has a relationship with Nikki. They marry in series 28.
- Clarissa Mullery (Liz Carr) – series 16–23. Clarissa is Jack's personal lab assistant, who first appears in the episode "Change", when Jack invites her to work at the Lyell Centre with him, much to Leo's surprise. She is disabled by an unspecified condition and uses an electric wheelchair. She has a very cheeky side, making a quip at Leo after he fails to recognise her when she first arrives. Clarissa had clearly worked for Jack for a long period of time before his appointment at the Lyell Centre, but the exact period of time is unknown.
- Thomas Chamberlain (Richard Lintern) – series 17–23. Thomas Chamberlain took over as head of the Lyell Centre from Leo who died at the end of series 16. He was an experienced forensic pathologist with a renowned reputation in toxicology and is described as charming, charismatic and socially shrewd. His first encounters with Jack, Nikki and Clarissa did not go well, but they gradually warmed to him. It is revealed in the last episode of his first series that his wife left him just before he started working at the Lyell Centre, taking their daughter with her. He died in the series 23 finale "The Greater Good" while investigating a nerve agent in the pathology suite of the Lyell Centre.
- Simone Tyler (Genesis Lynea) – series 24–25. Simone is a meticulous forensic ecologist, who makes the jump from the museum to the mortuary at the Lyell Centre. Simone leaves at the end of series 25 to look after her nieces in Trinidad after learning about her estranged sister's death.
- Cara Connelly (Rhiannon May) – series 24–27. Jack's niece, who works at the Lyell Centre part-time as an intern while studying. Born deaf, Cara also had to deal with her dad Ryan's time in jail and on-off relationship with her mother. Jack was, however, a consistent supportive presence for her. She appears as a guest before joining the Lyell in Series 26, later departing when returning to full time study.
- Velvy Schur (Alastair Michael) – series 26–27. Velvy is an assistant anatomical pathology technologist. He grew up in a secluded, very conservative Jewish community and was ostracised by his family when he chose to leave, leading him to experience significant personal issues. He later leaves the Lyell to study for a masters degree in Forensic Science.
- Gabriel Folukoya (Aki Omoshaybi) – series 26–27. Gabriel is an academic neurologist and pathologist who spent much of his career in data analysis. He takes over the position of Head of the Lyell Centre, left vacant following Thomas Chamberlain's death and filled de facto by Nikki. Gabriel later departs to focus full-time on his other position as Dean of Criminology at a university.
- Harriet Maven (Maggie Steed) – since series 28. Harriet is a legendary pathologist and Professor who takes over as the final Head of the Lyell Centre following Gabriel's departure. Widowed but refusing to let it get her down, Harriet is a wise and esteemed counsel for her staff. When the team moved to Birmingham at the end of Series 28, Harriet transitioned to become the new Head of the Bowman Centre.
- Kit Brooks (Francesca Mills) – since series 28. Kit is an enthusiastic and quick-witted crime analyst who was inspired to enter the field by Clarissa Mullery. A technology expert, Kit is also empathetic with people, and establishes a particular back and forth with Jack. She also moves to Birmingham with the team at the end of Series 28 to join the new Bowman Centre.

=== Recurring ===
- Detective Chief Inspector Tom Adams (John McGlynn) – series 1. An investigator with the Cambridgeshire police force, who had an affair with Kerry Cox, before her death.
- Superintendent Helen Farmer (Clare Higgins) – series 1. A superintendent, and Tom Adams' boss and mentor, who accompanied him on investigating several cases during his time in the force.
- Ricky Ryan (Matthew Steer) – series 1. Wyn's son and Sam's nephew, who regularly got into trouble and was expelled from school for very poor behaviour.
- Trevor Stewart (William Armstrong) – series 1–3. As well as being a pathologist in his own right, Trevor was Sam's business partner, owning half of the morgue and its facilities. Trevor decided to stay in Cambridge with his friends and family when Sam accepted the professorship position at a university in London and moved away at the end of series three.
- Wyn Ryan (Ruth McCabe) – series 1–3. Professor Ryan's sister who moved to Cambridge with her mother some years before Sam's arrival, and one of the reasons Sam Ryan relocated. Initially their relationship was strained, but eventually the two moved in with one another and grew close. In the first episode of series 3, it is announced Wyn returned to Ireland. Wyn makes one appearance in series three to visit Sam and announce her upcoming wedding.
- Superintendent Peter Ross (Mick Ford) – series 2. A superintendent, and an ex-boyfriend of Sam's, who believed in a strong relationship between the police and the pathology lab.
- Detective Chief Inspector Michael Connor (Nick Reding) – Series 3–4. A detective chief inspector, and old friend of Sam's, whom she met during her junior years at university. He makes one appearance for the third story of the fourth series.
- Detective Sergeant Rob Bradley (Mark Letheren) – series 3. A detective sergeant, who as Connor's junior officer, accompanied him with the investigating in the cases which he was assigned to.
- Fred Dale (Sam Parks) – series 1–3. Fred was Sam's main assistant during post mortems and on visits to crime scenes, often identifying DNA samples at the scene of the crime, and linking them to those responsible. He was also notable for not having many speaking lines, and regularly appearing without speaking. His fate at the end of series 3 was not revealed.
- Detective Constable Kerry Cox (Ruth Gemmell) – series 1. A junior trainee detective who had an affair with Tom Adams, but was later killed in a freak accident in a hospital basement.
- Detective Constable Marcia Evans (Janice Acquah) – series 1. A fellow junior trainee detective for the Cambridgeshire police force, who resigned after Kerry Cox's death.
- Detective Chief Inspector Rachel Selway (Nicola Redmond) – Series 2. Tom Adams' replacement, following his resignation from the force. She joined the team alongside junior sergeant Tony Speed.
- Detective Sergeant Tony Speed (Richard Huw) – series 2. A junior sergeant, who joined the team alongside his superior officer, Rachel Selway. He knew Peter Ross from a previous posting.
- Janet Mander (Jaye Griffiths) – series 12–15. Janet is a psychological profiler who assists the police in cases of serial offences. She began a relationship with Leo in the episode "Death's Door", and they lived together as partners until Leo ended the relationship in "Redhill". She recurringly worked alongside the team to provide them with information in order to get an idea of the suspect they are looking for. Janet decided to move away from London after Leo ended their relationship.
- Charlie Gibbs (Wunmi Mosaku) – series 13. A junior doctor and lab technician, who was appointed to work with the team by Professor Dalton.
- Zak Khan (Arsher Ali) – series 14. A junior doctor who worked his forensic science apprenticeship with the team, to learn the ropes of the profession.
- Rosemary Mason (Jane Hazlegrove) – series 6–7. The main receptionist at the Lyell Centre, before the change in focus from university department to purely commercial pathology.
- Max Thorndyke (Daniel Weyman) – series 20–22. Max is Clarissa's husband, a forensic data analyst originally called in by the Lyell team to help solve a case in series 20 but returning in two further episodes in series 21.
- Matt Garcia (Michael Landes) – series 21–23. Matt is the US Chief of Mission in the UK. He begins a relationship with Nikki during the series 21 episode "A Special Relationship" which they maintain despite the difficulties of a long-distance relationship and Matt's political aspirations. The two go their separate ways in the series 23 episode "Deadhead".
- Adam Yuen (Jason Wong) – series 24. Adam is a confident, bright and keen pathologist who joins Nikki and Jack at the Lyell Centre. He dies midway through series 24, after being hit by a car, while investigating a suspect.

=== Guest appearances ===
Silent Witness features a number of future established actors in guest appearances, including Emily Mortimer, Idris Elba, Nicholas Hoult, Benedict Cumberbatch, Susie Porter, Jodie Comer, Nikki Amuka-Bird, Daisy Ridley, Daniel Kaluuya, Jim Carter, Martin Compston, Eddie Marsan, Tamsin Egerton, Jason Watkins, Evanna Lynch, John Hannah, and Sean Pertwee.

== Home media ==
=== Australia ===
In Australia (Region 4), series 1 through 23 have been released on DVD through Roadshow Entertainment, starting with series 1 on 7 September 2006 through to series 21 on 28 May 2018. Universal then took over the releases beginning with series 22 on 20 November 2019, and have re-released some earlier series this time as individual series rather than 2 series editions.

Australia (Region 4)
DVD title	Release date
Series One	7 September 2006
Series Two	5 September 2007
Series Three & Four	6 May 2010
Series Five & Six	2 September 2010
Series Seven & Eight	5 May 2011
Series Nine & Ten	4 August 2011
Series Eleven & Twelve	1 December 2011
Series Thirteen & Fourteen	7 June 2012
Series Fifteen & Sixteen	5 June 2013
Series Seventeen & Eighteen	6 May 2015
Series Nineteen & Twenty	3 May 2017
Series Twenty One	28 May 2018 11 December 2019 (Universal)
Series Twenty Two	20 November 2019 (Universal)
Series Nineteen	11 December 2019 (Universal)
Series Twenty	11 December 2019 (Universal)
Series Twenty Three	8 April 2020 (Universal)
Series Eighteen	6 May 2020 (Universal)
Series Fifteen	28 October 2020 (Universal)
Series Sixteen	28 October 2020 (Universal)

=== United Kingdom ===
As of March 2026, all 29 series have been released on DVD. In addition, all episodes (barring two from series 1) from the series have been made available on the BBC iPlayer.

== Novels ==
During the early years of the show, series creator McCrery wrote and published four tie-in novels relating to the series, following Sam Ryan (Amanda Burton), Trevor Stewart (William Armstrong) and Superintendent Tom Adams (John McGlynn), and brand new character DS Stanley Sharman, with Burton generally appearing on the front cover of each novel. A fifth novel, "In Search of Evil", was due to be released in 2003, but its publication was cancelled.

No.	Title	Author	Date
1	A Case for the Defence	Nigel McCrery	9 September 1996
Walking home from a night out, Sam stumbles upon the remains of a mutilated body on a footpath in the Northwick graveyard. Evidence suggests that the killing may be linked to a particularly ritualistic form of the black arts, but Sam is unconvinced as the murder bears an uncanny resemblance to another murder committed in the same town many years ago. When a second body is discovered, Sam's evidence is called into question, and is used to create the information that the police need to solve the case, before the killer strikes again. As Sam and Trevor uncover information surrounding the circumstances of the murders, elements that once seemed like coincidences soon appear to belong to a more horrific plan.
2	Strange Screams of Death	Nigel McCrery	3 August 1998
Sam is tasked with investigating the circumstances surrounding the death of a woman whose body is discovered in a disused shed at a former American airbase on the outskirts of Cambridge. The post mortem reveals that she had been violently raped, before being tortured, and viciously murdered. When a second body is discovered in similar circumstances, Sam finds herself dealing with a serial killer, who has the hunger to slaughter again. Can her profile of information find the identity of the killer before it is too late? Meanwhile, as Tom Adams closes in on his prime suspect, Sam discovers that he may not be working alone, and a search is launched to find the accomplice of a dangerous criminal.
3	The Spider's Web	Nigel McCrery	2 August 1999
Sam is asked to perform a second autopsy on a teenage boy who was killed in a tragic joyriding accident, when despite his parents' protests, the results of the autopsy seem clear—he died of multiple injuries consistent with a high-speed car crash. However, as Trevor performed the post mortem, Sam is reluctant to go up against her friend and colleague, in an attempt to find the answers that the family are looking for. Reading Trevor's post mortem report prompts Sam to go ahead with the second autopsy, and her findings seem to suggest that the accident may have been no such thing. Neither Trevor nor Superintendent Tom Adams accept her findings, and believe that she is reading between the lines.
4	Faceless Strangers	Nigel McCrery	3 September 2001
When the wife and beau of a local member of parliament is found dead in her own home, Superintendent Tom Adams calls upon Sam and the entire resources of the Cambridge Constabulary, in an attempt to further his career, and solve the case as quickly as possible. However, his investigation is halted by the discovery of the decomposed body of a homeless drug addict in the local underground toilet block. When Adams dismisses the death as an open and shut case, one of his juniors, DS Stanley Sharman, decides to enlist Sam's help, to discover the identity of the dead woman—and discover just who is responsible for her death. Meanwhile, Adams is determined to crack his case.
