= The Man Who Married Himself =

2010 British short film by Garrick Hamm

- Directed by: Garrick Hamm
- Written by: Charlie Fish and Garrick Hamm
- Produced by: Tessa Mitchell
- Starring: Richard E. Grant; Emilia Fox; Celia Imrie; Warren Clarke
- Cinematography: Michael Seresin
- Edited by: James Kempt
- Music by: Steve Hamilton
- Production company: Ribeye Films
- Release date: 2010
- Running time: 13 minutes
- Country: United Kingdom
- Language: English

The Man Who Married Himself is a 2010 British short comedy film directed by Garrick Hamm and written by Charlie Fish and Hamm. It stars Richard E. Grant, Emilia Fox, Celia Imrie, and Warren Clarke. The film is an adaptation of Fish's short story of the same name, first published in 1999 at Fiction on the Web.

== Premise ==
A man decides to marry himself, and learns some truths about life and love on the way.

== Cast ==
- Richard E. Grant as Oliver Parker
- Emilia Fox as Sarah
- Warren Clarke as Bishop Zatarga
- Celia Imrie as mother
- Malcolm Rogers as father

== Accolades ==
Year	Award	Category	Recipient(s)	Result	Ref.
2010	LA Shorts Fest	Best Comedy	Garrick Hamm	Won	
2010	Rhode Island International Film Festival	Best Comedy Short	Garrick Hamm	Won	
