= Joan Washington =

British dialect coach (1946–2021)

- Born: Joan Geddie; December 21, 1946; Aberdeen, Scotland
- Died: September 2, 2021 (aged 74); Avening, England
- Education: Royal Central School of Speech and Drama
- Occupation: Dialect coach
- Spouse(s): Keith Washington (m. 1969, divorced) Richard E. Grant (m. 1986)

Joan Washington (née Geddie; 21 December 1946 – 2 September 2021) was a British dialect coach who trained many high-profile actors across film, television, and theatre.

== Personal life ==
Joan Geddie was born in Aberdeen, Scotland, on 21 December 1946, to John Geddie and Maggie Cook, a doctor and nurse respectively. At 18, she moved to London, where she attended the Central School of Speech and Drama. On graduation, she taught speech, initially at a reform school for girls and subsequently at the Royal College of Nursing.

Geddie married Keith Washington in 1969, with whom she had a son, Tom. They later divorced. She married actor Richard E. Grant, whom she met while working at London's Actors Centre, in 1986. The couple had a daughter, Olivia Grant.

Diagnosed with lung cancer in 2020, Joan Washington died at home in Avening, Gloucestershire, on 2 September 2021, aged 74. At the time of her death, she and Grant had been together for 38 years. In 2023, Grant published a memoir titled A Pocketful of Happiness, based on his diaries and named after the instruction to find a "pocketful of happiness in each day", which Washington had given him during her illness. He described her attitude following diagnosis eight months before her death as "accepting, clear sighted, sanguine and totally without self pity".

== Career ==
Washington was an acclaimed dialect coach, who worked with actors including Penélope Cruz, Thandiwe Newton, and Jessica Chastain. Over the course of her career, she worked on over 100 films and television series, in addition to more than 80 National Theatre productions. Her first film was Barbra Streisand’s Yentl (1983), for which she taught cast members to sound like Ashkenazi Jews in early 20th-century Poland.

In 1986, reviewing a double bill of David Mamet's Prairie du Chien and The Shawl at the Royal Court Theatre, Martin Cropper wrote that "the whole evening shows once again the skill of the dialect coach Joan Washington." In 1992, Frances Barber told The Times that she could not have managed her varied roles at the National Theatre without the training of Washington, then the theatre's accent coach.

Washington's skill in coaching came as a result of thorough research, and early experience. While teaching standard English pronunciation at the Royal College of Nursing (where students came from across Britain and the Commonwealth), she made recordings of their accents. These later formed the basis of a library of reference tapes accumulated by Washington. To ensure the accuracy of accents from past decades, she conducted recorded interviews with older Britons, as well as making use of historic recordings — such as those made of British prisoners by Germans during World War I.

== Selected filmography ==
- Yentl (1983)
- 101 Dalmatians (1996)
- 102 Dalmatians (2000)
- The Life Aquatic with Steve Zissou (2004)
- Notes on a Scandal (2006)
- Into the Storm (2009)
- Green Zone (2010)
- Cinderella (2015)
- Safe House (2012)
- The Hustle (2019)
- The Witches (2020)
