= Brian Jones (intelligence analyst) =

Brian Francis Gill Jones (24 August 1944 – 10 February 2012) was a UK metallurgist who worked as an intelligence analyst, was skeptical of claims of Iraqi WMD and gave evidence concerning the justification for the Iraq war.

== Intelligence career ==
Jones was a metallurgist by training who worked for many years in the technical branches of the UK Ministry of Defence. He specialised initially in the effects of radiation on the integrity of metals, particularly in the construction of nuclear reactor pressure vessels. From 1987 until his retirement in 2003, he worked in the technical branch of the Defence Intelligence Staff, specialising in counter-proliferation of weapons of mass destruction. He was credited for being sceptical of the WMD claims regarding Iraq.

=== Evidence ===
Having spent most of his career in the deliberately low-profile world of nuclear energy and then in intelligence work, he came to public notice in the summer of 2003 when, shortly after his retirement from the MoD, he gave evidence to the Hutton Inquiry, which was set up following the death of Dr David Kelly to investigate allegations that the so-called "dodgy dossier" of material was published by the government of Tony Blair in order to justify the 2003 invasion of Iraq. In his report, Lord Hutton reported that Jones' concerns over the '45 minute' claims had not been considered by either the then Chief of Defence Intelligence, Air Marshal Sir Joe French or the Joint Intelligence Committee.

Following his retirement and appearance before the Hutton enquiry, Jones went on to give evidence to both the Butler Review and the Chilcot Inquiry to give evidence on the intelligence available to Ministers before the 2003 Invasion of Iraq. He also wrote a book entitled "Failing Intelligence", which was accepted by Sir John Chilcot as his evidence to that enquiry.

== Post-retirement ==
Following his retirement, Jones returned to academia, becoming a Visiting Senior Research Fellow at the Mountbatten Centre for International Studies at Southampton University; he also lectured at the Royal United Services Institute in London.

Jones died on 10 February 2012 following a short illness.

Jones became the subject of a BBC Radio 4 drama in March 2013. He was played by Richard E Grant in "The Iraq Dossier" by David Morley.
