= Julia Langdon =

British journalist and writer (born 1946)

Julia Mary Langdon (born July 1946) is a British journalist and writer.

A political journalist since 1971, she became a lobby correspondent in 1974. Leaving The Guardian in 1984, she was appointed political editor of the Daily Mirror, becoming the first woman to hold the position on a national newspaper in the UK. Later, Langdon was political editor of The Sunday Telegraph. Having children, however, was one of the reasons she left the parliamentary lobby in the 1990s.

Langdon has been a freelance writer since 1992, and has written a biography of the Labour politician Mo Mowlam (2000). She is writing a biography of former Prime Minister Gordon Brown. She wrote the chapter on the 1973 Lincoln by-election for British By-Elections 1769–2025 (2025), edited by Iain Dale. She has also worked as a broadcaster for the BBC. She presented a programme on BBC Radio 4 about the recruitment of female spies, which featured an interview with Eliza Manningham-Buller, former head of the Security Service. In the programme Langdon revealed that she had been approached at school to work for the secret services.
