= David Caves =

Northern Ireland actor (born 1978)

- Born: 7 August 1978 (age 48); Belfast, Northern Ireland
- Education: Campbell College, Belfast; London Academy of Music and Dramatic Art; University of St Andrews
- Occupation: Actor
- Years active: 2003–present
- Height: 1.89 m (6 ft 2 1/2 in)
- Spouse: Verity Caves (m. 2019)
- Children: 2
- Parent(s): Naomi Caves; Michael Caves

David Caves (born 7 August 1978) is a Northern Irish actor who is best known for his role as Jack Hodgson in the BBC drama series Silent Witness. After graduating from London Academy of Music and Dramatic Art (LAMDA) in 2005, Caves has appeared in a variety of stage productions, including The Beggar’s Opera at Regent’s Park Open Air Theatre and The Changeling at the Southwark Playhouse.

== Early life ==
Caves was educated at Campbell College, Belfast. His parents and his uncle were all teachers. Caves studied modern languages, including French and German, at the University of St Andrews from 1997 to 2002.

He originally planned to become a teacher before training at LAMDA. He worked as a teacher in France as part of his university course but when he returned to the UK he found he had "lost the drive for the academic side of things" and found himself getting heavily involved in plays and musicals at the university. He is quoted as saying:

I found I loved this medium and wanted to look into it more, to see what was out there and what drama school was about. So I did some research and decided to have a go, not really expecting anything to happen. I was naive and did not know how tough it was. I thought I was probably not good enough but something inside me told me I should have a go, so I did.

== Career ==
Caves was offered places at both LAMDA and Bristol Old Vic, and chose the former. His training focused on theatre and, prior to his addition to the Silent Witness cast, he was known as a stage actor, having impressed as Petruchio in the Royal Shakespeare Company's 2012 touring production of The Taming of the Shrew. He has also starred in Ironclad: Battle for Blood.

Other notable roles in theatre include Deflores in The Changeling, Southwark Playhouse; Macheath in The Beggar’s Opera at Regent's Park Open Theatre and Bosola in The Duchess of Malfi, Northampton.

In 2014, Caves also featured in the television documentary The Crime Thriller Club. Presented by Bradley Walsh, this documentary was a mix of interviews, film clips and a game show about the detective genre in both film and literature.

In 2016, Caves portrayed Clint Hill in the film Jackie.

== Personal life ==
Caves was an ambassador for Northern Ireland Hospice. He married Verity Caves (née Cunningham) in 2019.

== Filmography ==
Film
Year	Title	Role	Notes
2014	Paddy	Dad	Short film
2014	Ironclad: Battle for Blood	Berenger	
2016	The Complete Walk: A Midsummer Night's Dream	Theseus	Short film
2016	Jackie	Clint Hill	
2019	Widows Walk	Joe	

Television
Year	Title	Role	Notes
2013–Present	Silent Witness	Jack Hodgson	106 Episodes
2013-2014	Crime Thriller Club	Himself/ Jack Hodgson	S1Ep5 & S2Ep6
2019	15 Days	Michael	
2019	Saturday Kitchen	Himself	Series 15 Episode 42

== Theatre ==
Year	Title	Role	Notes
2003	This is Our Youth	Dennis	The Byre Theatre, St Andrews
2004	Romeo and Juliet	Capulet	LAMDA
2004	The Country Wife	Homer	LAMDA
2004	The Maid's Tragedy	Melantius	LAMDA
2005	Dublin Carol	Mark	LAMDA
2005	The Crucible	Marshall Herrick	LAMDA
2005	Black Hands/ Dead Section	Holger	LAMDA
2005	Three Birds Alighting on A Field	Auctioneer	LAMDA
2005	Twelfth Night	Antonio	Love & Madness Productions
2005	Wuthering Heights	Heathcliff	Love & Madness Productions
2006	O’Flaherty VC	O'Flaherty	Lost Theatre Festival
2006	A Life of the Mind	Jake	Battersea Arts Centre
2006	The Duchess of Malfi	Roderigo	West Yorkshire Playhouse
2007	Cymbeline	Ensemble	Cheek by Jowl
2007	Young Directors and Designers Summer School	Actor	Cheek by Jowl
2007	Carve	Scott Mason	Tristan Bates Theatre
2008	Troilus and Cressida	Hector	Cheek by Jowl
2009	Stones in his Pockets	Charlie	Mark Goucher Ltd, UK Tour
2009	Mad Forest	Doctor/ Anggel, Student	Strike Ensemble
2009	High School Verse Project	Bully	Company Project
2010	Macbeth	Macduff	Cheek by Jowl
2010	Much Ado About Nothing	Borrachio	Chester Performs
2010	Hercules	Hercules	Chester Performs
2010	The Duchess of Malfi	Bosola	Royal & Derngate
2011	Beggar's Opera	Macheath	Regent's Park Open Air Theatre
2011	The Changeling	Deflores	Southwark Playhouse
2011	The Taming of the Shrew	Petruchio	Royal Shakespeare Company
